= Straton of Sardis =

Ancient Greek poet and anthologist

Straton of Sardis (Ancient Greek: Στράτων; better known under his Latin name Strato) was a Greek poet and anthologist from the Lydian city of Sardis.

== Life ==
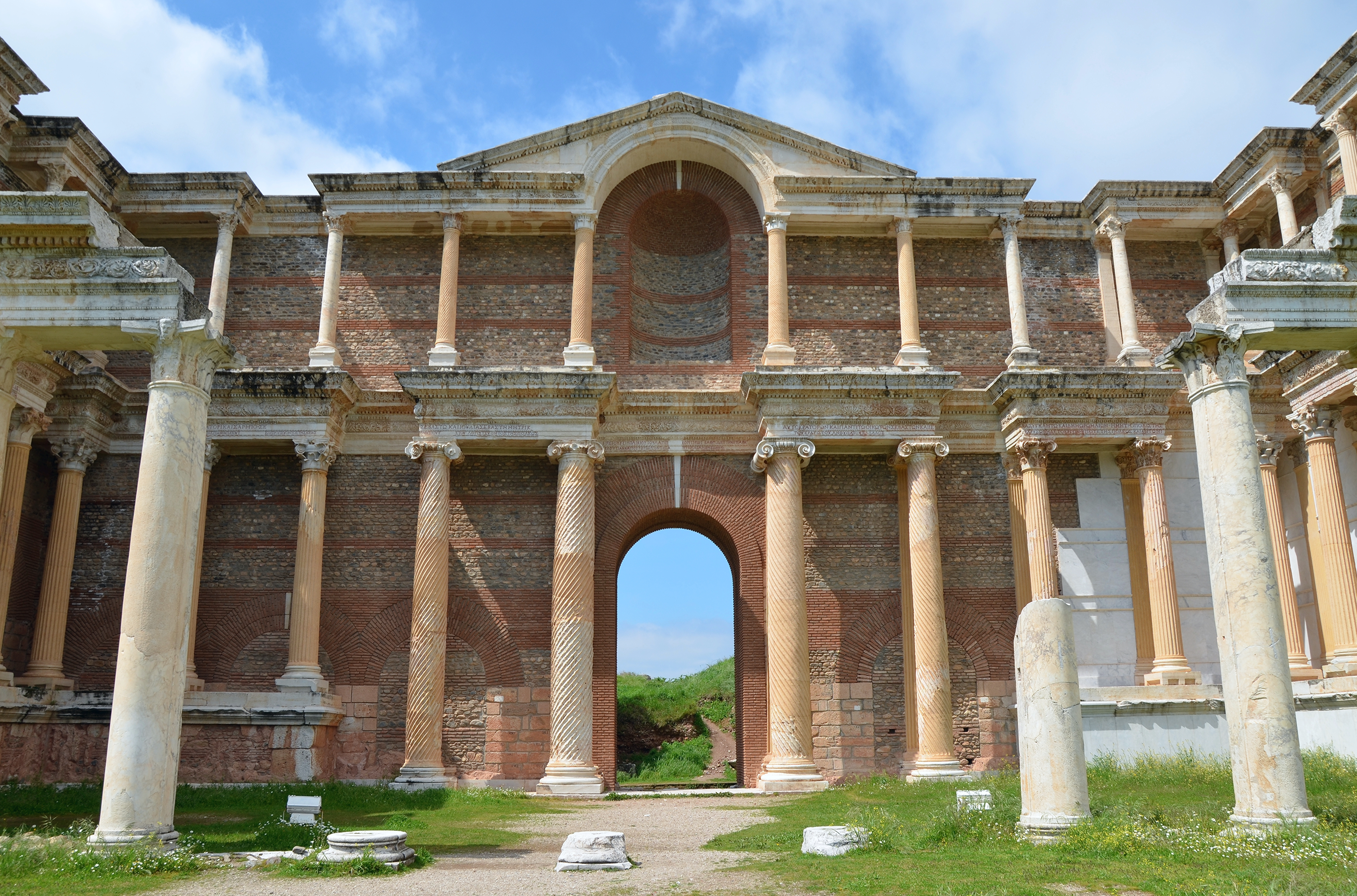
Remains of the bath-gymnasium complex in Sardis.

Straton is thought by some scholars to have lived during the time of Hadrian, based on authorship of a poem about the doctor Artemidorus Capito, a contemporary of Hadrian, being ascribed to him. Not all accept this identification; in the 1980s, a first-century date was proposed for Straton and, more recently, a Neronian or Flavian period has been suggested. Diogenes Laërtius, at the beginning of the 3rd century AD, mentions an epigrammatist by the name of Straton, who some believe was Straton of Sardis.

== Works ==
Straton assembled the anthology of erotic and amorous epigrams called Μοῦσα Παιδική (Mousa Paidikē, "The Boyish Muse" or Musa Puerilis).

=== Transmission ===
Around 900 AD, a Byzantine scholar named Constantine Cephalas compiled pieces of several Greek anthologies, including The Boyish Muse, to make a comprehensive collection of Greek epigrams. Since there is no other textual proof, we do not know if The Boyish Muse was taken whole, or if a selection was made from it, or if Cephalas maintained the order of the original anthology, or how much of it is original.

Cephalas's collection was revised, divided into specialized anthologies, adapted for school use, and generally much copied. In 1301 AD, a scholar named Maximus Planudes put together a bowdlerized version of the Cephalan book, which became very popular in the Greek-speaking world. When the Ottomans conquered the remains of the Byzantine Empire, many Greek scholars brought versions of Planudes's version with them into exile in Italy. The Greeks became teachers to Italian scholars. In 1494 they printed an edition of the Planudean book, the Florilegium Diversorum Epigrammatum, in Florence.

Most of what is known of Straton's work comes instead from a manuscript copied around 980 AD, which preserved many of the poems from the earlier Cephalan anthology. This manuscript was discovered in the library of the Counts Palatine in Heidelberg in 1606 or 1607, by a young visiting scholar named Claudius Salmasius, now called the Palatine Anthology. There is no clear record of how it got there, but a visiting Italian scholar probably left it. About the middle of the 16th century, the Roman scholar and antiquarian Fulvio Orsini (1529–1600) had seen and mentioned such a manuscript, then in the possession of Angelo Colloti.

The newly discovered poems in the Palatine version were copied out by Salmasius, and he began to circulate clandestine manuscript copies as the Anthologia Inedita. His copy was later published: first in 1776 when Richard François Philippe Brunck included it in his Analecta; and then the full Palatine Anthology was published by F. Jacobs as the Anthologia Graeca (13 vols. 1794–1803; revised 1813–1817). The remains of Straton's The Boyish Muse became Book 12 in Jacob's critical Anthologia Graeca edition.

=== Translations ===
Because of its taboo subject matter, until the mid-20th century Straton's work was generally left untranslated, translated only into Latin, published in censored forms, or translated only in private editions. These translations helped form the Greek core of influential homosexual poetry anthologies, such as Elisar von Kupffer's Lieblingminne und Freundesliebe in der Weltliteratur (1899) and Edward Carpenter's Iolaus (1908). New translations of Straton's 'Book 12' were later published by poets such as Roger Peyrefitte and Salvatore Quasimodo.

Straton's surviving anthology of poems was translated as part of W. R. Paton's translation of the entire Greek Anthology in the Loeb series in 1918, by Dennis Kratz in 1995, and by Daryl Hine. This last translation was published by Princeton University in 2001 as Puerilities, containing 258 surviving poems (omitting one, an obvious later forgery), translated by Daryl Hine, with Greek originals facing. The title is a pun on the one-time title of the work, the Musa Puerilis. Alessandria: Edizioni dell'Orso recently published in 2007 Lucia Floridi's Stratone di Sardi. Epigrammi. Testo critico, traduzione e commento, a book incorporating 105 epigrams into a single edition with commentary.

An article by James Jope in the journal Mouseion (2005) compares the translations by Hine and Peyrefitte and discusses how the poems can be reshaped in a modern context.

Scholars have noted Straton's anthology as a strong influence on the work of 20th-century Greek poet C. P. Cavafy.
