= Rufinus (poet) =

Greek poet of the Roman era (c. 3rd or 4th century AD)

Rufinus (Ancient Greek: Ῥουφῖνος; fl. c. 3rd or 4th century AD) was a Greek epigrammatist of the Roman era.

== Life ==
When Rufinus lived is unknown. He probably postdated the Garland of Philip of Thessalonica, produced under Nero. Alan Cameron estimates that his poems must have existed by the 390s at the latest as he believes he was copied by Ausonius and Claudian. Cameron dates Rufinus to before Strato, which would mean that he was active before 250. Denys Page, conversely, places Strato before Rufinus and is in favour of a fourth century date for the latter. Page is more cautious about the idea that Ausonius and Claudian borrowed from Rufinus. In his dating, he has the support of Barry Baldwin, who notes similar vocabulary between Rufinus and Patristic writers.

Rufinus possibly lived near Ephesus, where one of his poems is set.

== Works ==
Some thirty-eight epigrams are attributed to Rufinus in the fifth book of the Greek Anthology, and another epigram, which is ascribed to an otherwise unknown Rufinus Domesticus in the Anthology of Planudes, may also be by him. His verses are of the same light amatory character as those of Agathias, Paulus Silentiarius, Macedonius, and others.

== Sources ==
- Baldwin, Barry (1980). "Notes on Rufinus". Phoenix. 34 (4): 337–346. doi:10.2307/1087638. JSTOR 1087638
- Cameron, Alan (1982). "Strato and Rufinus". The Classical Quarterly. 32. (1): 162, 166–167, 168. doi:10.1017/S0009838800022953
- Page, Denys, ed. (1978). The Epigrams of Rufinus. Cambridge University Press. pp. 19–27.
- Paton, W. R., trans. (1916).The Greek Anthology I (Loeb Classical Library). London: Heinemann.
- Smith, Philip (1867). "4. Rufinus". Smith, William (ed.). Dictionary of Greek and Roman Biography and Mythology. Vol. 3. Boston: Little, Brown, and Company. p. 668.
