= Greek Anthology =

Ancient collection of short poems

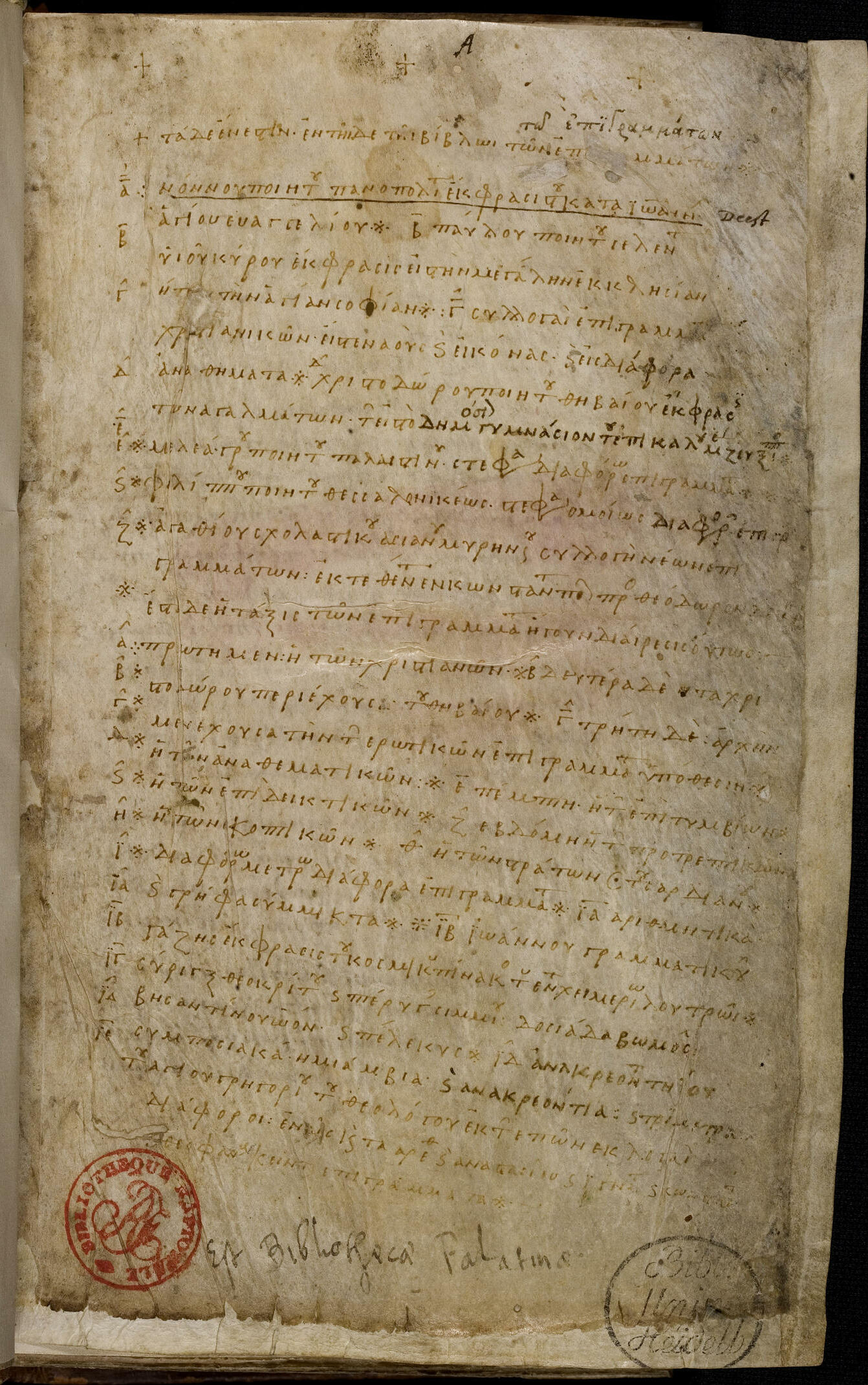
Beginning of the Anthologia Palatina, main part of The Greek Anthology. Scan by the Gesellschaft der Freunde Universität Heidelberg e. V.

The Greek Anthology (Latin: Anthologia Graeca) is a collection of poems, mostly epigrams, that span the Classical and Byzantine periods of Greek literature. Most of the material of the Greek Anthology comes from two manuscripts, the Palatine Anthology of the 10th century and the Anthology of Planudes (or Planudean Anthology) of the 14th century.

The earliest known anthology in Greek was compiled by Meleager of Gadara in the first century BC, under the title Anthologia, or "Flower-gathering". It contained poems by the compiler himself and forty-six other poets, including Archilochus, Alcaeus, Anacreon, and Simonides. In his preface to his collection, Meleager describes his arrangement of poems as if it were a head-band or garland of flowers woven together. This metaphor gave rise to the word "Anthology", meaning a collection of short literary works.

Meleager's Anthology was popular enough that it attracted later additions. Prefaces to the editions of Philippus of Thessalonica and Agathias were preserved in the Greek Anthology to attest to their additions of later poems. The definitive edition was made by Constantine Cephalas in the 10th century, who added a number of other collections: homoerotic verse collected by Straton of Sardis in the 2nd century AD; a collection of Christian epigrams found in churches; a collection of satirical and convivial epigrams collected by Diogenianus; Christodorus' description of statues in the Byzantine gymnasium of Zeuxippos; and a collection of inscriptions from a temple in Cyzicus.

The scholar Maximus Planudes also made an edition of the Greek Anthology, which while adding some poems, primarily deleted or bowdlerized many of the poems he felt were too explicit. His anthology was the only one known to Western Europe (his autograph copy, dated 1301 survives; the first edition based on his collection was printed in 1494) until 1606 when Claudius Salmasius found in the library at Heidelberg a fuller collection based on Cephalas. The copy made by Salmasius was not, however, published until 1776, when Richard François Philippe Brunck included it in his Analecta. The first critical edition was that of F. Jacobs (13 vols. 1794–1803; revised 1813–1817).

Since its transmission to the rest of Europe, the Greek Anthology has left a deep impression on its readers. In a 1971 article on Robin Skelton's translation of a selection of poems from the Anthology, a reviewer for the Times Literary Supplement wrote, "The time of life does not exist when it is impossible to discover in it a masterly poem one had never seen before." Its influence can be seen on writers as diverse as Propertius, Ezra Pound and Edgar Lee Masters. Since full and uncensored English translations became available at the end of the 20th century, its influence has widened still further.

== Literary history ==
The art of occasional poetry had been cultivated in Greece from an early period, being used to commemorate remarkable individuals or events, on funerary monuments and votive offerings. These compositions were termed epigrams, i.e. inscribed poems. Such a composition must necessarily be brief, and as a result, conciseness of expression, pregnancy of meaning, purity of diction and singleness of thought are the indispensable conditions of excellence in the epigrammatic style. The term was soon extended to any piece by which these conditions were fulfilled.

About 60 BC, the sophist and poet Meleager of Gadara undertook to combine the choicest effusions of his predecessors into a single body of fugitive poetry. Collections of monumental inscriptions, or of poems on particular subjects, had previously been formed by Polemon Periegetes and others; but Meleager first gave the principle a comprehensive application. His selection, compiled from forty-six of his predecessors, and including numerous contributions of his own, was entitled The Garland (Στέφανος); in an introductory poem each poet is compared to some flower, fancifully deemed appropriate to his genius. The arrangement of his collection was alphabetical, according to the initial letter of each epigram.

In the age of the emperor Tiberius (or Trajan, according to others) the work of Meleager was continued by another epigrammatist, Philippus of Thessalonica, who first employed the term "anthology". His collection, which included the compositions of thirteen writers subsequent to Meleager, was also arranged alphabetically, and contained an introductory poem. It was of inferior quality to Meleager's. Somewhat later, under Hadrian, another supplement was formed by the sophist Diogenianus of Heracleia (2nd century AD), and Straton of Sardis compiled his elegant Μοῦσα παιδική (Musa Puerilis) from his productions and those of earlier writers. No further collection from various sources is recorded until the time of Justinian, when epigrammatic writing, especially of an amatory character, experienced a great revival at the hands of Agathias of Myrina, the historian, Paulus Silentiarius, and their circle. Their ingenious but mannered productions were collected by Agathias into a new anthology, entitled The Circle (Κύκλος); it was the first to be divided into books, and arranged with reference to the subjects of the pieces.

These and other collections made during the Middle Ages are now lost. The partial incorporation of them into a single body, classified according to the contents in 15 books, was the work of a certain Constantinus Cephalas, whose name alone is preserved in the single MS. of his compilation extant, but who probably lived during the literary revival under Constantine Porphyrogenitus, at the beginning of the 10th century. He appears to have merely made excerpts from the existing anthologies, with the addition of selections from Lucillius, Palladas, and other epigrammatists, whose compositions had been published separately. His arrangement is founded on a principle of classification, and nearly corresponds to that adopted by Agathias. His principle of selection is unknown. The next editor was the monk Maximus Planudes (1320), who removed some epigrams from Cephalas' anthology, added some verses of his own, and preserved epigrams on works of art, which are not included in the only surviving transcript of Cephalas.

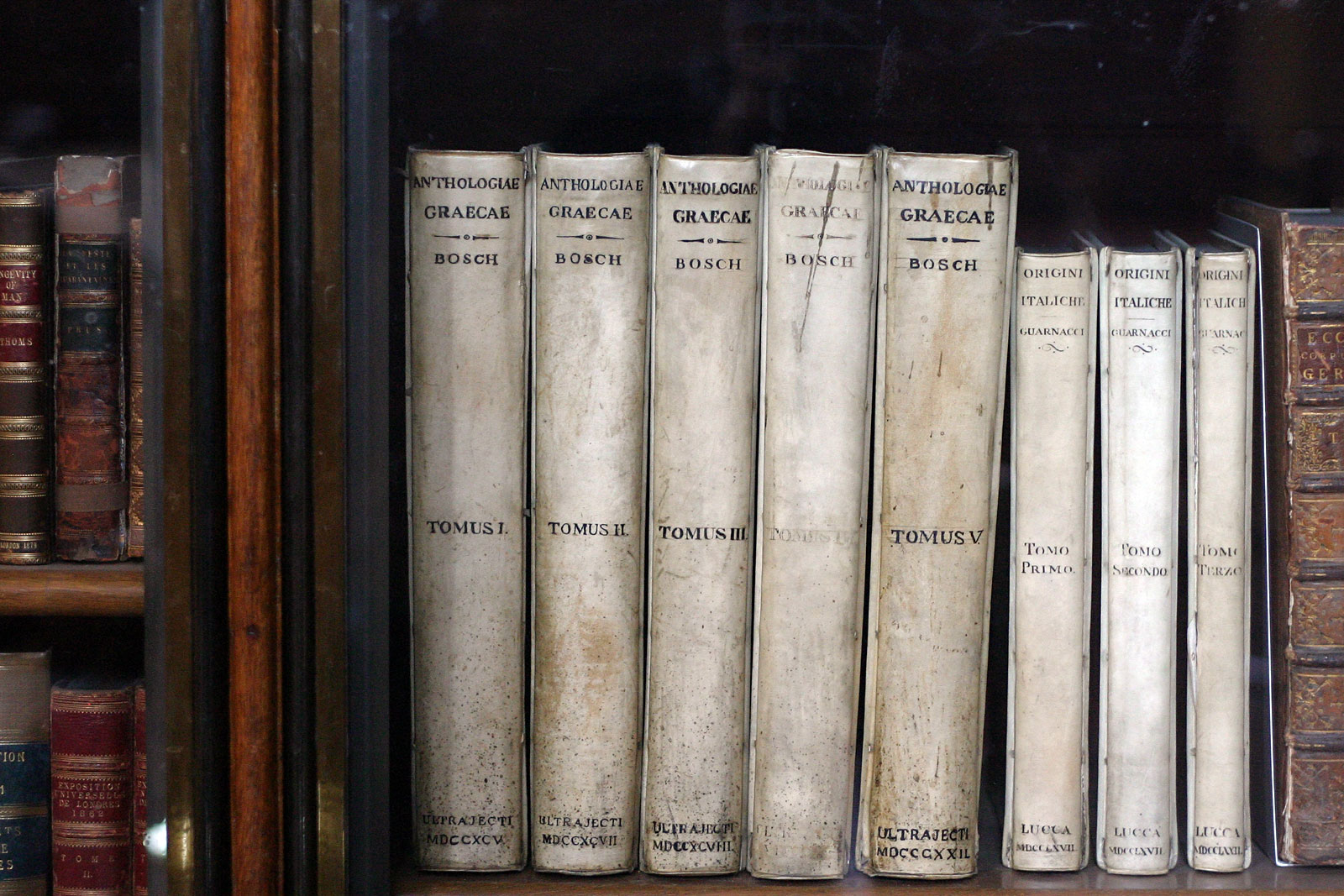
The van Bosch and van Lennep version of The Greek Anthology (in five vols., begun by Bosch in 1795, finished and published by Lennep in 1822). Photographed at The British Museum, London. Contains the metrical Latin version of Grotius's Planudean version of the Anthology. Heavily illustrated. It also reprints the very error-prone Greek text of the Wechelian edition (1600) of the Anthology, which is itself a reprint of the 1566 Planudean edition by Henricus Stephanus

The Planudean Anthology (in seven books) was the only recension of the anthology known at the revival of classical literature, and was first published at Florence, by Janus Lascaris, in 1494. It long continued to be the only accessible collection, for although the Palatine manuscript known as the Palatine Anthology, the sole extant copy of the anthology of Cephalas, was discovered in the Palatine library at Heidelberg, and copied by Saumaise (Salmasius) in 1606, it was not published until 1776, when it was included in Brunck's Analecta Veterum Poetarum Graecorum (Crumbs of the Ancient Greek Poets). The manuscript itself had frequently changed its quarters. In 1623, having been taken in the sack of Heidelberg in the Thirty Years' War, it was sent with the rest of the Palatine Library to Rome as a present from Maximilian I of Bavaria to Pope Gregory XV, who had it divided into two parts, the first of which was by far the larger; thence it was taken to Paris in 1797. In 1816 it went back to Heidelberg, but in an incomplete state, the second part remaining at Paris. It is now represented at Heidelberg by a photographic facsimile.

Brunck's edition was superseded by the standard one of Friedrich Jacobs (1794–1814, 13 vols.), the text of which was reprinted in a more convenient form in 1813–1817, and occupies three pocket volumes in the Tauchnitz series of the classics. The best edition for general purposes is perhaps that of Dubner in Didot's Bibliotheca (1864–1872), which contains the Palatine Anthology, the epigrams of the Planudean Anthology not collected in the former, an appendix of pieces derived from other sources, copious notes, a literal Latin prose translation by Jean François Boissonade, Bothe, and Lapaume and the metrical Latin versions of Hugo Grotius. A third volume, edited by E. Cougny, was published in 1890. The best edition of the Planudean Anthology is the splendid one by van Bosch and van Lennep (1795–1822). There is also an incomplete edition of the text by Hugo Stadtmüller in the Teubner series, 3 vols., which stops at IX 563 due to Stadtmüller's death. More recent editions are one in the Collection des Universités de France series, 13 vols., started by Pierre Waltz and continued by other scholars, and one edited by Hermann Beckby, 4 vols., in the Tusculum series. The most recent edition is by Fabrizio Conca, Mario Marzi and Giuseppe Zanetto, with the cooperation in vol. I of Carla Castelli, 3 vols., published by UTET.

== Arrangement ==
The Palatine MS., the archetype of the present text, was transcribed by different persons at different times, and the actual arrangement of the collection does not correspond with that signalized in the index. It is arranged into the following books:

1. Christian epigrams;
2. Christodorus's description of certain statues;
3. Inscriptions in the temple at Cyzicus;
4. The prefaces of Meleager, Philippus, and Agathias to their respective collections;
5. Amatory epigrams;
6. Votive inscriptions;
7. Epitaphs;
8. The epigrams of Gregory of Nazianzus;
9. Rhetorical and illustrative epigrams;
10. Ethical pieces;
11. Humorous and convivial;
12. Strato's Musa Puerilis;
13. Metrical curiosities;
14. Puzzles, enigmas, oracles;
15. Miscellanies.

The epigrams on works of art, as already stated, are missing from the Codex Palatinus, and must be sought in an appendix of epigrams only occurring in the Planudean Anthology. The epigrams hitherto recovered from ancient monuments and similar sources form appendices in the second and third volumes of Dübner's edition. The Liddell Scott Greek Lexicon divides the Anthologia Graeca sources into Anthologia Palatina, Planudea (1864-1968), then Appendix nova epigrammatum (1890 onward).

== Style ==
The poems in the anthology represent different periods. Four stages may be indicated:

1. The Hellenic proper, of which Simonides of Ceos (c. 556 – 469 BC), the author of most of the sepulchral inscriptions on those who fell in the Persian wars, is representative. Nearly all the pieces of this era are actual inscriptions or addresses to real personages, whether living or deceased.
2. The epigram received a great development in its second or Alexandrian era, when its range was extended to include anecdote, satire, and amorous longing; when epitaphs and votive inscriptions were composed on imaginary persons and things. The modification has a representative in Leonidas of Tarentum, a contemporary of Pyrrhus of Epirus, and closes with Antipater of Sidon, about 140 BC (or later). Callimachus, one of the Alexandrian poets, affects stern simplicity in his epigrams.
3. Meleager of Gadara was a Syrian; his pieces are usually erotic, with far-fetched conceits. His gaiety and licentiousness are imitated and exaggerated by his somewhat later contemporary, the Epicurean Philodemus, and his fancy reappears in Philodemus's contemporary, Zonas, in Crinagoras of Mytilene, who wrote under Augustus, and in Marcus Argentarius, of uncertain date. At a later period of the empire another genre, was developed, the satirical. Lucillus of Tarrha, who flourished under Nero, and Lucian, display a talent for shrewd, caustic epigram. The same style obtains with Palladas, an Alexandrian grammarian of the 4th century, the last of the strictly classical epigrammatists. His literary position is that of an indignant but despairing opponent of Christianity.
4. The fourth or Byzantine style of epigrammatic composition was cultivated at the court of Justinian. The diction of Agathias and his compeers is ornate.

== Translations and imitations ==
Latin renderings of select epigrams by Hugo Grotius were published in Bosch and Lennep's edition of the Planudean Anthology, in the Didot edition, and in Henry Wellesley's Anthologia Polyglotta. Imitations in modern languages have been copious, actual translations less common. F. D. Dehèque's 1863 translation was in French prose. The German language admits of the preservation of the original metre, a circumstance exploited by Johann Gottfried Herder and Christian Friedrich Wilhelm Jacobs.

Robert Bland, John Herman Merivale, and their associates (1806–1813), produced efforts that are often diffuse. Francis Wrangham's (1769–1842) versions, Poems (London, 1795), are more spirited; and John Sterling translated the inscriptions of Simonides. John Wilson in Blackwood's Magazine 1833–1835, collected and commented on the labours of these and other translators, including indifferent attempts of William Hay.

In 1849 Henry Wellesley, principal of New Inn Hall, Oxford, published his Anthologia Polyglotta, a collection of the translations and imitations in all languages, with the original text. In this appeared versions by Goldwin Smith and Merivale, which, with the other English renderings extant at the time, accompany the literal prose translation of the Public School Selections, executed by the Rev. George Burges for Bohn's Classical Library (1854).

In 1864 Major R. G. Macgregor published Greek Anthology, with notes critical and explanatory, an almost complete but mediocre translation of the Anthology. Idylls and Epigrams, by Richard Garnett (1869, reprinted 1892 in the Cameo series), includes about 140 translations or imitations, with some original compositions in the same style.

Further translations and selections include:

- Robert Bland, John Herman Merivale, Translations chiefly from the Greek Anthology (London, 1806)
- ——— Collections from the Greek Anthology, &c. (London; John Murray, 1813)
- George Burges, The Greek Anthology, as selected for the use of Westminster, Eton, &c. (London: Henry G. Bohn, 1855)
- Richard Garnett, Idylls and Epigrams chiefly from the Greek Anthology (London: Macmillan, 1869)
- ——— A Chaplet from the Greek Anthology (London: T. Fisher Unwin, 1892)
- Fydell Edmund Garrett, Rhymes and Renderings (Cambridge; Bowes & Bowes, 1887)
- Andrew Lang, Grass of Parnassus: Rhymes Old and New (London: Longmans, Green, & Co., 1888)
- ——— Grass of Parnassus: First and Last Rhymes (London: Longmans, Green, & Co., 1892)
- Graham R. Tomson, ed., Selections from the Greek Anthology (London: Walter Scott, 1889)
- H. C. Beeching, Love in Idleness: A Volume of Poems (London: Kegan Paul, Trench & Co., 1883)
- ——— In a Garden, and Other Poems (London: John Lane; New York: Macmillan, 1895)
- Walter Headlam, Fifty Poems of Meleager (London: Macmillan, 1890)
- ——— A Book of Greek Verse (Cambridge UP, 1907)
- J. W. Mackail, Select Epigrams from the Greek Anthology (with text, introduction, notes, and prose translation; London, 1890, revised 1906)
- L. C. Perry, From the Garden of Hellas (New York: John W. Lovell, 1891)
- W. R. Paton, Anthologiae Graecae Erotica: The Love Epigrams or Book V of the Palatine Anthology (edited, and partly rendered into English verse, London, 1898)
- Jane Minot Sidgwick, Sicilian Idylls and Other Verses Translated from the Greek (Boston: Copeland & Day, 1898)
- W. H. D. Rouse, An Echo of Greek Song (London, 1899)
- Evelyn Baring, Translations and Paraphrases from the Greek Anthology (London: Macmillan, 1903)
- J. A. Pott, Greek Love Songs and Epigrams from the Anthology (London: Kegan Paul, Trench, Trubner & Co., 1911)
- Herbert Kynaston; Edward Daniel Stone, ed., Herbert Kynaston: a short memoir with selections from his occasional writings (London: Macmillan, 1912)
- G. B. Grundy, ed., Ancient Gems in Modern Settings; being Versions of the Greek Anthology in English Rhyme by Various Writers (Oxford: Blackwell, 1913)
- James G. Legge, Echoes from the Greek Anthology (London: Constable & Co., 1919)
- Alfred J. Butler, Amaranth and Asphodel: Songs from the Greek Anthology (London: Basil Blackwell & Mott, Ltd., 1922)
- F. W. Wright, The Girdle of Aphrodite: The Complete Love Poems of the Palatine Anthology (London: G. Routledge & Sons, Ltd., 1923)
- ——— The Poets of the Greek Anthology: A Companion Volume to The Girdle of Aphrodite (London: G. Routledge & Sons, Ltd., 1924)
- Norman Douglas, Birds and Beasts of the Greek Anthology (Florence: Tipografia Giuntina, 1927)
- Robert Allason Furness, Translations from the Greek Anthology (London: Jonathan Cape, Ltd., 1931)
- J. M. Edmonds, Some Greek Poems of Love and Beauty (Cambridge UP, 1937)
- ——— Some Greek Poems of Love and Wine (Cambridge UP, 1939)
- C. M. Bowra, T. F. Higham, eds., The Oxford Book of Greek Verse in Translation (Oxford UP, 1938)
- F. L. Lucas, A Greek Garland: A Selection from the Palatine Anthology (text of 149 poems, introduction, notes, and verse translations; Oxford, 1939)
- ——— Greek Poetry for Everyman (New York: Macmillan, 1951)
- Dudley Fitts, Poems from the Greek Anthology (New York: New Directions, 1956)
- Kenneth Rexroth, Poems from the Greek Anthology (Ann Arbor: U of Michigan P, 1962)
- Andrew Sinclair, Selections from the Greek Anthology: The Wit and Wisdom of the Sons of Hellas (selection and translation; New York: Macmillan, 1967)
- Robin Skelton, Two Hundred Poems from The Greek Anthology (Seattle: U of Washington P, 1971)
- Peter Jay, The Greek Anthology and Other Ancient Greek Epigrams (Allen Lane, 1973; reprinted in Penguin Classics, 1981)
- Daryl Hine, Puerilities: Erotic Epigrams of The Greek Anthology (Princeton UP, 2001)
- Peter Constantine, Rachel Hadas, Edmund Keeley, and Karen Van Dyck, eds., The Greek Poets: Homer to the Present (New York: W. W. Norton, 2009)
- George Theodoridis, 2010,

A small volume on the Anthology, edited and with some original translations by Lord Neaves, is one of W. Lucas Collins's series Ancient Classics for Modern Readers, The Greek Anthology (Edinburgh & London: William Blackwood & Sons, 1874)

Two critical contributions to the subject are the Rev. James Davies's essay on Epigrams in the Quarterly Review (vol. cxvii.), illustrating the distinction between Greek and Latin epigram; and the disquisition in J. A. Symonds's Studies of the Greek Poets (1873; 3rd ed., 1893).

== List of poets to whom epigrams are attributed in the Greek Anthology ==
- Ablabius Illustrius
- Aceratus Grammaticus
- Adaeus of Macedonia
- Adaeus of Mytilene
- Adrianus
- Aemilianus of Nicaea
- Aeschines of Miletus
- Aeschrion of Samos
- Aeschylus
- Aesop
- Agathias
- Agis of Argos
- Alcaeus of Messene
- Alcaeus of Mytilene
- Alexander Aetolus
- Alexander of Magnesia
- Alpheus Mytilenaeus
- Ammianus
- Ammonides
- Ammonius (poet)
- Anacreon
- Anastasius Traulus
- Andronicus
- Antagoras of Rhodes
- Antigonus of Carystus
- Antimachus
- Antimedon of Cyzicus
- Antiochus
- Antipater of Sidon
- Antipater of Thessalonica
- Antiphanes of Macedon
- Antiphilus of Byzantium
- Antistius
- Antonius of Argos
- Anyte of Tegea
- Apollinarius
- Apollonides of Smyrna
- Apollonius Rhodius
- Arabius Scholasticus
- Aratus
- Archelaus Chersonesita
- Archias
- Archias of Byzantium
- Archias of Mytilene
- Archias of Macedon
- Archias the Younger'
- Archilochus
- Archimedes
- Archimelus
- Arethas
- Aristo
- Aristodicus
- Artemidorus of Tarsus
- Artemon Melopoios
- Asclepiades of Adramyttium
- Asclepiades of Samos
- Asinius Quadratus
- Athenaeus
- Automedon
- Bacchylides
- Bacis
- Besantinus
- Bianor
- Boethus
- Callias of Argos
- Callimachus
- Capito
- Carphyllides
- Cerealius
- Chaeremon
- Christodorus
- Cillactor
- Claudian the Epigrammatist
- Claudian
- Cleobulus
- Cometas
- Constantine Kephalas
- Constantinus of Rhodes
- Constantinus of Sicily
- Cornelius Longus
- Cosmas Indicopleustes
- Crates of Mallus
- Crates of Thebes
- Crinagoras of Mytilene
- Cyllenius
- Cyrillus
- Cyrus of Panopolis
- Damagetus
- Damascius
- Damocharis of Cos
- Demetrius of Bithynia
- Demiurgus
- Democritus
- Demodocus of Leros
- Diocles of Carystus
- Diodorus of Sardis
- Diodorus Grammaticus
- Diogenes of Amisus, Bishop of Amisus
- Diogenes Laërtius
- Dionysius of Andros
- Dionysius of Cyzicus
- Dionysius of Rhodes
- Dionysius the Sophist
- Diophanes of Myrina
- Dioscorides
- Diotimus of Adramyttion
- Diotimus of Athens
- Diotimus of Miletus
- Diphilus
- Dosiadas of Rhodes
- Duris of Elaea
- Empedocles
- Epigonus of Thessalonica
- Eratosthenes Scholasticus
- Erinna
- Erycius of Cyzicus
- Etruscus
- Eugenes
- Euphorion of Chalcis
- Eupithius of Athens
- Euripides
- Eutolmius
- Evenus
- Evodus
- Fronto of Emesa
- Gabriel the Prefect
- Gaetulicus
- Gallus
- Gauradas
- Germanicus Caesar
- Glaucus of Athens
- Glaucus of Nicopolis
- Glycon
- Gregory of Nazianzus
- Hecateus of Thasos
- Hedylus
- Hegemon
- Hegisippus
- Heliodorus of Emesa
- Helladius
- Heracleides of Sinope
- Heraclitus of Halicarnassus
- Hermocreon
- Hermodorus
- Herodicus of Babylon
- Homer
- Honestus
- Ignatios the Deacon
- Ignatius Magister
- Ion of Samos
- Irenaeus Referendarius
- Isidorus of Aegae
- Isidorus Scholasticus
- Joannes Barbucallus
- Julian (emperor)
- Julian Antecessor
- Julianus the Egyptian
- Laco
- Leo the Mathematician
- Leonidas of Alexandria
- Leonidas of Tarentum
- Leontius Scholasticus
- Libanius
- Lollius Bassus
- Lucian of Samosata
- Lucillius
- Lysistratus
- Macedonius of Thessalonica, Consul
- Magnus of Nisibis
- Marcus Argentarius
- Marcus Cornelius Fronto
- Marianus Scholasticus
- Marinus of Neapolis
- Meleager of Gadara
- Menander
- Menander Protector
- Menecrates of Samos
- Menecrates of Smyrna
- Mesomedes
- Metrodorus
- Michael Chartophylax
- Mimnermus
- Mnasalcas
- Moero
- Moschus
- Mundus Munatius
- Musicius
- Myrinus
- Neilus Scholasticus
- Nestor of Laranda
- Nicaenetus of Samos
- Nicander
- Nicarchus
- Nicarchus the Epigrammatist
- Nicias of Miletus
- Nicodemus of Heraclea
- Nicomachus
- Nonnus
- Nossis of Locri
- Numenius of Tarsus
- Oenomaus
- Palladas of Alexandria
- Pamphilus of Alexandria
- Pancrates of Arcadia
- Panteleius
- Parmenion of Macedonia
- Parmeno
- Paulus Silentiarius
- Peritas
- Perses of Thebes
- Phaedimus
- Phaennus
- Phalaecus
- Phanias
- Philemon
- Philetas of Samos
- Philippus of Thessalonica
- Philiscius
- Philo
- Philodemus
- Philostorgius
- Philostratus
- Philoxenus
- Phocas Diaconus
- Phocylides
- Pinytus
- Peisander
- Piso , ca. 100 AD, author of 11,424, otherwise unknown
- Pittacus of Mytilene
- Plato
- Plato Comicus
- Plato the Younger
- Polemon I of Pontus
- Pollianus
- Polyaenus of Sardis
- Polystratus
- Pompeius Macer
- Posidippus
- Proclus
- Ptolemaeus
- Pythagoras
- Quintus Maecius
- Quintus Mucius Scaevola
- Rarus
- Rhianus
- Rufinus
- Rufinus Domesticus
- Sabinus the Grammarian
- Samus
- Sappho
- Satrius
- Satyrus
- Scythinus of Teos
- Secundus of Tarantum
- Serapion of Alexandria
- Simmias of Rhodes
- Simonides of Ceos
- Socrates
- Sophronius of Jerusalem
- Speusippus
- Statilius Flaccus
- Stephanus of Byzantium
- Straton of Sardis
- Synesius of Cyrene
- Synesius Scholasticus
- Thallus of Miletus
- Theaetetus
- Theaetetus Scholasticus
- Theocritus
- Theodoretus the Grammarian
- Theodoridas
- Theodorus of Bithynia
- Theodorus
- Theodorus Illustrius
- Theognis
- Theon of Alexandria
- Theophanes Confessor
- Theosebeia
- Thomas Patricius
- Thomas Scholasticus
- Thucydides
- Thyillus
- Thymocles
- Tiberius Illustrius
- Timocreon of Rhodes
- Timon of Athens
- Trajan (Emperor)
- Troilus the Grammarian
- Tryphon
- Tudicius Gallus
- Tullius Laureas
- Tullius Sabinus
- Tymnes
- Xenocritus of Rhodes
- Xenophanes
- Zelotus
- Zenobius the Grammarian
- Zenodotus of Ephesus
- Zenodotus the Stoic
- Zonas of Sardis
- Zosimus of Thasos

== See also ==
- List of anthologies of Greek epigrams
