= Parmenion (poet) =

Parmenion was a Macedonian epigrammatic poet, whose verses were included in the collection of Philip of Thessalonica in Greek Anthology ; whence it is probable that he flourished in, or shortly before, the time of Augustus.

Richard François Philippe Brunck included fourteen of his epigrams in his Analecta, and one more in the Lectiones. Johann Jakob Reiske also attributed an anonymous epigram (No. cxxi.) to him, on the ground of the superscription Parmenontos in the Vatican MS, but that is the name, not of the author of the epigram, but of the victor who dedicated the statue to which it forms the inscription, as is clear from the epigram itself. The epigrams of Parmenion are characterized by brevity, which he himself declares (Ep. 1) that he aimed at.
