= Epigonus of Thessalonica =

Ancient Greek epigrammatist

Epigonus of Thessalonica (dates unknown) is an epigrammatist quoted in the Greek Anthology. Both the Palatine and Planudean codices attribute AP 9.261, an epigram on an ageing vine, to Epigonus; the Planudean codex attributes two more poems to him.
