= Leonidas of Alexandria =

Greek poet active in Rome (fl. 1st century AD)

Leonidas (Note: Or, more likely, Leonides (Λεωνίδης). Page points out that the attributions of his poems always use the genitive form Λεωνίδου rather than the Λεωνίδα, and that the poems themselves are in the Ionic dialect.) of Alexandria (/liˈɒnɪdəs, -dæs/; Ancient Greek: Λεωνίδας; Latin: Leonidas Alexandrinus; fl. 1st century AD) was a Greek epigrammatist active at Rome during the reigns of Nero and Vespasian. Some of his epigrams are preserved in the Greek Anthology, and in one he lays claim to having invented the isopsephic epigram.

== Life ==
Leonides was a native of Egypt: he describes himself as "Nile-born" (Νειλογενής) and some of his poetry was evidently written in Egypt. He claims that he was originally an astrologer or astronomer, but that once he devoted himself to poetry, he became more successful and was "well-known to Italians in high society". He eventually obtained the patronage of the Roman imperial family, and flourished during the reigns of Nero and Vespasian. He wrote birthday poems for Agrippina the Younger and Poppaea, among others.

== Works ==
The poems of Leonides were originally collected in at least three books. Today some forty-two epigrams survive, preserved in the Greek Anthology. These are variously attributed to "Leonides of Alexandria", "Julius Leonides", or simply "Leonides"; in a few cases they are wrongly ascribed to Leonidas of Tarentum, or the attribution is otherwise uncertain. Almost all of them are isophepic epigrams, in which the alphanumeric values of the Greek letters (α=1, β=2, etc.) are carefully balanced, so that the sums of the numerical values in each verse (in two-line epigrams), or in each couplet (in four-line epigrams), are precisely the same. Leonides claimed to be the originator of the isopsephic epigram, and while he did not invent the principle of isopsephia itself, he appears to have been the first to apply it to poems of this type.

== Sources ==
- Albiani, Maria Grazia. (2006). "Leonides of Alexandria", Brill's New Paully.
- Hunter, Richard L. (2012). "Leonidas or Leonides, of Alexandria". The Oxford Classical Dictionary (online ed.). 4th ed. Oxford: Oxford University Press. Retrieved 24 April 2023.
- Page, D. L. (1981). Further Greek Epigrams. Cambridge: Cambridge University Press. pp 503–541.
