= Archelaus Chersonesita =

Ancient Greek poet

Archelaus (Ancient Greek: Ἀρχέλαος), a poet of ancient Greece, is called in ancient sources an Egyptian, and is believed to have been a native of a town in Egypt called Chersonesus, as he is also called "Chersonesita". He wrote epigrams, some of which are still extant in the Greek Anthology.

Classical scholar Christian Friedrich Wilhelm Jacobs seemed to infer from an epigram of his on Alexander the Great that Archelaus lived in the time of Alexander and Ptolemy I Soter (that is, the 4th century BCE). Other scholars like Christian Lobeck place him in the reign of Ptolemy VIII Physcon (2nd century BCE). But both of these opinions are connected with chronological difficulties, and William Linn Westermann showed that Archelaus in all probability flourished under Ptolemy Philadelphus, around the 3rd century BCE, to whom, according to Antigonus of Carystus, he narrated wonderful stories (παράδοξα, or "paradoxes") in epigrams.

Besides this peculiar kind of epigram, Archelaus wrote a work called ἰδιοφυῆ ("strange or peculiar animals"), which seems to have likewise been written in verse, and to have treated on strange and paradoxical subjects, like his epigrams.
