= Alpheus Mytilenaeus =

Ancient Greek poet

Alpheus Mytilenaeus (Gr. Ἀλφείος Μυτιληναῖος) was the author of about twelve epigrams in the Greek Anthology, some of which seem to point out the time when he wrote. In the seventh epigram he refers to the state of the Roman Empire, as embracing almost all the known world; in the ninth he speaks of the restored and flourishing city of Troy; and in the tenth he alludes to an epigram by Antipater of Sidon. Antipater lived under Augustus, in the second half of the 1st century BC, and Troy had received great favors from Julius Caesar and Augustus. Therefore, it is not improbable that Alpheus also wrote under Augustus. It is true that in the fourth epigram he addresses a certain Macrinus, but there is no reason to suppose that this was the emperor Macrinus.
