= Aristodicus =

Aristodicus (Ancient Greek: Ἀριστόδικος) can refer to one of two people from ancient history:

- Aristodicus of Cyme, subject of a narrative of Herodotus's in which Aristodicus disagrees with the pronouncements of an oracle
- Aristodicus of Rhodes, an author from the Greek Anthology
