= Automedon (poet) =

Ancient Greek poet

Automedon (Ancient Greek: Αὐτομέδων, fl. early 1st century AD) was an ancient Greek satirical poet from Cyzicus, whose poems are preserved in the Greek Anthology.

Automedon's works were added to the Anthology by Philippus of Thessalonica, around the reign of Caligula. One of his poems satirises an orator called Nicetes who probably lived in the time of Augustus and Tiberius. It is thus likely that Automedon lived in the early first century AD.

Epigrams attributed to Automedon
Anthology #	Title / incipit	Greek title / incipit	Topic
5.129	On a prostitute dancer	εἰς πόρνην ὀρχηστρίδα	A dancer gives the poet an erection
10.23	Nicetes like the breeze, when a ship has little sail up	Νικήτης ὀλίγοις μὲν ἐπὶ προτόνοισιν ἀήτης	An orator's style compared to a ship's journey
11.29	Send and summon her	Πέμπε, κάλει	Automedon's erectile dysfunction
11.46	We are human in the evening	Ἄνθρωποι δείλης	Contrast between convivial behaviour at night and hostile behaviour in the day.
11.50	Blessed is the one who owes nothing to anyone	Εὐδαίμων, πρῶτον μὲν ὁ μηδενὶ μηδὲν ὀφείλων	A wise man avoids marriage.
11.319	Bringing ten sacks of charcoal	Ἀνθρακίων δέκα μέτρα φέρων	Athens' excessive generosity with honours.
11.324	Accept the dinner, Phoebus	Δέξαι, Φοῖβε, τὸ δεῖπνον	Apollo complains that Arrius the priest eats all his sacrifices
11.325	Yesterday, I had a goat's foot for dinner	Ἐχθὲς δειπνήσας τράγεον πόδα	The poet was invited to an unsatisfactory dinner.
11.326	Beard and shaggy thigh hair	Πώγων, καὶ λάσιαι μηρῶν τρίχες	The beautiful youth Connichus has grown old
11.346	How long, Polycarpus?	Μέχρι τίνος, Πολύκαρπε	A banker is destroyed by his faithlessness
11.361	Mules grown old together	Ἡμίονοι σύγγηροι	Description of two old mules.
12.34	With coach Demetrius	Πρὸς τὸν παιδοτρίβην Δημήτριον	Demetrius' attractive students wait on him at dinner.

One poem in the Anthology, attributed to Automedon, is ascribed in the Palatine Anthology to the third-century BC poet Theocritus and may be from that period.
