= Palladas =

Greek poet

Palladas (Ancient Greek: Παλλαδᾶς; fl. 4th century AD) was a Greek poet, who lived in Alexandria, Egypt.

== Life ==
All that is known about Palladas has been deduced from his 151 epigrams preserved in the Greek Anthology (Anthologia graeca); another twenty-three appear in that collection under his name, but his authorship is suspect. His poems describe the persona of a pagan schoolteacher resigned to life in a Christian city, and bitter about his quarrelsome wife.

== Works ==
One of the epigrams attributed to him on the authority of Maximus Planudes is a eulogy on the celebrated Hypatia, daughter of Theon of Alexandria, whose death took place in 415. Another was, according to a scholium in the Palatine Manuscript (the most important source for our knowledge of Greek epigram), written in the reign of the joint emperors Valentinian and Valens (364–375). A third epigram on the destruction of Beirut (Anth. Gr. 9.27) suggests an alternative chronology dating Palladas' activity to the age of Constantine the Great. It is based on his edition of a papyrus codex that arrived from a private collection to the Beinecke Library at Yale University in 1996. Some of his arguments in favor of this new chronology have, however, been called into question.

Plan of Alexandria, c. 30 BC

An anonymous epigram (Anth. Gr. 9.380) speaks of Palladas as having a high poetical reputation. However, Isaac Casaubon dismisses him in two contemptuous words as versificator insulsissimus ("a most coarse poet"). John William Mackail concurs with Casaubon, writing that "this is true of a great part of his work, and would perhaps be true of it all but for the savage indignation which kindles his verse, not into the flame of poetry, but to a dull red heat."

There is little direct allusion in his epigrams to the struggle against the onslaught of Christianity. One epigram speaks obscurely of the destruction of the "idols" of Alexandria popular in the archiepiscopate of Theophilus in 389; another in even more enigmatic language (Anth. Gr. 10.90) seems to be a bitter attack on the doctrine of the Resurrection; and a scornful couplet against the swarms of Egyptian monks might have been written by a Reformer of the 16th century. For the most part his sympathy with the Greco-Roman pagan tradition is only betrayed in his despondency over all things. But it is in his criticism of life that the power of Palladas lies; with a remorselessness like that of Jonathan Swift he tears the coverings from human frailty and holds it up in its meanness and misery. The lines on the Descent of Man (Anth. Gr. 10.45), fall as heavily on the Neo-Platonic martyr as on the Christian persecutor, and remain even now among the most mordant and crushing sarcasms ever passed upon mankind.

=== A Question of Gender ===
Γραμματικοῦ θυγάτηρ ἔτεκεν φιλότητι μιγεῖσα
παιδίον ἀρσενικόν, θηλυκόν, οὐδέτερον.

The dominie's daughter eloped with a suitor,
And the baby was masculine, feminine, neuter.

—Translated by Sir William Marris

This translation omits the epigram's explicit reference to the role of grammar and thus grammatical gender in thought. Compare: "A grammarian’s daughter made love and then bore/A masculine and feminine and neuter child."

The epigram's reference to the generative role of grammar underscores how the epigram is "likely quite dark: [the daughter] gave birth to twins (a boy and a girl) and at least one of them died thus giving the three declensions."

=== Tabliope ===
Tabliope (Ταβλιόπη) is a made-up name of a "Muse" that is a comic invention of Palladas, appearing in his epigram found in book 11 (Humorous and convivial - Scoptic - Σκωπτικά) of Anthologia Palatina. The name Tabliope is made up from the word τάβλα tabla > tavla (Modern Greek τάβλι tavli "backgammon"), derived from Latin "tabula", and the segment -ιόπη as in the name of the Muse Calliope ("Τάβλ"α + Καλλ"ιόπη" = "Ταβλιόπη"). The epigram, intended to make fun of an avid backgammon player, reads:

Πάντων μουσοπόλων ἠ Καλλιόπη θεός ἐστιν • Ἠ σή Καλλιόπη Ταβλιόπη λέγεται.

"Calliope is the goddess of all adherents of the Muses [i. e. arts]; but your Calliope is called Tabliope."

Some modern sources refer to Tabliope as the goddess of the gamble (games of risk and random chance).

== Date ==
Mackail groups Palladas to the same period with Aesopus and Glycon, each the author of a single epigram in the Greek Anthology. All three belong to the age of the Byzantine translators, when infinite pains were taken to rewrite well-known poems or passages in different metres, by turning Homer into elegiacs or iambics, and recasting pieces of Euripides or Menander as epigrams.
