= Simmias of Rhodes =

Greek poet

Simmias of Rhodes (Ancient Greek: Σιμμίας ὁ Ῥόδιος) was a Greek poet and grammarian of the Alexandrian school, which flourished under the early Ptolemies. He was earlier than the tragic poet Philiscus of Corcyra, whose time is about 300 BC, at least if we accept the assertion of Hephaestion (p. 31), that the choriambic hexameter, of which Philiscus claimed the invention, had been previously used by Simmias.

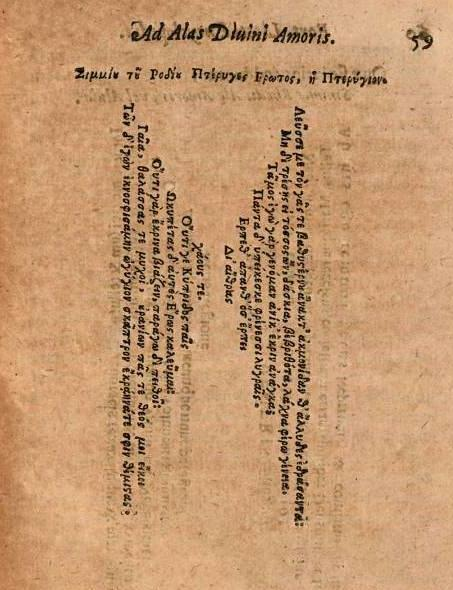
The shaped poem "Wings" in a 1640 reprint

The 10th-century encyclopaedia, the Suda, reports that Simmias wrote three books of Glossai (collections of obscure words) and four books of miscellaneous poems (ποιήματα διάφορα, poiemata diaphora); the latter part of the article in the Suda is obviously misplaced, and belongs to the life of Semonides of Amorgos. Of his grammatical works nothing more is known; but his poems are frequently referred to, and some of them seem to have been, epic. His Gorgo is quoted by Athenaeus (xi. p. 491); his Months and Apollon by Stephanus Byzantinus and a fragment of thirteen lines from the latter poem is preserved by Tzetzes (Chil. vii. 144), and has been edited by Brunck.

As an epigrammatist, Simmias had a place in the Garland of Meleager, and the Greek Anthology contains six epigrams ascribed to him, besides three short carmina figurata, poems in which the lines are arranged so that the shape of the whole composition resembles an object; those of Simmias are entitled, from their forms, the Pteryges (Wings), the Oon (Egg), and the Pelekys (Hatchet).
