= Adaeus =

Ancient Greek poet

Adaeus, or Addaeus (Ancient Greek: Ἀδαῖος or Ἀδδαῖος), a Greek epigrammatic poet, a native most probably of Macedonia. The epithet Μακεδών is appended to his name before the third epigram in the Vat. MS. (Anth. Gr. vi. 228); and the subjects of the second, eighth, ninth, and tenth epigrams agree with this account of his origin. He lived in the time of Alexander the Great, to whose death he alludes. (Anth. Gr. vii. 240.) His extant poems are chiefly about country life and hunting.

The fifth epigram (Anth. Gr. vii. 305) is inscribed Αδδαίου Μυτιληναίου, and there was a Mytilenaean of this name, who wrote two prose works Περί αγαλματοποιών (On statue-makers) and Περί Διαθέσεως (On disposition) (Athen. xiii. p. 606. A, xi. p. 471, F.) The time when he lived cannot be fixed with certainty. Reiske, though on insufficient grounds, believes these two to be the same person. (Anth. Grace, vi. 228, 2589 vii. 51, 238, 240, 305, x. 20; Brunck, Anal. ii. p. 224; Jacobs, xiii. p. 831.) [C. P. M.]

There was also another Adaeus, a rhetorician, to whom Seneca the elder frequently refers.

== See also ==
- Greek Anthology
