= Crinagoras of Mytilene =

Crinagoras of Mytilene, sometimes spelt as Krinagorasis or Krinagoras (Greek: Κριναγόρας ὁ Μυτιληναῖος, 70 BC–18) was a Greek epigrammatist and ambassador, who lived in Rome as a court poet.

== Life ==
Crinagoras was born around 70 BC and was from Mytilene on the island of Lesbos. Inscriptions record that he was part of delegations to Rome in 48 or 47 BC and 45 BC, and to Tarragona in 26/25 BC. In Rome he was part of the circle of Augustus' sister Octavia. He lived until at least 11 AD.

== Works ==
Crinagoras was the author of fifty-one epigrams, which are in the Greek Anthology. In these epigrams, Crinagoras blames himself for the hanging of wealthy patrons and several epigrams are small presents to children of his Roman noble friends. He sent an epigram addressed to Augustus’ nephew Marcus Claudius Marcellus, which with the epigram had a copy of the poems written by Greek poet Callimachus. Later Crinagoras sent Marcellus another epigram on his return from the war with the Cantabri. Other epigrams by Crinagoras were dedicated to the future emperor Tiberius, congratulating him on his military victories in Armenia and Germany and to Augustus’ niece Antonia Minor. In another epigram, Crinagoras speaks of a sea voyage that he undertook from Asia to Italy, visiting the Cyclades and Corfu on the way.

The most well known epigram by Crinagoras was the epigram that is considered to the eulogy of Ptolemaic Greek Princess and Roman Client Queen of Mauretania, Cleopatra Selene II:

The moon herself grew dark, rising at sunset,
Covering her suffering in the night,
Because she saw her beautiful namesake, Selene,
Breathless, descending to Hades,
With her she had had the beauty of her light in common,
And mingled her own darkness with her death.

Crinagoras had written the above epigram, assuming that an eclipse had occurred at the time of Selene’s death at sunset. However, there is a possibility that Crinagoras was using a simple poetic metaphor for her death playing on a lunar aspect of Selene’s name. It is also possible that the epigram was written during his first visit to Rome in 45 establishing his reputation. If this were the case it would then refer to a different Selene, namely Cleopatra II Selene.
