= Heraclitus of Halicarnassus =

Hellenistic Greek poet of the 3rd century BC

Heraclitus of Halicarnassus (Ancient Greek: Ἡράκλειτος ὁ Ἁλικαρνασσεύς, romanized: Herakleitos ho Halikarnasseus; 3rd century BC) was an elegiac poet of the Hellenistic period.

Heraclitus was from the Greek-Carian city of Halicarnassus on the south-west coast of Anatolia. He was a contemporary and friend of Callimachus of Cyrene, who wrote a memorial epigram on him which is preserved in Diogenes Laërtius. Only one poem by Heraclitus himself – an epigram on a mother who died in childbirth giving birth to twins – is extant in the Greek Anthology.

== Bibliography ==
- "Heracleitus (3)", William Smith (ed.) Dictionary of Greek and Roman Biography and Mythology. 3. Boston: Little, Brown & Co., 1867.
- The Greek Anthology II (Loeb Classical Library) translated by W. R. Paton. London: Heinemann; New York: G. P. Putnam's Sons, 1916.
