= Bianor (poet) =

1st-century Greek poet

Bianor was a first century Greek poet from Bithynia, the author of 22 epigrams in the Greek Anthology. His poetry was influenced by that of Leonidas of Tarentum.
