= Cometas =

Greek Byzantine grammarian and epigrammatist

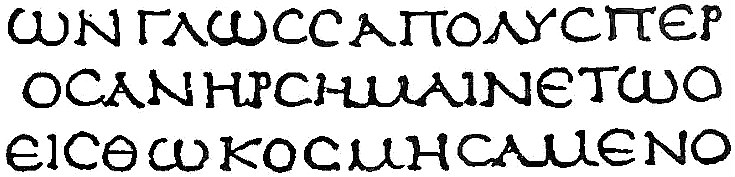
A fragment of the second book of the Iliad in an early uncial hand, 2nd century AD. Cometas despaired of the many errors which had crept into subsequent copies of the text.

Cometas Scholasticus (Greek: Κομητᾶς Σχολαστικός; fl. c. mid 9th century AD), also known by the epithet Chartularius (Χαρτουλάριος, "record-keeper"), was a Byzantine grammarian (γραμματικός) and epigrammatist.

In AD 857, during the reign of Michael III, Cometas was made Professor of Grammar by Bardas at the new school in the Magnaura founded by Leo the Mathematician. His literary output included epigrams, of which six are extant in the Greek Anthology, and a revised text or recension of the Homeric epics, now lost, but proudly referenced in three of the epigrams. Cometas speaks of having "punctuated and polished" the corrupt texts and removed the "filth" (σαπρίαν) which had accrued to them over time.

== Bibliography ==
- The Greek Anthology I, III, V (Loeb Classical Library) translated by W. R. Paton (London: Heinemann, 1916)
- Baldwin, Barry. "The Homeric Scholarship of Cometas." Hermes, vol. 113, no. 1, 1985, pp. 127–128. JSTOR, www.jstor.org/stable/4476422. Accessed 12 Aug. 2021.
- "Cometas", William Smith (ed.) Dictionary of Greek and Roman Biography and Mythology. Vol. I (London, 1870)
