= Metrodorus (grammarian) =

6th-century Greek grammarian and mathematician

Metrodorus (Ancient Greek: Μητρόδωρος; fl. c. 6th century) was a Greek grammarian and mathematician, who collected mathematical epigrams which appear in the Greek Anthology.

Nothing is known about the life of Metrodorus. The time he lived is not certain: he may have lived as early as the 3rd century AD, but it is more likely that he lived in the time of the emperors Anastasius I and Justin I, in the early 6th century.

His name occurs in connection with 45 mathematical epigrams which are to be found in book 14 of the Greek Anthology. Although he may have authored some of the epigrams, it is generally accepted that he collected most of them, and some of them may predate the 5th century BC. Many of the epigrams lead to simple equations, and they are of the same type as those found in the Rhind Mathematical Papyrus (17th century BC). Among the problems Metrodorus collected are:

- Twenty-three simple equations with one unknown, one of which is the famous epigram which reveals the age of Diophantus.
- Twelve are easy simultaneous equations with two unknowns.
- One gives a simultaneous equation with three unknowns.
- Six are problems about filling and emptying vessels by pipes.
