= Antiphilus (disambiguation) =

Antiphilus is an ancient Greek male name. It can refer to any of the following:

- Antiphilus, ancient Greek painter
- Antiphilus, ancient Greek mentioned by Pausanias as the architect of the treasury of the Carthaginians at Olympia
- Antiphilus, Athenian general appointed as the successor of Leosthenes in the Lamian War in 323 BCE, and gained a victory over Leonnatus
- Antiphilus of Byzantium, a writer of epigrams
