= Synesius Scholasticus =

6th-century Byzantine poet

Synesius Scholasticus was a Greek poet of the 6th century, who is the author of an epigram preserved in the Greek Anthology on a statue of Hippocrates. He appears to have lived shortly before the destruction of Berytus by an earthquake in 551 CE. Another poem in the Greek Anthology credits him with a victory in battle, possibly against Khosrow I in 540.
