= Marcus Argentarius =

Ancient Greek poet

Marcus Argentarius (Ancient Greek: Μάρκος Ἀργεντάριος; fl. c. AD 60) was a Greek epigrammatist.

Some thirty-seven epigrams are attributed to Marcus in the Greek Anthology, most of which are erotic, and some are plays on words. Stylistic evidence suggests he wrote during the early days of the Roman Empire, certainly not later than the middle of the first century AD, and his received epithet (argentarius, "money changer") supports a commercial Roman connection, but nothing more is known of his age.

== Bibliography ==
- Anthol. Graec. XIII. pp. 860–861.
- The Greek Anthology , , , , (Loeb Classical Library) translated by W. R. Paton. London: Heinemann, 1916–18.
- Higham, T. F. and C. M. Bowra (eds.) The Oxford Book of Greek Verse in Translation. Oxford: Oxford University Press, 1938.
- Smith, William (ed.) "M. Argentarius". Dictionary of Greek and Roman Biography and Mythology, Vol. III, 1870.
