= Theodoridas of Syracuse =

Theodoridas of Syracuse (Ancient Greek: Θεοδωρίδας ὁ Συρακούσιος) was a lyric and epigrammatic poet from Syracuse, Magna Graecia, who is supposed to have lived at the same time as Euphorion, about 235 BC; for, on the one hand, Euphorion is mentioned in one of the epigrams of Theodoridas, and, on the other hand, Clement of Alexandria quotes a verse of Euphorion ἐν ταῖς πρὸς Θεωρίδαν ἀντιγραφαῖς, where Schneider suggests the emendation Θεοδωρίδαν.

He had a place in the Garland of Meleager. In addition to the eighteen epigrams ascribed to him in the Greek Anthology, about the genuineness of some of which there are doubts, he wrote a lyric poem Εἰς Ἔρωτα, upon which a commentary was written by Dionysius, named ὁ Λεπτός, a dithyramb titled "The Centaurs" (Κένταυροι), licentious verses of the kind called φλύακες, and some other poems, of which we have a few fragments, but not the titles. The name is more than once confused with Theodorus (Θεόδωρος) and Theodoritos (Θεοδώριτος).
