= Arabius =

Arabius may refer to:

- Arabius Scholasticus, 6th century Greek writer
- Arabius (mythology), two characters in Greek mythology
- Arabius, a name given the Hub River in Pakistan by ancient Greek historian Arrian

== See also ==
- Phrynichus Arabius (Phrynichus the Arab), 2nd century Greek grammarian
