= Thallus (disambiguation) =

Thallus is an undifferentiated vegetative tissue of some non-mobile organisms.

Thallus may also refer to:

- Thallus (historian), the chronologer/historian
- Thallus (poet), the Roman era Greek epigrammatist

== See also ==
- Thallium, a toxic element named after the scientific term due to the green color it produces in flame
- Thali dialect, also known as Thalli, a dialect of Pakistan
