= Besantinus =

Ancient Greek epigrammatist of the Roman period

Besantinus (Greek: Βησαντῖνος; Bēsantînos, 2nd century AD) was a Greek epigrammatist of the Roman period who flourished in Hadrian's era and was possibly from Rhodes.

== Works ==
"The Altar"

The black cloud of victims does not, like purple, dye me with its reddening stream, and the knives sharpened on the Naxian stone spare the flocks of Pan; the sweet-scented juice of the Arabian trees does not blacken me with its curling smoke. Thou seest in me an altar not composed of golden bricks or the clods of Alybe, nor let that altar be like to me which the two gods born in Cynthus built, taking the horns of the goats that feed about the smooth ridges of Cynthus. For together with the children of Heaven did the earth-born Nine rear me, the Muses to whose art the King of the gods granted immortality. And mayest thou, who drinkest of the spring that the Gorgon's son opened with a blow of his hoof, sacrifice and pour on me libations in abundance sweeter than the honey of Hymettus' bees. Come to meet me with a confident heart, for I am pure of the venomous monsters which lay hid on that altar in Neae of Thrace that the thief of the purple ram dedicated to thee, Trito-born, hard by Myrina.

The Vatican MS. of the Greek Anthology wrongly attributes to an author of this name two epigrams, of which one is also ascribed to Pallas, (Note: Anal. ii. p. 435, No. 134; Jacobs, iii. p. 142.) and the other (Note: Jacobs, Paral. ex Cod. Vat. 42, xiii. p. 651.) is included among the epigrams of Theognis. (Note: Vv. 527, 528, Bekk.) (Note: Anthologia Palatina 9,118 = Theognis 527f., cf. Stobaeus 4,50,44.) This latter epigram is quoted by Stobaeus as "Theognis or Besantinus". (Note: Tit. 116.11.)

The "Egg" of Simmias (Note: Anal. i. p. 207, Jacobs, i. p. 140.) bears the following title in the Vatican MS.: Βησαντίνου Ῥόδιου ὠὸν ἢ Δωσιάδα ἢ Σιμμίου ἀμφότεροι Ῥόδιοι. (Note: Anthologia Palatina 15,27.) Hence we may infer that Besantinus was a fellow Rhodian.

An author of this name is repeatedly quoted in the Etymologicum Magnum, (Note: Etym. M., pp. 608, 1. 57, 685, 1. 56, Sylb.) whom Fabricius (Note: Johann Albert Fabricius, Bibliotheca Graeca 10.772.) rightly identifies with the Helladius Besantinus of Photius.

The name is also spelt Bisantinus (Βισαντῖνος, Bisantînos). (Note: Etymologicum Magnum, p. 212. 49; Johann Albert Fabricius, Bibliotecha Graeca iv. p. 467.)

=== The Altar ===
Two manuscripts (Note: F and Y.) of the Bucolics of Theocritus attribute to Besantinus a βωμός (bōmós), a pattern poem in the shape of an altar: 26 verses in different metres forming the eulogising acrostic Ὀλύμπιε πολλοῖς ἔτεσι θυσείας ("Olympian, mayst thou sacrifice for many years"), that is certainly addressed to Hadrian. (Note: cf. ThGL 5,1924A.)

== See also ==
- Altar poem
- Concrete poetry

=== Bibliography ===
- Degani, Enzo (2006). "Besantinus". In Salazar, Christine F. (ed.). Brill’s New Pauly Online.
- Hopkinson, Neil (2015). "Besantinus: The Altar". Theocritus. Moschus. Bion. Loeb Classical Library 28. Cambridge, MA: Harvard University Press.
- Paton, W. R. (1916). The Greek Anthology V. Loeb Classical Library. London: William Heinemann; New York: G. P. Putnam's Sons.
- Smith, Philip (1867). "Besantinus". In Smith, William (ed.). Dictionary of Greek and Roman Biography and Mythology. 1. Boston: Little, Brown & Co.
