= Apollonides of Smyrna =

Apollonides of Smyrna (Ancient Greek: Ἀπολλωνίδης ὁ Σμυρναῖος) was an epigrammatic poet of ancient Greece, who lived in the time of the Roman emperors Augustus and Tiberius. The Greek Anthology contains upwards of thirty epigrams which bear his name, and which are distinguished for their beautiful simplicity of style as well as of sentiment. The philologist Johann Jakob Reiske was inclined to consider this poet as the same man as Apollonides of Nicaea, and moreover to suppose that the poems in the Greek Anthology were the productions of two different persons of the name of Apollonides, the one of whom lived in the reign of Augustus and the other in that of Hadrian, but there is no ground for this hypothesis.

In the Dictionary of Greek and Roman Biography and Mythology, his name is rendered "Apollodorus of Smyrna", but this is not otherwise found anywhere.
