= Admetus (disambiguation) =

Admetus or Admetos (Ancient Greek: Ἄδμητος) may refer to:

== Mythology ==
- Admetus, mythological king of Pherae in Thessaly
- Admetus, son of Augeas

== People ==
- Admetus (epigrammatist), 2nd-century Greek poet
- Admetus of Epirus (before 450 BC), king of the Molossians
- Admetus of Macedon (died 332 BC), General of Alexander the Great

== Other uses ==
- Admetus (horse), a French-bred Thoroughbred racehorse
- Admeto, an opera of Handel
