= Athenaeus (poet) =

Ancient Greek poet

Athenaeus (Ancient Greek: Ἀθήναιος) was an epigrammatic poet whose work was mentioned by the historian Diogenes Laërtius. He was the author of two epigrams in the Greek Anthology. Of his date, we know only that he lived in or before the 3rd century CE.
