= Dioscorides (poet) =

Ancient Greek poet

Dioscorides (Greek: Διοσκουρίδης, Dioskourídēs; 3rd century BC) was a Greek epigrammatist of the Hellenistic period.

== Life ==
Dioscorides seems, from the internal evidence of his epigrams, to have lived in Egypt, about the time of Ptolemy Euergetes.

== Works ==
Dioscorides was the author of thirty-nine epigrams in the Greek Anthology. (Note: Brunck, Anal. i. 493; Jacobs, i. 244; xiii. 706, No. 142.) His epigrams are chiefly upon the great men and women of antiquity, especially the poets. One of them would seem, from its title in the Vatican MS., Διοσκορίδου Νικοπολίτου, to be the production of a later writer.

The epigrams of Dioscorides were included in the Garland of Meleager. (Note: Jacobs, xiii. pp. 886, 887.)
