= Heracleides of Sinope =

Heracleides of Sinope (Ancient Greek: Ἡρακλείδης ὁ Σινωπεύς) was a writer of ancient Greece. Under this name we possess a Greek epigram in the Greek Anthology. It is not improbable that two other epigrams are likewise his productions, though his native place is not mentioned there. He seems to have been a poet of some celebrity, as Diogenes Laërtius mentions him as ἐπιγραμμάτων ποιητὴς λιγυρός. Diogenes Laërtius mentions fourteen persons of this name.
