= Alcaeus of Messene =

3rd-century BC Greek poet

Alcaeus of Messene (/ælˈsiːəs/; Greek: Ἀλκαῖος ὁ Μεσσήνιος) was an ancient Greek poet, who flourished between 219 and 196 BC. Twenty-two of his short poems or epigrams survive in the Greek Anthology, from some of which his date may be fixed at around the late 3rd/early 2nd century BC. Some of his poems are on literary themes, but most are political.

Alcaeus was contemporary with Philip V, king of Macedon and son of Demetrius II of Macedon, against whom several of his poems are pointed, apparently from patriotic feelings. One of these, however, gave more offense to the Roman general Flamininus than to Philip, as Alcaeus ascribed the victory of the battle of Cynoscephalae to the Aetolians as much as to the Romans. Philip contented himself with writing an epigram in reply to that of Alcaeus, in which he gave the Messenian a very broad hint of the fate he might expect if he fell into his hands. This reply was enough to lead French classical scholar Claudius Salmasius to suppose that Alcaeus was actually crucified by Philip. In another epigram, in praise of Flamininus, the mention of the Roman general's name, Titus, led John Tzetzes into the error of imagining the existence of an epigrammatist named Alcaeus under the emperor Titus. Those epigrams of Alcaeus which bear internal evidence of their date were written between the years 219 and 196.

Of the 22 epigrams in the Greek Anthology which bear the name of Alcaeus, two are written "Alcaeus of Mytilene"; but most scholars take this to be the addition of some ignorant copyist. Others bear the name of "Alcaeus of Messene," and some of Alcaeus alone. But in the last class there are several which must, from internal evidence, have been written by Alcaeus of Messene, and there seems no reason to doubt his being the author of all twenty-two.
