= Archimelus =

3rd-century BC Greek writer

Archimelus (Ancient Greek: Ἀρχίμηλος) was a writer of ancient Greece who was the author of an epigram on the great ship of Hiero II of Syracuse, which appears to have been built about 220 BCE. The writer Athenaeus recounts a story wherein Hiero supplied Archimelus with 1000 medimnoi (around 1500 bushels) of wheat as payment for this epigram.

To this epigram the classical scholar Richard François Philippe Brunck added another, on an imitator of Euripides, the author of which, however, in the Vatican manuscript is "Archimedous" (Ἀρχιμήδους) not "Archimelus", which there is no good reason for altering, as we have no other mention of a poet named "Archimelus".

Other scholars propose that there never was any such person as "Archimelus", and the entire story is a fabrication, citing the fact that the only mention of him occurs in Athenaeus, as well as the general unlikeliness of the story in certain details such as the timing of the epigram and the size of the ship.
