= Lucillius =

Lucillius (Ancient Greek: Λουκίλλιος; fl. 60s CE) was the author of one hundred twenty three epigrams in Greek preserved in the Greek Anthology. He lived under the emperor Nero. Many of his poems describe stereotyped people, such as doctors or thin people; as such his works are in the tradition of the Characters of Theophrastus. He influenced the Latin epigrammatist Martial. Beyond his name no details of his life are known. Sometimes his name is (incorrectly) spelled "Lucilius", creating confusion with the Roman satirist Lucilius.
