= Andronicus (poet) =

Andronicus (Ancient Greek: Ἀνδρόνικος) was a poet of Roman Greece.

Andronicus was a contemporary of the emperor Constantius II, around 360 AD. The sophist rhetorician Libanius wrote that the sweetness of his poetry gained him the favor of all the towns (probably of Egypt) as far as the Ethiopians, but that the full development of his talents was checked by the death of his mother and the misfortune of his native town (which may have been Hermopolis).

If Andronicus is the same as the Andronicus mentioned by Photios I of Constantinople as the author of dramas and various other poems, he was a native of Hermopolis in Egypt, of which town he was decurio. Themistius, who speaks of a young poet in Egypt as the author of a tragedy, epic poems, and dithyrambs, appears likewise to allude to this Andronicus. In 359, Andronicus, with several other persons in the east and in Egypt, incurred the suspicion of indulging in pagan practices. He was tried by Paulus Catena, whom the emperor had despatched for the purpose, but he was found innocent and acquitted.

No fragments of Andronicus' works are extant, with the exception of an epigram in the Greek Anthology.
