= Joannes Barbucallus =

5th century Greek poet

Joannes Barbucallus (Ancient Greek: Ἰωάννης Βαρβουκάλλος) was a Greek writer of the 6th century CE.

He is the author of eleven epigrams in the Greek Anthology. From internal evidence, scholars generally fix his date to about 551 CE, as several of his poems describe the 551 Beirut earthquake.

The Scholiast derives his name from "Barbucale" or "Arbucale", a city near the Ebro river in the northeast corner of Spain mentioned by the writers Polybius, Livy, and Stephanus of Byzantium, but which is otherwise unknown. The reasoning for this is unclear however. Other scholars, such as Karelisa Hartigan, have supposed that he was a native of Berytus, owing to his several poems about that city.
