= Phaedimus of Bisanthe =

Phaedimus of Bisanthe (Greek: Φαίδιμος Βισανθηνός; 2nd century BC) was an ancient Greek poet from Bisanthe (eastern Thrace) and author of an epic, called the Heracleia according to Athenaeus. In the introduction of the Garland of Meleager, l. 51. (Greek Anthology xiii), where Meleagre mentions the poets whom he anthologized, he is mentioned as The yellow iris of Phaedimus. The four poems attributed to him in the Greek Anthology include a dedication and an epitaph.
