= Chaeremon =

4th-century BC Greek dramatist and poet

Chaeremon (/kəˈriːmən, -mɒn/; Ancient Greek: Χαιρήμων, gen.: Χαιρήμονος) was an Athenian dramatist of the first half of the fourth century BC. He was generally considered a tragic poet like Choerilus. Aristotle said his works were intended for reading, not for representation. According to the Suda, Chaeremon was also a comic poet, and the title of at least one of his plays (Achilles Thersitoktonos, "Achilles slayer of Thersites") seems to indicate that it was a satyric drama. His Centaurus (or Centaur) is described by Aristotle as a rhapsody in all kinds of metres. His other known plays are Alphesiboea, Dionysus, Io, Minyae, Odysseus, Oeneus, and Thyestes.

The fragments of Chaeremon are distinguished by correctness of form and facility of rhythm, but marred by a florid and affected style reminiscent of Agathon. He especially excelled in descriptions (irrelevantly introduced) dealing with such subjects as flowers and female beauty. It is not agreed whether he is the author of the three epigrams in the Greek Anthology (Palatine vii. 469, 720, 721) which bear his name. His maxim, "Luck, not wisdom, rules the affairs of men," was adopted by Plutarch as the epigraph to his essay on chance.
