= Artemon Melopoios =

Ancient Greek writer of the 1st century

Artemon (Ancient Greek: Ἀρτέμων), called "Melopoios" (Μελοποιός), from his being a Melic poet, appears to have been a contemporary of the comic playwright Aristophanes.

It is usually believed that he is the author of the two epigrams still extant in the Greek Anthology.
