= Aristodicus of Rhodes =

Ancient Greek author

Aristodicus (Ancient Greek: Ἀριστόδικος) of Rhodes was the author of one or possibly two epigrams in the Greek Anthology, but little further is known about him. Most scholars believe these originally came from The Garland of Meleager of Gadara.

The first epigram, about a cricket, the author "Aristodicus" is described as "a Rhodian", but in the second epigram, about arithmetic, the author is called just "Aristodicus" and there is no further descriptor given, so it is impossible to know if these were intended to denote the same person.
