= Tymnes (poet) =

Tymnes (Greek: Τύμνης) was an epigrammatic poet, whose epigrams were included in the Garland of Meleager, but respecting whose exact date we have no further evidence; for the grounds on which Reiske supposes that he was a Cretan, and that he was contemporary with Meleager, are very slight. There are seven of his epigrams in the Greek Anthology.

== Namesake ==
Tymnes occurs, as a Carian name, in Herodotus.
