= Antipater of Sidon =

Ancient Greek poet; best known for his list of the Seven Wonders of the World

Antipater of Sidon (Greek: Ἀντίπατρος ὁ Σιδώνιος, Antipatros ho Sidonios) was an ancient Greek poet of the 2nd and 1st centuries BCE.

Cicero mentions him living in Rome during the time of Quintus Lutatius Catulus, and calls him a brilliant epigrammist, sometimes too fond of imitation. His poems, about 75 of which are preserved in the Greek Anthology, are mostly epitaphs and ecphrastic poems. 96 poems in the Greek Anthology are attributed simply to "Antipater", without an indication of whether they are by Antipater of Sidon or the later Antipater of Thessalonica, and it is difficult to identify which are his.

One of his poems gives one of the earliest known lists of the Seven Wonders of the Ancient World.

I have set eyes on the wall of lofty Babylon on which is a road for chariots, and the statue of Zeus by the Alpheus, and the hanging gardens, and the Colossus of the Sun, and the huge labour of the high pyramids, and the vast tomb of Mausolus; but when I saw the house of Artemis that mounted to the clouds, those other marvels lost their brilliancy, and I said, "Lo, apart from Olympus, the Sun never looked on aught so grand."

== Sources ==
- Jean-Claude Polet, Patrimoine littéraire européen, v. II, De Boeck Université, 1992. (in French)
- Rolf Toman, Barbara Borngasser, and Achim Bednorz, "History of Architecture: From Classic to Contemporary". New York: Parragon, [n.d.]
