= Agis of Argos =

4th-century BC Greek poet

Agis (/ˈeɪdʒɪs/; Greek: Ἄγις, gen.: Ἄγιδος) was an Ancient Greek poet from Argos, and a contemporary of Alexander the Great, whom he accompanied on his Asiatic expedition. Quintus Curtius Rufus as well as Arrian and Plutarch describe him as a sycophant, one of the basest flatterers of the king. Curtius calls him "the composer of the worst poems after Choerilus" ("pessimorum carminum post Choerilum conditor"), which probably refers rather to their obsequious, flattering character than to their worth as poetry. The Greek Anthology contains an epigram which is probably the work of this flatterer.

Athenaeus mentions an Agis as the author of a work on the art of cooking (ὀψαρτυτικά).
