= Antonius of Argos =

Epigrammatist of the Greek Anthology

Antonius of Argos (Ancient Greek: Ἀντώνιος ὁ Ἀργεῖος) was a poet of ancient Greece. One of his epigrams is still extant in the Greek Anthology.
