= Thallus (poet) =

Thallus of Miletus (Greek: Θαλλός), was an epigrammatic poet, five of whose epigrams are preserved in the Greek Anthology. Of these the first is in honour of the birthday of a Roman emperor, or one of the imperial family, on which account Bovinus supposes the poet to be the same person who is mentioned in an extant inscription as a freedman of Germanicus. The name is given in various forms: Thalos, Thyelaus, Thyillus; it may have arisen from a confusion between the poet and the celebrated philosopher, Thales of Miletus. The name Thallos occurs frequently in inscriptions from Attica and Ionia.

== Sources ==
- Pape, Worterbuch d. Griecli. Eigennamen; Brunck, Anal. vol. ii. p. 164; Jacobs, Anth. Graec. vol. ii. p. 150, vol. xiii. p. 956; Fabric. Bibl. Graec. vol. iv. p. 496.)
