= Gabrielius =

Gabrielius (Greek: Γαβριήλιος), also called Gabriel (Γαβριήλ), served as prefect of Constantinople during the reign of Emperor Justinian. He is also called Gabrielius the Prefect or Gabriel the Prefect. A poem by Leontius Scholasticus, honoring a statue of Gabrielius, is included in the Greek Anthology. The Anthology also contains an epigram written by Gabrielius himself. The Byzantine scholar Johannes Laurentius Lydus dedicated three of his works to Gabriel (likely Gabrielius).
