= Pancrates of Arcadia =

Ancient Greek poet

Pancrates of Arcadia (Greek: Παγκράτης Ἀρκάς, Latin: Pancrates Arcadius) was a Greek poet of antiquity born in Arcadia, author of a poem on fishing entitled Halieuticus or Labours of the Sea (Ἁλιευτικά or Θαλάσσια ἔργα). Three fragments are preserved in Athenaeus' Deipnosophistae.

He might be the same person as either Pancrates the epigrammatist who appears in the Garland of Meleager and the Greek Anthology, or Pancrates the musician or poet quoted by Plutarch, or both.
