= Nicarchus =

Nicarchus or Nicarch (Ancient Greek: Νίκαρχος) was a Greek poet and writer of the 1st century AD, best known for his epigrams, of which forty-two survive under his name in the Greek Anthology, and his satirical poetry. He was a contemporary of, and influence on, the better-known Latin writer Martial. A large proportion of his epigrams are directed against doctors. Some of his writings have been found at Oxyrhynchus in Egypt.

A fragment of Nicarchus:

The Raven

The gloom of death is on the raven’s wing,
The song of death is in the raven’s cries:
But when Demophilus begins to sing,
The raven dies.

Nicarchus is also the name of a character in a play of Aristophanes, The Acharnians.

Nicarchus was also the name of a Paeonian king, known only from his issuing of a coin. He was perhaps of the late 4th century BC.
