= Antiphilus of Byzantium =

Antiphilus of Byzantium (Ancient Greek: Ἀντίφιλος ὁ Βυζάντιος) was a writer of epigrams who lived about the time of the Roman emperor Nero, as appears from one of his epigrams in which he mentions the favor conferred by that emperor upon the island of Rhodes.

== Epigrams ==
The number of Antiphilus' epigrams still extant is upwards of forty, and most of them are superior in conception and style to the majority of these compositions. Byzantine scholar Johann Jakob Reiske, in his notes on the Greek Anthology of Constantine Cephalas, was led, by the difference of style in some of the poems bearing the name of Antiphilus, to suppose that there were two or three poets of this name, and that their productions were all by mistake ascribed to the one poet of Byzantium. Other scholars think there is not sufficient ground for such an hypothesis.
