= Paul the Silentiary =

Greek poet

Paul the Silentiary, also known as Paulus Silentiarius (Greek: Παῦλος ὁ Σιλεντιάριος, died AD 575–580), was a Greek Byzantine poet and courtier to the emperor Justinian at Constantinople.

== Life ==
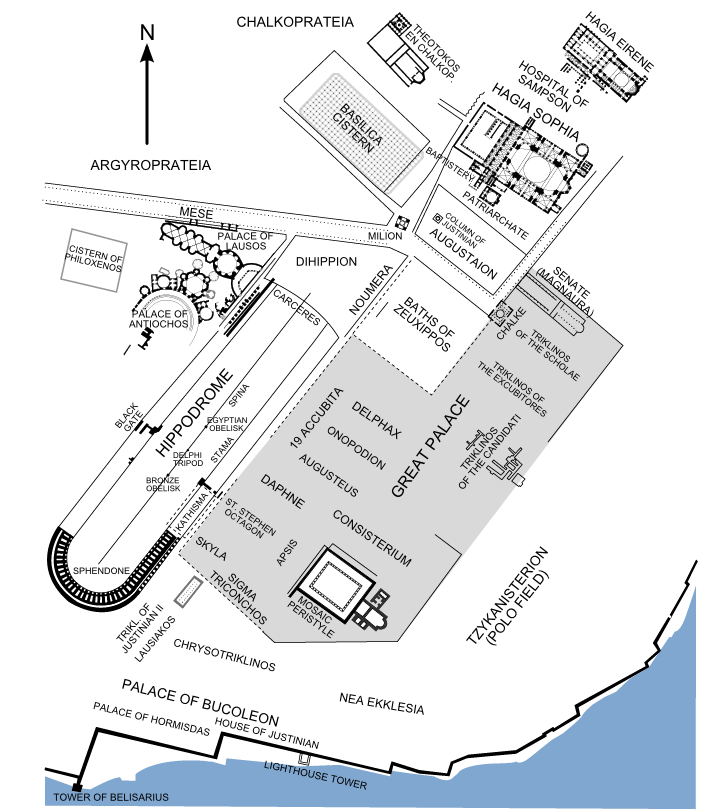
Plan of the imperial district of Byzantine Constantinople

What little we know of Paul's life comes largely from the contemporary historian and poet Agathias, a friend and admirer, who describes him as coming from a rich and illustrious family, with a father, Cyrus, and a grandfather, Florus, who both probably held public office.

Paul also entered public life and became a silentiary – one of a group of 30 court officials of privileged backgrounds organised under three officers (decurions) whose first duty was maintaining order and silence in the Great Palace of Constantinople. They also fulfilled important commissions, especially in church matters, and by the sixth century their order had attained the social rank of illustris, the highest in the late empire. Paul himself may have risen to become their chief (primicerius). He died some time between 575 and 580.

== Works ==
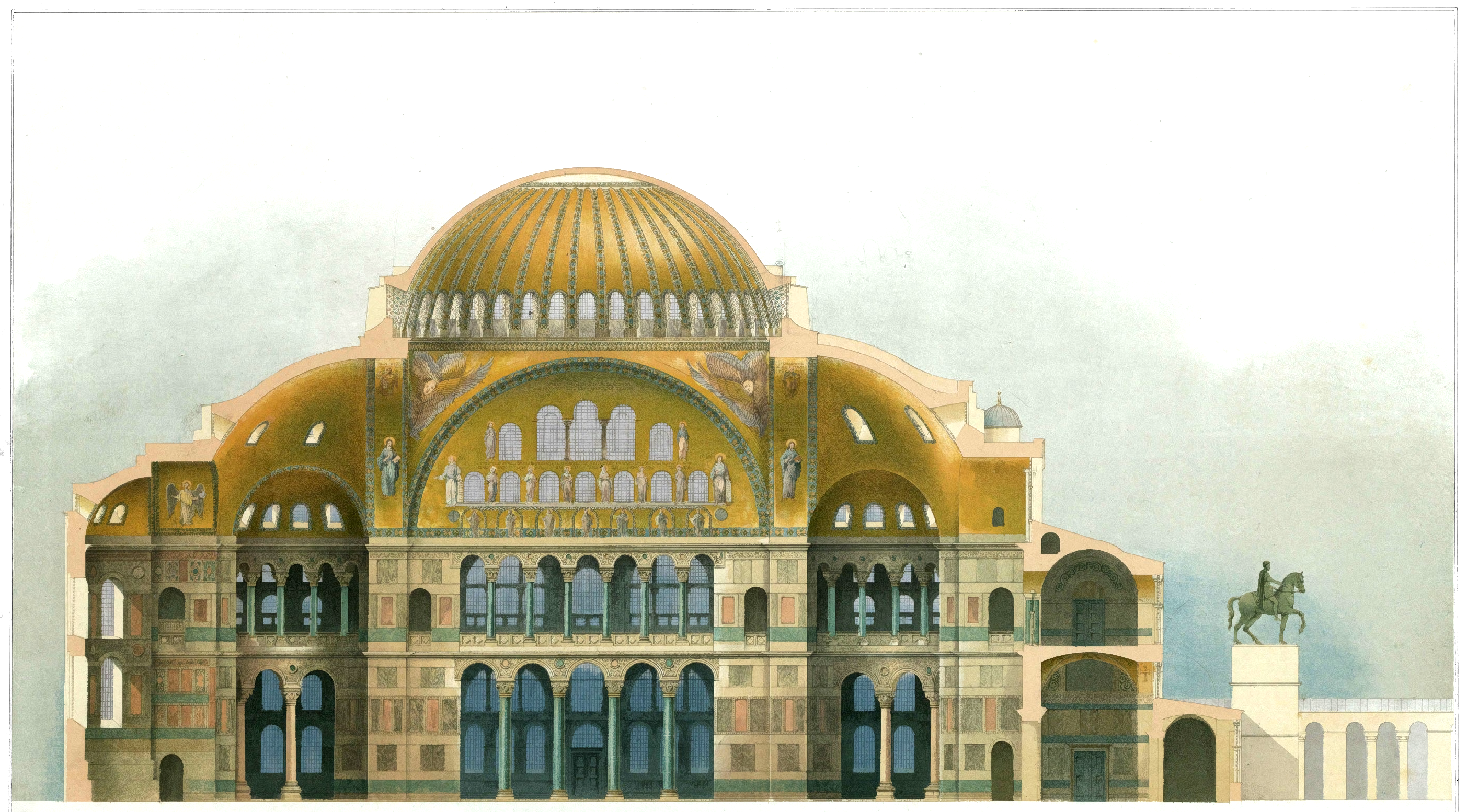
Reconstructed view of Byzantine Hagia Sophia, 6th–13th century

Agathias considered Paul's greatest work to be his long verse ekphrasis of Justinian's Cathedral of the Holy Wisdom (Hagia Sophia), composed after the reconstruction of the dome in 562 or 563. Paul sees the church as a "meadow" of many-coloured kinds of marble, and helps us to imagine the church before its many subsequent remodellings. The poem was probably commissioned by Justinian himself, with verses to be recited by Paul himself during the rededication ceremony. The panegyric consists of 1029 verses in Greek, starting with 134 lines of iambic trimeter, with the remainder in dactylic hexameter.

Of his other poems, some eighty epigrams in the classical tradition have been preserved in the Greek Anthology. Forty of these are love poems. Two are replies to poems by Agathias. In another Paul laments the death of Damocharis of Cos, Agathias's favourite pupil. J. A. Symonds calls these verses "the last autumnal blossoms on the tree of Greek beauty." Although his subject matter is varied, much is explicitly erotic and uses Pagan imagery, as in the following example:

I press her breasts, our mouths are joined, and I feed in unrestrained fury round her silver neck, but not yet is my conquest complete; I still toil wooing a maiden who refuses me her bed. Half of herself she has given to Aphrodite and half to Pallas, and I waste away between the two.
