= Zenodotus (Stoic) =

Ancient Greek philosopher and epigrammatist

Zenodotus (/zəˈnɒdətəs/; Greek: Ζηνόδοτος; fl. 150 BC) was a Stoic philosopher. He was a pupil of Diogenes of Babylon. He is mostly known from the short biography of him in Diogenes Laertius' Lives of the Philosophers.

An Athenian ephebic decree of 122/1 BC records that he gave lectures to the ephebes at the Ptolemaeum and the Lyceum throughout the year and honours the ephebes for their diligence in attending.

== Poetry ==
Diogenes Laërtius recorded the epitaph Zenodotus wrote for Zeno of Citium:

You made contentment the chief rule of life,

Despising haughty wealth, O God-like Zenon. With solemn look, and hoary brow serene, You taught a manly doctrine; and didst found By your deep wisdom, a great novel school, Chaste parent of unfearing liberty. And if your country was Phoenicia, Why need we grieve, from that land Cadmus came,

Who gave to Greece her written books of wisdom.

== Dedications ==
Chrysippus dedicated a two-book treatise on proverbs to a Zenodotus, who has been incorrectly identified with this Stoic: the correct identification is unknown.
