= Leonidas of Tarentum =

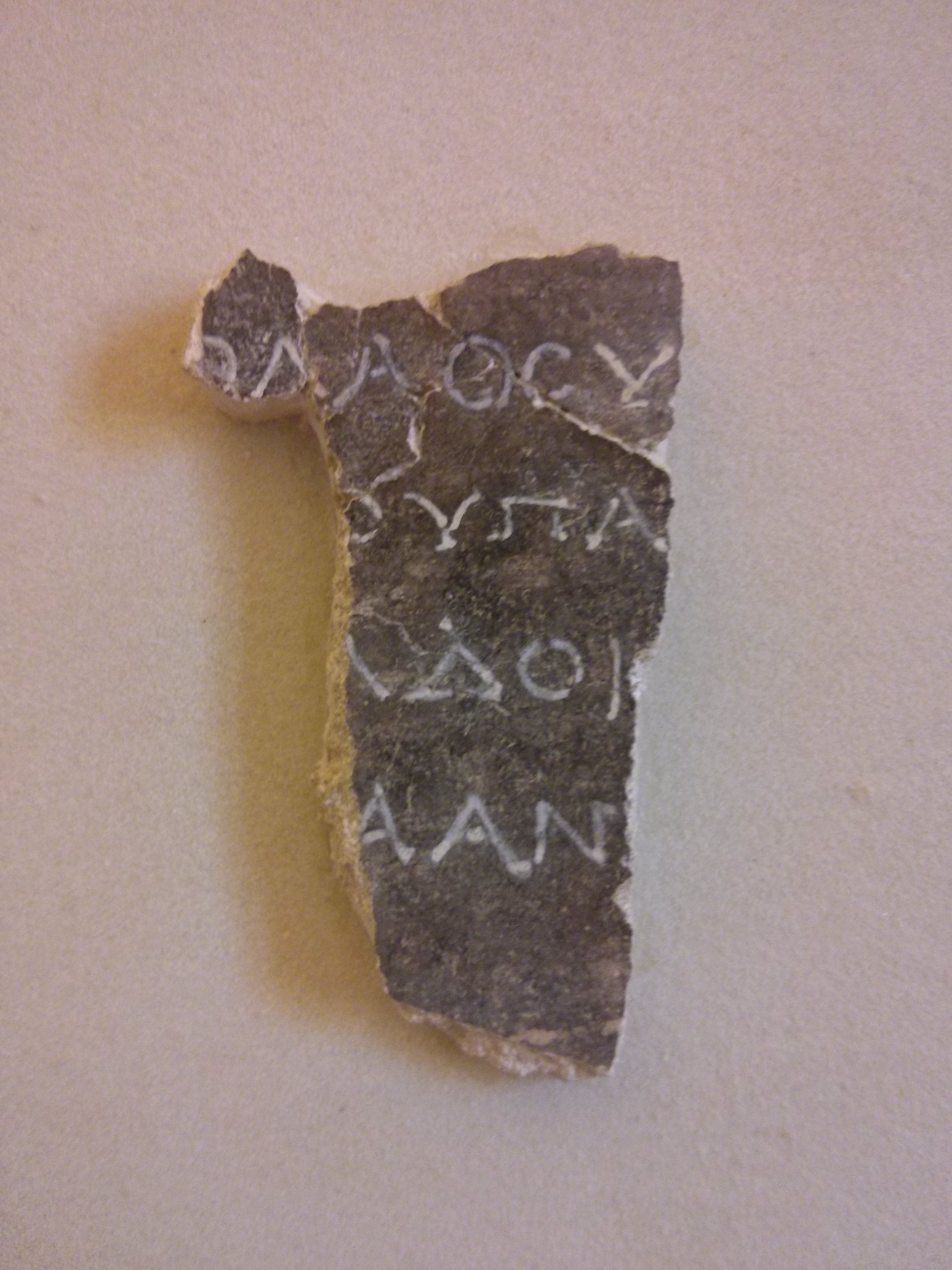
Fragment of an epigram attributed to Leonidas about deer-hunting, from a fresco in Suasa (now Castelleone di Suasa, Italy)

Leonidas of Tarentum (/liːˈɒnɪdəs/; Doric Greek: Λεωνίδας ὁ Ταραντῖνος) was an epigrammatist and lyric poet. He lived in Italy in the third century B.C. at Tarentum, on the coast of Apulia (Magna Graecia). Over a hundred of his epigrams are present in the Greek Anthology compiled in the 10th and 14th centuries. Most of his poems are dedicatory or sepulchral.

The youth of Leonidas coincided with the first awakening of the Greek cities on the south coast of Italy to the danger threatening them from Rome and their first attempts to seek protection from the warlike kings of Epirus. One of Leonidas's earliest extant poems chronicles a journey which he himself took to the court of Neoptolemus, son of Aeacides, seeking promise of protection. Soon after the poet's arrival, Neoptolemus was assassinated by his more warlike cousin, Pyrrhus, who eagerly agreed to become the Greeks' champion, and Leonidas returned to Italy to rally his countrymen for war.

Although he became quite famous after his death, Leonidas was only able to earn a bare subsistence from his poetry during his lifetime. In one grim poem, he addresses the mice that share his meal tub, reminding them that he needs only one lump of salt and two barley cakes for himself.

According to the translator Edwyn Bevan, "the thought of death pervades most of the poetry of Leonidas ... there does not seem to be for Leonidas any feeling of transcendental meaning to life ... Leonidas seems almost to find satisfaction in thinking that outside this little sunlit world of every day there is nothing but opaque blackness into which the figures of this world one by one disappear".

The poems of Leonidas of Tarentum were translated into English by Edwyn Bevan.

== Literary subjects ==
Lower-class characters were rare in ancient Greek poetry but popular in Hellenistic art, seen in Leonidas of Tarentum's work. Leonidas' epigrams focused on humble workers like fishermen, hunters, and weavers. He reshaped traditional representations of these professionals by creating a "community of workers." Unlike Homer, who mainly depicted craftsmen, Leonidas included various professions. Leonidas referenced Homer but adapted his portrayal to reflect Hellenistic society. Leonidas depicts a horizontal network of professionals, devoid of vertical structures like masters or orders. He emphasizes solidarity among professionals practicing the same craft, highlighting their collective identity and little groups of colleagues. Solidarity among professionals is particularly evident in funerary contexts, where it substitutes for traditional family bonds, as seen in the case of Theris, an aged fisherman, who is celebrated among his peers in death.

== English translations ==
- The Poems of Leonidas of Tarentum (1931) Introduced and Translated by Edwyn Bevan, Oxford: The Clarendon Press. (The only complete English translation of specifically Leonidas' works in one volume.)
