= Constantine Kephalas =

Byzantine scholar

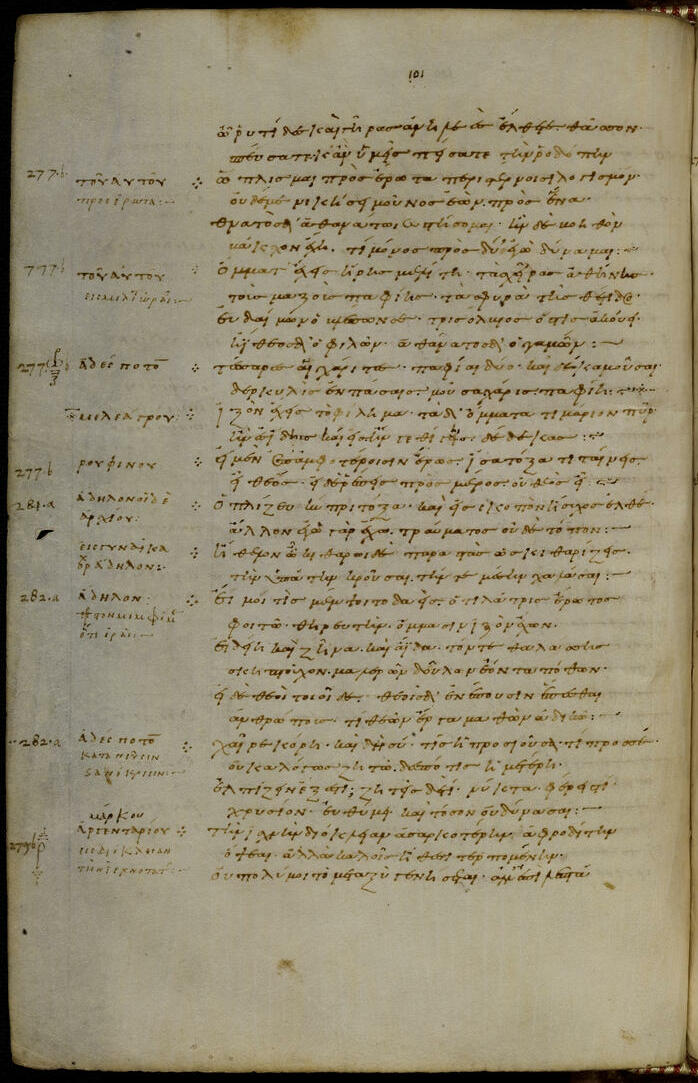
A page of the Palatine Anthology (Codex Palatinus 23), 10th century, from the Library of the University of Heidelberg

Constantine Kephalas (Greek: Κωνσταντῖνος Κεφαλᾶς) was a Byzantine scholar known as the compiler of the Greek Anthology. His life is almost entirely unknown, but he was active in the late 9th or 10th centuries, possibly as early as the 880s. His anthology, containing mostly ancient pagan poems with a sprinkling of Christian and 9th-century epigrams, was an immediate success, and was copied, in part or in whole, during the following decades. However, the 10th-century Palatine Anthology is considered to include an entire copy of Kephalas' work, augmented with other poems.

== Sources ==
- Spingou, Foteini (2019). "Byzantine Collections and Anthologies of Poetry". In Hörandner, Wolfram; Rhoby, Andreas; Zagklas, Nikos (eds.). A Companion to Byzantine Poetry. Leiden: Brill. pp. 381–403. ISBN 978-90-04-39288-5.
