= Admetus (epigrammatist) =

2nd-century Greek poet

Admetus (Gr. Αδμητος) was a Greek epigrammatist who lived in the early part of the 2nd century AD. One of his lines is preserved by Lucian.
