= Arabius Scholasticus =

Ancient Greek epigrammatist

Arabius Scholasticus (Ancient Greek: Ἀράβιος Σχολαστικὸς) was a writer of classical antiquity who was the author of seven epigrams in the Greek Anthology, most of which are upon works of art. He lived probably in the reign of Justinian.
