= Erycius of Cyzicus =

Ancient Greek lyric poet (c. 630–c. 570 BC)

Erycius of Cyzicus was an Ancient Greek poet.

== Life ==
He flourished in about the middle of the first century B.C.

== Works ==
One of his epigrams is on an Athenian woman who had in early life been captured at the sack of Athens by Sulla B.C. 80. Another is against a grammarian Parthenius of Phocaea.

== Sources ==
John William Mackail's book Select epigrams from the Greek anthology provides the following information about Erycius of Cyzicus:

ERYCIUS of Cyzicus flourished about the middle of the first century B.C. One of his epigrams is on an Athenian woman who had in early life been captured at the sack of Athens by Sulla B.C. 80; another is against a grammarian Parthenius of Phocaea, possibly the same who was the master of Virgil. Of the fourteen epigrams in the Anthology under the name of Erycius one is headed "Erycius the Macedonian" and may be by a different author

== See also ==
- Ancient Greek literature
- Sapphic stanza
- Papyrus Oxyrhynchus 7 – papyrus preserving Sappho fr. 5
- Papyrus Oxyrhynchus 1231 – papyrus preserving Sappho fr. 15–30
- Lesbian poetry
