= Christian Friedrich Wilhelm Jacobs =

German classical scholar (1764–1847)

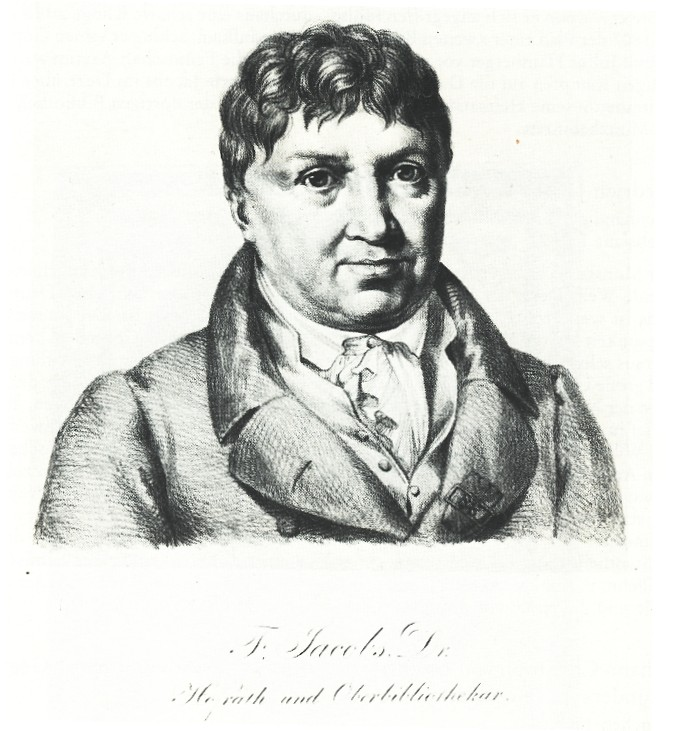
Christian Friedrich Wilhelm Jacobs.

Christian Friedrich Wilhelm Jacobs (October 6, 1764 – March 30, 1847) a German classical scholar, was born at Gotha. After studying philology and theology at Jena and Göttingen, in 1785, Friedrich Jacobs (as he is known), became a teacher in the gymnasium of his native town, and in 1802 was appointed to an office in the public library. In 1807 he became classical tutor in the lyceum of Munich, but, disgusted at the attacks made upon him by the old Bavarian Catholic party, who resented the introduction of north German teachers, he returned to Gotha in 1810 to take charge of the library and the numismatic cabinet. He remained in Gotha till his death on 30 March 1847.

Jacobs was an extremely successful teacher; he took great interest in the affairs of his country, and was a publicist of no mean order. But his great work was a huge critical commentary to the Greek Anthology in 13 volumes (1798–1814), followed by the first modern edition based on the Codex Palatinus (1814–1817). He published also notes on Stobaeus, Euripides, Athenaeus and the Iliaca of John Tzetzes; translations of Aelian (History of Animals); many of the Greek romances (Philostratus); poetical versions of much of the Greek Anthology; miscellaneous essays on classical subjects; and some very successful school books. His translation of the political speeches of Demosthenes was undertaken with the express purpose of rousing his country against Napoleon, whom he regarded as a second Philip of Macedon.

In 1809 he became correspondent of the Royal Institute of the Netherlands. Four years later, in 1813, he became associated member.

Friedrich Jacobs was the great-great-great-grandfather of the philosopher Ruth Anna Putnam (wife of Hilary Putnam).
