= William Roger Paton =

Scottish classical scholar and epigraphist (1857–1921)

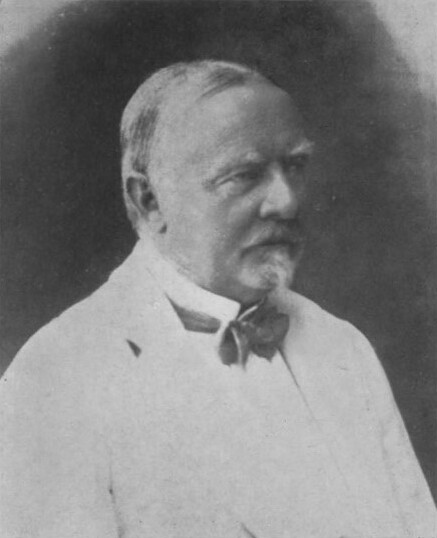
- Born: 9 February 1857; Old Machar, Aberdeen, Scotland
- Died: 21 April 1921 (aged 64); Vathy, Samos, Greece
- Education: Oxford University
- Known for: Translating the Greek Anthology

Signature
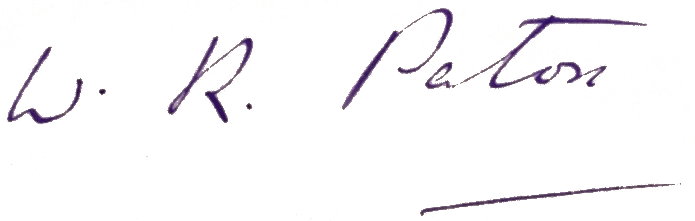

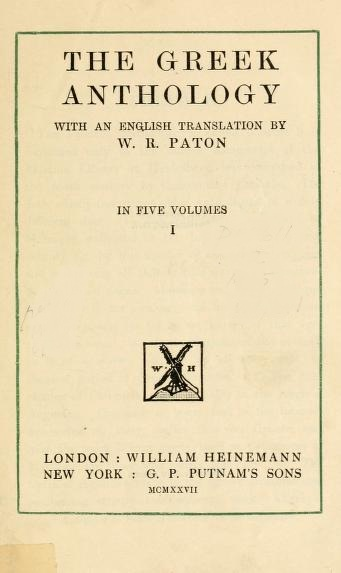
Title page of the first volume of Paton's prose translation of the Greek Anthology, 1927

William Roger Paton, usually cited as W. R. Paton (9 February 1857 – 21 April 1921), was a Scottish author and translator of ancient Greek texts, mostly known for his translation of the Greek Anthology.

== Early life and family ==
William Roger Paton was born at Old Machar, Aberdeen, Scotland, son of John Paton (1818 – 1879) and Eliza Deborah Burnett (died 1860).

His father, John Paton (Esq., of Ferrachie and Grandholme or Grandhome) was educated at Eton College. He was in the military, initially in the Aberdeenshire militia as major and later colonel and deputy lieutenant of Aberdeenshire, and was also a magistrate. His mother Eliza Deborah Burnett was the daughter of Thomas Burnett of Kepplestone, also from Aberdeenshire. They married on 11 June 1844, and they had five children: four daughters (Mary-Louisa, Ida-Margaret-Helen, Sarah-Matilda and Elisabeth-Bertha) and one son (the fourth child), William Roger, born at 10 Chanonry, Old Aberdeen, on 9 February 1857. His mother died three years later on 24 February 1860 at the age of 37. In 1862, his father married Catherine Margaret, daughter of Colonel Lumsden.

== Education ==
He was educated at the same school as his father, Eton College, Windsor, where he studied from 1871 to 1873, boarding at Edward Peake Rouse's house and later on at Oscar Browning's. On 23 October 1876, at the age of 19 he became a student at University College, Oxford, where he took a first in Classical Moderations in 1877. The following year, he changed direction, starting legal studies for the bar at Middle Temple, London. Later on he returned to Oxford and obtained a third in Classics Literae Humaniores in 1880. Even though he was not called to the bar, he continued to be involved with Middle Temple until 1884.

Later on, in 1900, the University of Halle awarded Paton an honorary PhD.

== Marriage and life in the South ==
He was married in 1885 to Irene Olympitis (1869/70 – 1908, Paris, daughter of Emmanuel Olympitis, mayor of Kalymnos), a woman from the island of Kalymnos who had a plot of land in Myndos (Gümüşlük) but he later moved to Chios and Lesbos so that his sons could attend high school there.

He had two sons and two daughters: George Paton (13 August 1886 – ?), unmarried, Thetis Paton (21 November 1887, Woodside – ?), who married Costakis Svinos in Smyrna, John David Paton, (1890 – 1922), who married Fenella Crombie from Scotland, and Sevastie or Augusta Paton (1900, Myndos – 1989), who married Baron János Kemény, Hungarian author, theater director and dramatist.

He appears as a resident of Vathy, Samos from 1897 to his death, 1921, from a number of periodicals which show this address and some of his published letters. He was a resident in Samos since his second marriage, to Clio, a woman from Samos, after the death of his first wife.

He died on 21 April 1921 in the town of Vathy, Samos.

== Timeline ==
- 1857 birth at Old Machar, Aderbdeen
- 1871–1873 (aged 14–16) Oxford for studies
- 1885 (aged 28) married Irene Olympitis
- 1886 (aged 29) birth of his son George
- 1887 (aged 30) birth of his daughter Thetis, Woodside, Aberdeen
- 1890 (aged 33) birth of his son David
- 1890 signs letter from Aberdeen
- 1897 (aged 40) Vathy, Samos
- 1900 (aged 43) birth of his daughter Sevastie or Augusta, Myndos
- Chios/Lesvos for high school for his sons
- 1921 (aged 64) died at Vathy Samos

== Works ==
He published the following books:

- The inscriptions of Cos (with E.L. Hicks), Oxford, Clarendon Press, 1891 in
- Plutarchi Pythici Dialogoi tres , , 1893
- Anthologiae Grecae Erotica, London, David Nutt, 1898,
- Inscriptiones insularum maris Aegaei praeter Delum, 2. Inscriptiones Lesbi, Nesi, Tenedi, Berlin 1899
- The Greek anthology with an English translation, The Loeb Classical Library
  - The Greek anthology with an English translation, vol. I by W. R. Paton, published by W. Heinemann (London), G.P. Putnam's sons (New York) 1916 (edition 1927) see also (contains books I–VI of the Greek Anthology). Also available in και
  - The Greek anthology with an English translation, vol. II by W. R. Paton, Published by W. Heinemann (London), G.P. Putnam's sons (New York) 1917 (edition 1919) also see (contains books VII–VIII of the Greek Anthology)
  - The Greek anthology with an English translation, vol. III by W. R. Paton, Published by W. Heinemann (London), G.P. Putnam's sons (New York) 1915 (edition 1925) see also (contains book IX of the Greek Anthology)
  - The Greek anthology with an English translation, vol. IV by W. R. Paton, Published by W. Heinemann (London), G.P. Putnam's sons (New York) 1918. see also (contains books X–XII of the Greek Anthology)
  - The Greek anthology with an English translation, vol. V by W. R. Paton, Published by W. Heinemann (London), G.P. Putnam's sons (New York) 1918 also see (contains books XIII–XVI of the Greek Anthology)
- Histories of Polybius, Loeb Classical Library, "Polybius, The Histories", six volumes: Greek text with English translation by W. R. Paton
  - I (L128) Books I–II (1922) ISBN 0-674-99142-7
  - II (L137) Books III–IV (1922) ISBN 0-674-99152-4
  - III (L138) Books V–VIII (1923) ISBN 0-674-99153-2
  - IV (L159) Books IX–XV (1925) ISBN 0-674-99175-3
  - V (L160) Books XVI–XXVII (1926) ISBN 0-674-99176-1
  - VI (L161) Books XXVIII–XXXIX (1927) ISBN 0-674-99178-8
- Plutarchi Moralia (translation), with other authors, in aedibus B. G. Teubneri, 1925

His works are extensively quoted as the main references both for the Greek Anthology as well as for Polybius.
