= Palatine Anthology =

Collection of Greek poems

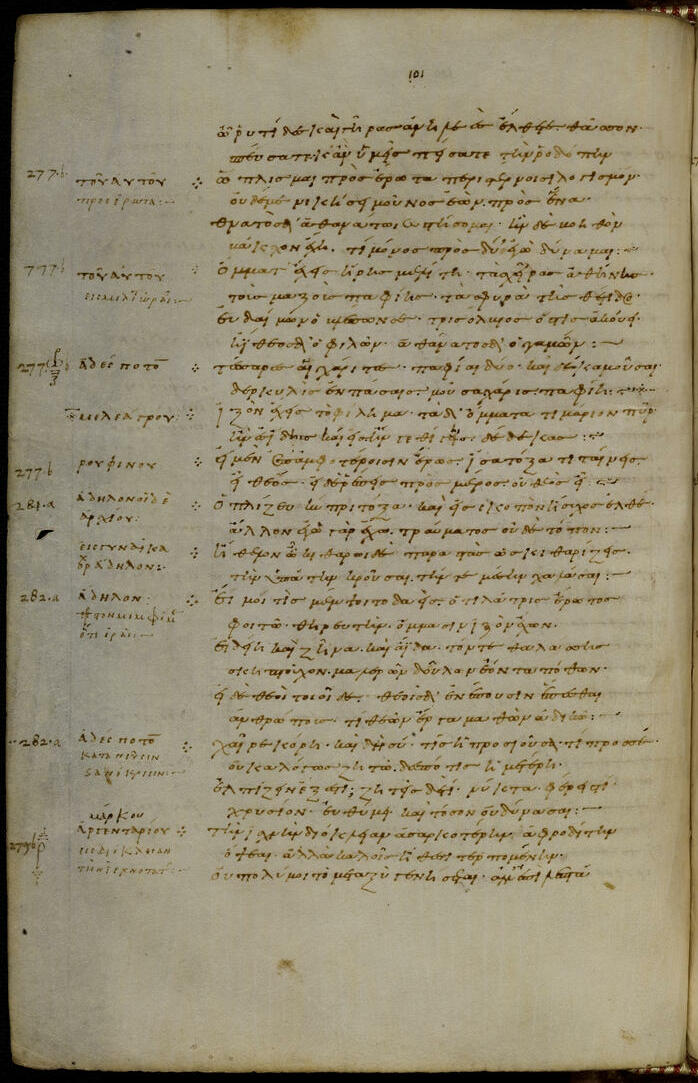
A page of the Palatine Anthology (Codex Palatinus 23), 10th century, from the Library of the University of Heidelberg

The Palatine Anthology (or Anthologia Palatina), sometimes abbreviated AP, is a manuscript collection of Greek poems and epigrams discovered in 1606 in the Palatine Library in Heidelberg. It is based on the lost collection of Constantine Kephalas of the 10th century, which in turn is based on older anthologies. It contains material from the 7th century BC until 600 AD and later on was the main part of the Greek Anthology which also included the Anthology of Planudes and more material.

The manuscript of the Palatine Anthology was discovered by Saumaise (Salmasius) in 1606 in the Palatine library at Heidelberg (Codex Palatinus 23). In 1623, during the Thirty Years' War, it was sent with the rest of the Palatine Library to Rome as a present from Maximilian I of Bavaria to Pope Gregory XV and it was kept in the Vatican Library. In 1797 it was taken to Paris by order of the French Directory and in 1816 it was returned to Heidelberg when the war ended, but one (smaller) part of it remained in Paris (Parisinus Suppl. Gr. 384).

== The manuscript ==
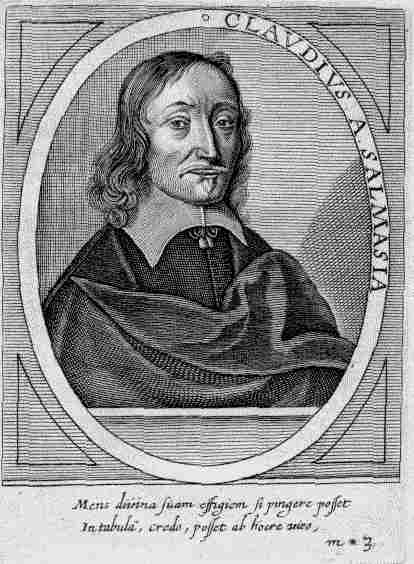
Claudius Salmasius (Claude de Saumaise), 1588–1653

The manuscript of the Palatine Anthology consists of 709 pages. The section of the manuscript which is kept today at the Library of the University of Heidelberg (MS Pal. gr. 23) consists of pages 1–614, and the other part, housed in the Bibliothèque nationale de France, (Par. Suppl. gr. 384) comprises the remaining 94 pages (pp. 615–709).

It was written by four scribes around 980. One of the scribes made comments and additions and part of the manuscript was corrected by a Corrector.

The scribes were the following:

- scribe Α: pages 4–9.384.8
- scribe J: pages 9.348.9-9.563 (possibly Constantine the Rhodian)
- scribe Β: pages 9.564-11.66.3
- scribe Β2: pages 11.66.4-11.118.1
- scribe Β: pages 11.118.1-13.31

Scribe J made corrections to the text written by scribe A and at the end, a Corrector, C, made many corrections to the text of Α and J.

== See also ==
- List of anthologies of Greek epigrams
