= Philippus of Thessalonica =

Ancient Greek epigrammatist

Philippus of Thessalonica (Greek: Φίλιππος ὁ Θεσσαλονικεύς) (1st century) or Philippus Epigrammaticus was the compiler of an Anthology of Epigrammatists subsequent to Meleager of Gadara and is himself the author of 72 epigrams in the Greek Anthology. Philippus has one word which describes the epigram by a single quality; he calls his work an oligostikhia or collection of poems not exceeding a few lines in length. Philippus' own epigrams, of which over seventy are extant, are generally rather dull, chiefly school exercises, and, in the phrase of Jacobs, imitatione magis quam inventione conspicua (more like imitation than striking innovation). However, he was responsible for the preservation of a large mass of work belonging to the Roman period.

His collection of epigrams is referred to as the Garland of Philip, in imitation of the Garland of Meleager, who lived in the first century BC and had collected epigrams from the Classical and Hellenistic period.
