= Anthology of Planudes =

Anthology of Greek epigrams and poems

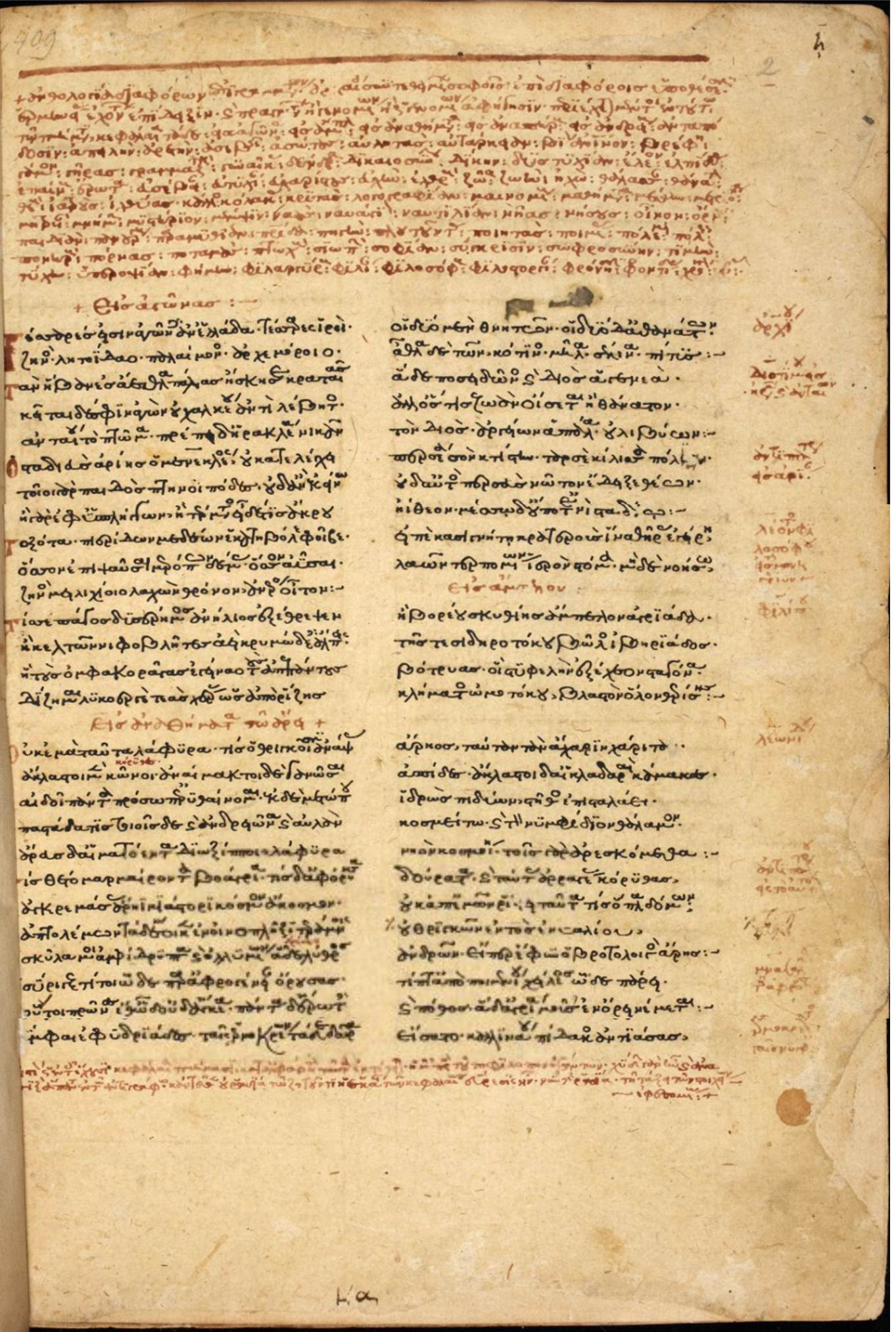
The Anthology of Planudes, c. 1300

The Anthology of Planudes (also called Planudean Anthology, in Latin Anthologia Planudea or sometimes in Greek Ἀνθολογία διαφόρων ἐπιγραμμάτων ("Anthology of various epigrams"), from the first line of the manuscript), is an anthology of Greek epigrams and poems compiled by Maximus Planudes (c. 1260 – c. 1305), a Byzantine grammarian and theologian, based on the 10th century Anthology of Cephalas. It comprises 2,400 epigrams.

The Anthology of Planudes starts with the text: «Ἀνθολογία διαφόρων ἐπιγραμμάτων, συντεθειμένων σοφοίς, ἐπί διαφόροις ὑποθέσεσιν ...» (Anthology of various epigrams, created by wise people, about different subjects ...) and consists of seven books.

It can be found in an autograph copy of Planudes in Biblioteca Marciana (codex Marcianus gr. Z. 481) in Venice but also in two handwritten copies, one in an incomplete edition (in London, British Library Add MS 16409) and the other in the final edition of the anthology (which is only in fragmentary form, in Paris, Paris B.N. gr. 2744), as well as in several printed editions.

Several printed copies of the Planudean Anthology were made, as it was the only known anthology of Greek epigrams and poems until 1606, when the Palatine Anthology manuscript was found.

The anthology is today part of the corpus of texts known today as the Greek Anthology. The 397 epigrams not found in the Palatine Anthology (also mentioned as 395 and often as 388) are usually included in the Greek Anthology as the Appendix Planudea.

== Content ==
Even though the Anthology of Planudes is based in the Anthology of Cephalas, comparison with the Palatine Anthology (also based on Cephalas's anthology) shows that not only many poems and epigrams were omitted (Palatine has 3700 epigrams, while the Planudean only 2400), but also Planudes made several mistakes or "corrections". At the beginning the transcription was done accurately, but after a certain point omissions become more and more as if the author lost his interest or was pressed to finalise the books. As a result, when the much more accurate Palatine Anthology was discovered, the interest of researchers was shifted from the Planudean to the Palatine. The only important element of the Planudean collection is the 388 epigrams not found in the Palatine, which are considered to have been part of the Anthology of Cephalas, but for an unknown reason were not transcribed in the Palatine Anthology.

== Editions and text of Planudean Anthology ==
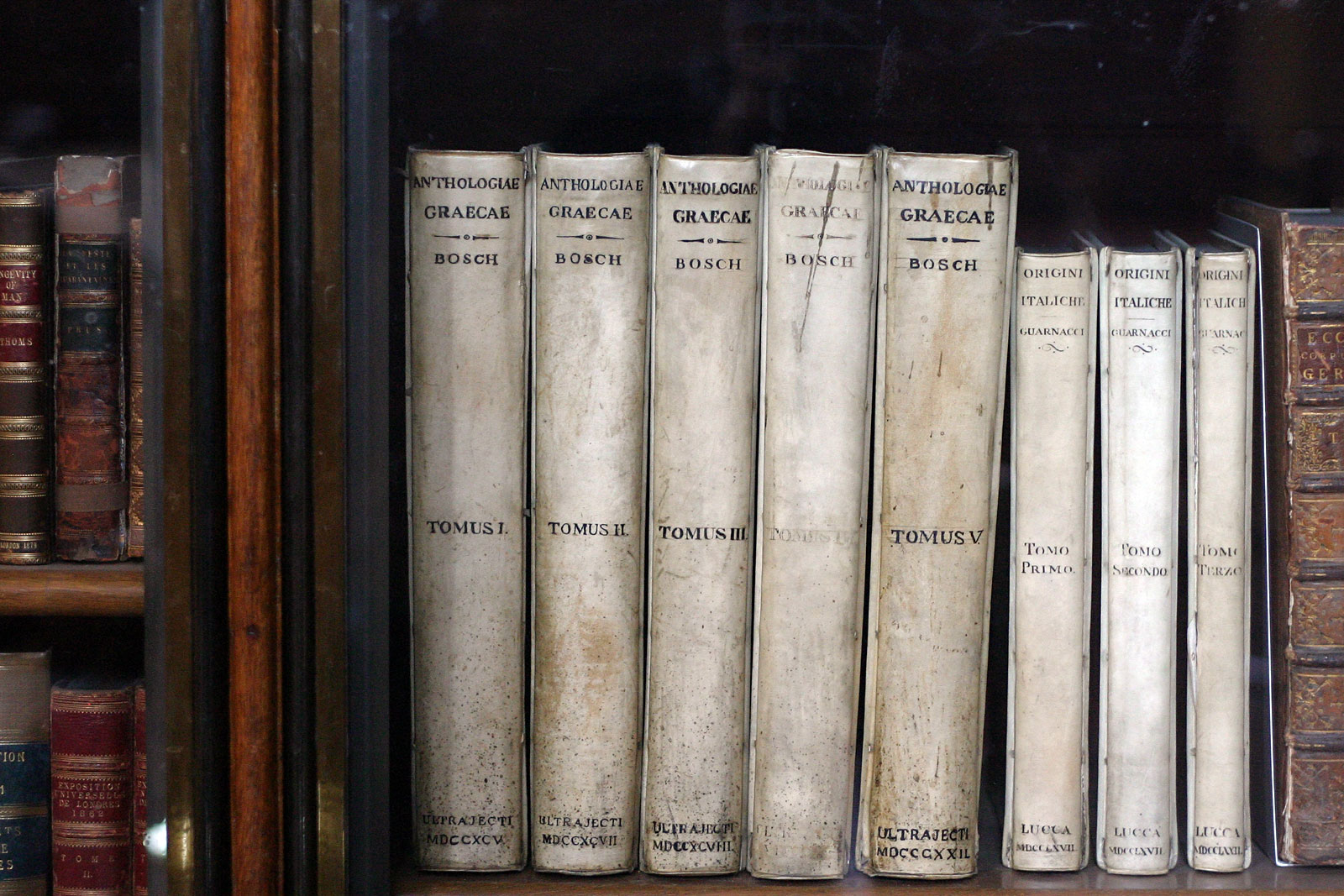
The van Bosch and van Lennep version of The Greek Anthology (in five vols., begun by Bosch in 1795, finished and published by Lennep in 1822). Photographed at The British Museum, London. Contains the metrical Latin version of Grotius's Planuedean (Planudes) version of the Anthology. Heavily illustrated. It also reprints the very error-prone Greek text of the Wechelian edition (1600) of the Anthology, which is itself simply a reprint of the 1566 Planudean edition by Henricus Stephanus.

The first printed edition of the Anthology of Planudes (editio princeps) was printed by Janus Lascaris in 1494 in Florence under the title «Anthologia Graeca». It was also printed later on by Aldus Manutius (Venice 1503, 1521, 1551), Badius Ascensius (Paris 1531), P. and J.-M. Nicolini (Venice 1550), Jean Brodeau (Basel 1549), Henricus Stephanus (Paris 1566).

The edition of Bosch was printed between 1795 and 1822 in Utrecht in five volumes with a Latin translation by Hugo Grotius entitled «Anthologia Graeca cum versione Latina Hugonis Grotii». Apart from the text of the Planudean Anthology, this edition also included other texts after the first half of the third book.

- Anthologia Graeca cum versione Latina Hugonis Grotii, Volume 1, Claude Saumaise, Ultrajecti e Τypographia B. Wild & J. Altheer, 1795 Volume 1 and beginning of the text of the Planudean Anthology, Books 1-2
- Anthologia Graeca cum versione Latina Hugonis Grotii editae Ab Hieronymo de Bosch, Volume 2, Jeronimo de Bosch, Hugo Grotius, Ultrajecti e typographia Wild & Altheer, 1797 Volume 2 and text of the Planudean Anthology - Books 3-4
- Anthologia Graeca cum versione Latina Hugonis Grotii editae Ab Hieronymo de Bosch, Volume 3, Ultrajecti e typographia B. Wild & J. Altheer, 1798 Volume 3 and text of the Planudean Anthology - Books 5-7 and Mantissa Vetus, page 288, Mantissa secunda de Graecis heriobus adjecta ab Henrico Stephano, page 399, until 4th and then texts of Theokritus (Eidyllia) until page 469.
- Observationes et notae in Anthologiam Graecam quibus accetum Cl. Salmasii, Notae ineditae, Volume 4, Hieronymi de Bosch, David Jacob van Lennep, Claude Saumaise, Ultrajecti e typographia B. Wild & J. Altheer, 1810, Volume 4 and contents
- Hieronymi de Bosch Observationum et Notarum in Anthologiam Graecam volumen alterum quod indices continet, opus Boschii morte interruptum David Jacobus van Lennep aboluit, Ultrajecti e typographia J. Altheer, 1822, Volume 5

== See also ==
- List of anthologies of Greek epigrams
