= Richard François Philippe Brunck =

18th-century French scholar

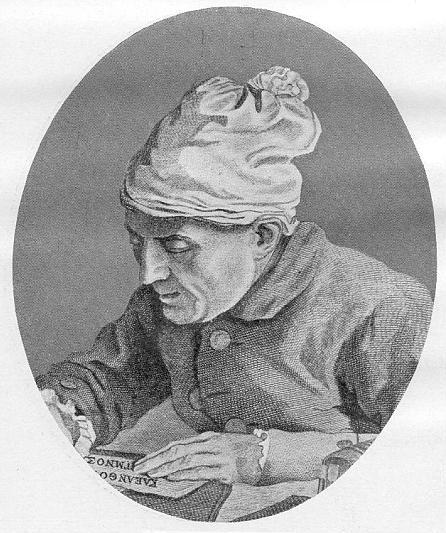
Richard François Philippe Brunck, engraving by P. Jean-Baptiste Bradel.

Richard François Philippe Brunck (30 December 1729 – 12 June 1803) was a French classical scholar.

== Biography ==
Brunck was born in Strasbourg, France, educated at the Jesuits' College in Paris, and took part in the Seven Years' War as military commissary. At the age of thirty he returned to Strasbourg to resume his studies, especially Greek. He spent considerable sums of money in publishing editions of the Greek classics.

The first work he edited was the Anthologia Graeca or Analecta veterum Poetarum Graecorum (1772–1776), in which his innovations on the established mode of criticism startled European scholars. As an editor, he made no commentaries, but occupied himself only with the text. Persuaded that all faults in the language of the Greek poets came from the carelessness of copyists, wherever it seemed to him that an obscure or difficult passage might be made intelligible and easy by a change of text, he did not scruple to make the necessary alterations, whether the new reading were supported by manuscript authority or not.

He became a member of the Académie des Inscriptions et Belles-Lettres in 1777.

== Other editions ==
Other works by him are editions of Anacreon (1778), several plays of the Greek tragedians, Apollonius Rhodius (1780), Aristophanes, with an excellent Latin translation (1781–1783), Gnomici poetae Graeci (1784), Sophocles (1786), with Latin translation, a work for which he received a pension of 2,000 francs from the king. He also published editions of Virgil (1785), Plautus (1788) and Terence (1797).

== French Revolution ==
At the outbreak of the French Revolution, in which he took an active part, Brunck was imprisoned at Besançon, and lost his pension, being reduced to such extremes of penury that he was obliged to sell a portion of his library. In 1802 his pension was restored to him, but it came too late to prevent the sale of his remaining books.
