= Epigram =

Brief memorable statement

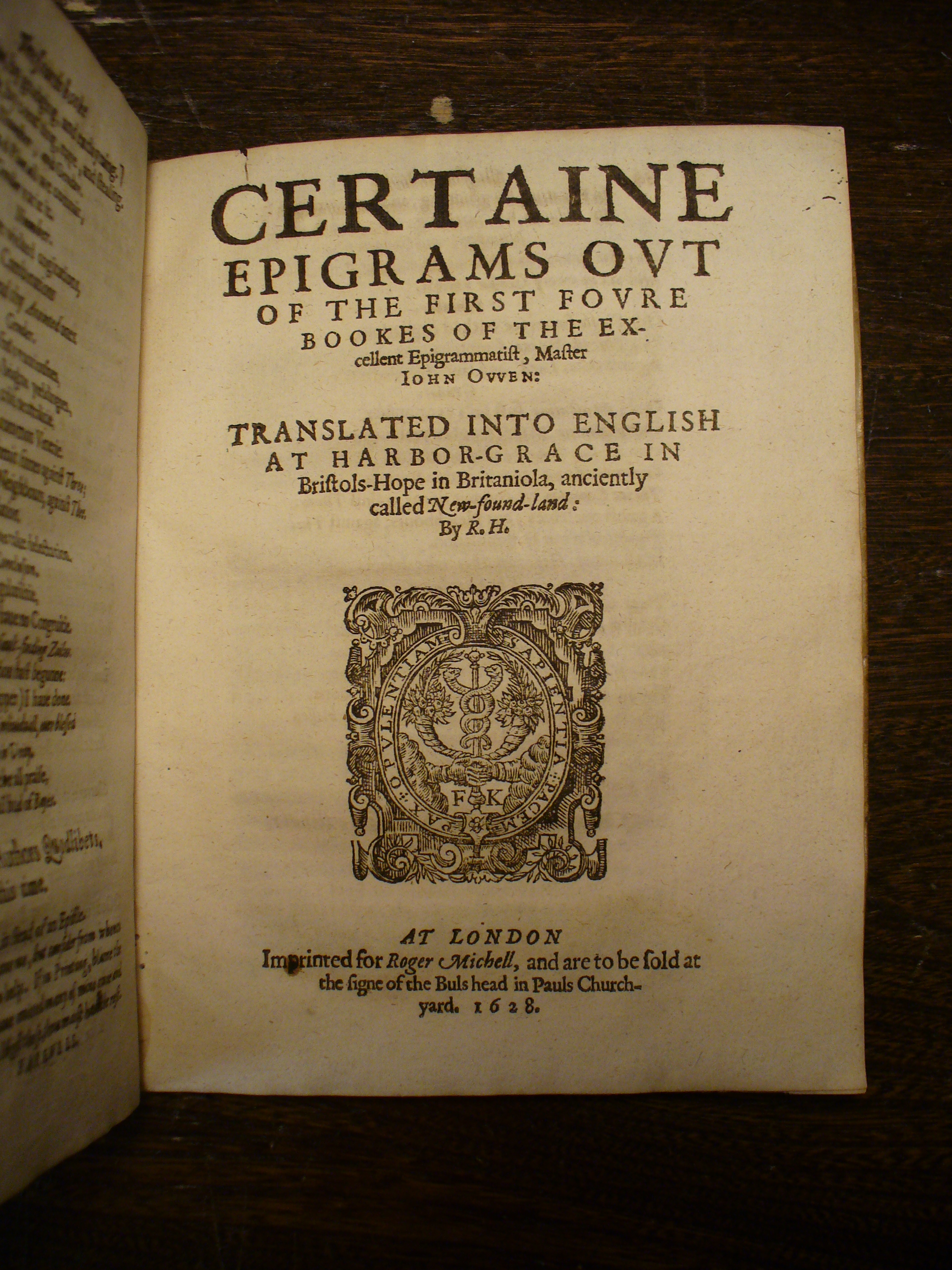
Robert Hayman's 1628 book Quodlibets devotes much of its text to epigrams.

An epigram is a brief, interesting, memorable, sometimes surprising or humorous satirical statement. The word derives from the Greek ἐπίγραμμα (epígramma, "inscription", from ἐπιγράφειν [epigráphein], "to write on, to inscribe"). This literary device has been practiced for over two millennia.

The presence of wit or sarcasm tends to distinguish non-poetic epigrams from aphorisms and adages, which typically do not show those qualities.

== Ancient Greek ==
The Greek tradition of epigrams began as poems inscribed on votive offerings at sanctuaries – including statues of athletes – and on funerary monuments, for example "Go tell it to the Spartans, passersby...". These original epigrams did the same job as a short prose text might have done, but in verse. Epigram became a literary genre in the Hellenistic period, probably developing out of scholarly collections of inscriptional epigrams.

Though modern epigrams are usually thought of as very short, Greek literary epigram was not always as short as later examples, and the divide between "epigram" and "elegy" is sometimes indistinct (they share a characteristic metre, elegiac couplets). In the classical period, the clear distinction between them was that epigrams were inscribed and meant to be read, while elegies were recited and meant to be heard. Some elegies could be quite short, but only public epigrams were longer than ten lines. All the same, the origin of epigram in inscription exerted a residual pressure to keep things concise, even when they were recited in Hellenistic times. Many of the characteristic types of literary epigram look back to inscriptional contexts, particularly funerary epigram, which in the Hellenistic era becomes a literary exercise. Many "sympotic" epigrams combine sympotic and funerary elements – they tell their readers (or listeners) to drink and live for today because life is short. Generally, any theme found in classical elegies could be and were adapted for later literary epigrams.

Hellenistic epigrams are also thought of as having a "point" – that is, the poem ends in a punchline or satirical twist. By no means do all Greek epigrams behave this way; many are simply descriptive, but Meleager of Gadara and Philippus of Thessalonica, the first comprehensive anthologists, preferred the short and witty epigram. Since their collections helped form knowledge of the genre in Rome and then later throughout Europe, Epigram came to be associated with 'point', especially because the European epigram tradition takes the Latin poet Martial as its principal model; he copied and adapted Greek models (particularly the contemporary poets Lucillius and Nicarchus) selectively and in the process redefined the genre, aligning it with the indigenous Roman tradition of "satura", hexameter satire, as practised by (among others) his contemporary Juvenal. Greek epigram was actually much more diverse, as the Milan Papyrus now indicates.

A major source for Greek literary epigram is the Greek Anthology, a compilation from the 10th century AD based on older collections, including those of Meleager and Philippus. It contains epigrams ranging from the Hellenistic period through the Imperial period and Late Antiquity into the compiler's own Byzantine era – a thousand years of short elegiac texts on a wide variety of topics. The Anthology includes one book of Christian epigrams as well as one book of erotic and amorous homosexual epigrams called the Μοῦσα Παιδικἠ (Mousa Paidike, "The Boyish Muse").

== Ancient Roman ==
Roman epigrams owe much to their Greek predecessors and contemporaries. Roman epigrams, however, were often more satirical than Greek ones, and at times used obscene language for effect. Latin epigrams could be composed as inscriptions or graffiti, such as this one from Pompeii, which exists in several versions and seems from its inexact meter to have been composed by a less educated person. Its content makes it clear how popular such poems were:

Admiror, O paries, te non cecidisse ruinis
qui tot scriptorum taedia sustineas.

I'm astonished, wall, that you haven't collapsed into ruins,
since you're holding up the weary verse of so many poets.

However, in the literary world, epigrams were most often gifts to patrons or entertaining verse to be published, not inscriptions. Many Roman writers seem to have composed epigrams, including Domitius Marsus, whose collection Cicuta (now lost) was named after the poisonous plant Cicuta for its biting wit, and Lucan, more famous for his epic Pharsalia. Authors whose epigrams survive include Catullus, who wrote both invectives and love epigrams – his poem 85 is one of the latter.

Odi et amo. Quare id faciam fortasse requiris.
Nescio, sed fieri sentio, et excrucior.

I hate and I love. Maybe you'd like to know why I do?
I don't know, but I feel it happening, and I am tormented.

Martial, however, is considered to be the master of the Latin epigram. His technique relied heavily on the satirical poem with a joke in the last line, thus drawing him closer to the modern idea of epigram as a genre. Here he defines his genre against a (probably fictional) critic (in the latter half of 2.77):

Disce quod ignoras: Marsi doctique Pedonis
saepe duplex unum pagina tractat opus.
Non sunt longa quibus nihil est quod demere possis,
sed tu, Cosconi, disticha longa facis.

Learn what you don't know: one work of (Domitius) Marsus or learned Pedo
often stretches out over a doublesided page.
A work isn't long if you can't take anything out of it,
but you, Cosconius, write even a couplet too long.

Poets known for their epigrams whose work has been lost include Cornificia.

== English ==
In early English literature the short couplet poem was dominated by the poetic epigram and proverb, especially in the translations of the Bible and the Greek and Roman poets.

Two successive lines of verse that rhyme with each other are known as a couplet. Since 1600, the couplet has been featured as a part of the longer sonnet form, most notably in William Shakespeare's sonnets. Sonnet 76 is an example. The two-line poetic form as a closed couplet was also used by William Blake in his poem "Auguries of Innocence", and also by Byron in his poem Don Juan, by John Gay in his fables, and by Alexander Pope in his An Essay on Man.

The first work of English literature penned in North America was Robert Hayman's Quodlibets, Lately Come Over from New Britaniola, Old Newfoundland, which is a collection of over 300 epigrams, many of which do not conform to the two-line rule or trend. While the collection was written between 1618–1628 in what is now Harbour Grace, Newfoundland, it was published shortly after his return to Britain.

In Victorian times, the epigram couplet was often used by the prolific American poet Emily Dickinson. Her poem No. 1534 is a typical example of her eleven poetic epigrams. The novelist George Eliot also included couplets throughout her writings. Her best example is in her sequenced sonnet poem entitled "Brother and Sister" in which each of the eleven sequenced sonnets ends with a couplet. In her sonnets, the preceding lead-in-line, to the couplet ending of each, could be thought of as a title for the couplet, as is shown in Sonnet VIII of the sequence.

During the early 20th century, the rhymed epigram couplet form developed into a fixed verse image form, with an integral title as the third line. Adelaide Crapsey codified the couplet form into a two-line rhymed verse of ten syllables per line with her image couplet poem On Seeing Weather-Beaten Trees, first published in 1915.

By the 1930s, the five-line cinquain verse form became widely known in the poetry of the Scottish poet William Soutar. These were originally labelled epigrams but later identified as image cinquains in the style of Adelaide Crapsey.

J. V. Cunningham was also a noted writer of epigrams (a medium suited to a "short-breathed" person).

== Poetic epigrams ==
What is an epigram? a dwarfish whole,
Its body brevity, and wit its soul.

— Samuel Taylor Coleridge, "Epigram" (1809)

Some can gaze and not be sick
But I could never learn the trick.
There's this to say for blood and breath;
They give a man a taste for death.

— A. E. Housman

Little strokes
Fell great oaks.

— Benjamin Franklin

I am His Highness' dog at Kew;
Pray tell me, sir, whose dog are you?

— Alexander Pope

I'm tired of Love: I'm still more tired of Rhyme.
But Money gives me pleasure all the time.

— Hilaire Belloc

I hope for nothing. I fear nothing. I am free.

— Nikos Kazantzakis

To define the beautiful is to misunderstand it.

— Charles Robert Anon (Fernando Pessoa)

This Humanist whom no belief constrained
Grew so broad-minded he was scatter-brained.

— J. V. Cunningham

All things pass
Love and mankind is grass.

— Stevie Smith

Here lies my wife: here let her lie!
Now she's at rest – and so am I.

— John Dryden

Epigram about John Milton (many poets commented on Milton, including Dryden):

Three Poets, in three distant Ages born,
Greece, Italy, and England did adorn.
The First in loftiness of thought surpassed;
The Next in Majesty; in both the Last.
The force of Nature could no farther go:
To make a third she joined the former two.

— John Dryden, "Epigram on Milton" (1688)

Epigram about Charles II of England:

We have a pretty witty king,
Whose word no man relies on.
He never said a foolish thing,
And never did a wise one.

— John Wilmot, 2nd Earl of Rochester

== In art ==
- When guns speak death settles dispute is Charles Marion Russell's epigrammatic title for a clash by gunfighters of the Old West in America.

== See also ==
- Admetus (epigrammatist)
- Aphorism
- Epigraph (archeology)
- Epigraph (literature)
- Epitaph
- List of anthologies of Greek epigrams
