= Aristodemus (disambiguation) =

Aristodemus was a mythological figure who was a descendant of Heracles.

Aristodemus may also refer to:

== Ancient Greece ==
=== Historical ===
- Aristodemus of Messenia (8th century BC), hero of the First Messenian War
- Aristodemus of Cumae (6th century BC), strategos and tyrant of Cumae
- Aristodemus of Sparta (5th century BC), Spartan warrior
- Aristodemus of Cydathenaeum (5th century BC), follower of Socrates depicted in Plato's Symposium
- Aristodemus of Miletus (4th century BC), diplomat
- Aristodemus (actor) (4th century BC), a different diplomat, who had a background as a tragic actor
- Aristodemus the Good or Aristodemus of Megalopolis (3rd century BC), tyrant of Megalopolis who was assassinated around 252 BC

=== Literary ===
- Aristodemus of Nysa the Elder (1st century BC), Ancient Greek grammarian and pedagogue
- Aristodemus of Nysa the Younger (1st century BC), Ancient Greek scholar and pedagogue, teacher of Strabo
- Aristodemus of Elis, an obscure writer working some time before the 2nd century
- Aristodemus of Thebes, author, see[List of anthologies of Greek epigrams
- Plutarch in his Parallel Lives speaks of an Aristodemus as the author of a collection of fables, one of which he relates.
- Plutarch elsewhere speaks of a Platonic philosopher named Aristodemus who lived at the same time as Plutarch.
- Another Aristodemus was mentioned by Athenaeus as the author of a work titled γελοῖα ἀπομνημονεύματα.
- A third Aristodemus, occurs in Clement of Alexandria's Stromata as the author of a work titled περὶ εὑπημάτων.
- A fourth Aristodemus is mentioned as the epitomizer of a work of Herodian.

=== Art ===
- Aristodemus, a painter, the father and instructor of Nicomachus of Thebes, flourished probably in the early part of the fourth century BCE.
- Aristodemus, a sculptor, who lived after the time of Alexander the Great, that is, some time around the 3rd century BCE. Among other works of his Pliny the Elder mentions a statue of Seleucus I Nicator. To what country he belonged is uncertain.
- Aristodemus, a painter and art historian, a native of Caria, contemporary with Philostratus the elder, with whom he was connected by the ties of hospitality. He wrote a work giving an account of distinguished painters, of the cities in which painting had flourished most, and of the kings who had encouraged the art.

== Other uses ==
- Papilio aristodemus, a species of butterfly
