= Nicomachus of Thebes =

Ancient Greek painter

Nicomachus of Thebes (Greek: Νικόμαχος; fl. 4th century BC) was an ancient Greek painter, a native of Thebes, and a contemporary of the great painters of the Classical period. He trained under his father Aristides, also a painter.

Pliny gives a list of his works; among them a Rape of Proserpina, Victory in a Quadriga, Apollo and Diana, and Cybele seated on a Lion. Many of his works were taken to Rome. Pliny tells us that he was a very rapid worker and claims that he was one of the painters who used only four colors. Plutarch mentions his paintings as possessing the Homeric merit of ease and absence of effort. Cicero equally praises his works. Vitruvius observes that if his fame was less than his contemporaries, it was the fault of fortune rather than a lack of talent.

Nicomachus was taught by his father, Aristodemus, who was also a painter. Among Nicomachus's students were his young brother Ariston, his son Aristides of Thebes, and Philoxenus of Eretria.

== List of works ==
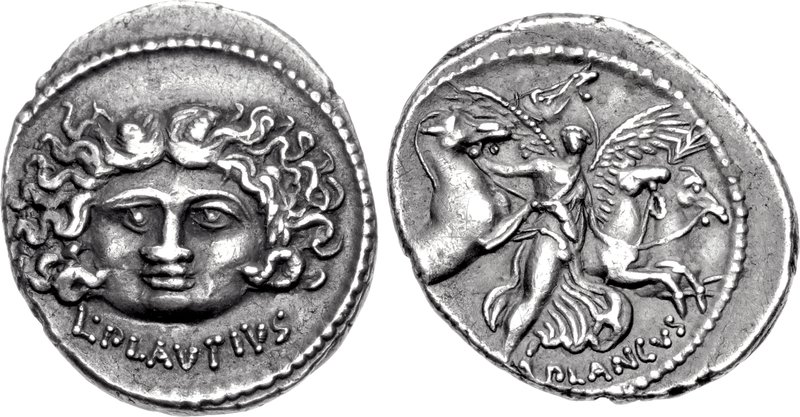
Denarius of Lucius Plautius Plancus, 47 BC. The reverse is a reproduction of Nicomachus' Victory in a Quadriga, which was placed in the Temple of Jupiter by Lucius Munatius Plancus, consul in 43 BC and Plautius' natural brother.

- Rape of Proserpina (located in the Temple of Jupiter Optimus Maximus, in the cella of Minerva)
- Victory in a Quadriga (located in the Temple of Jupiter Optimus Maximus)
- Ulysses
- Apollo and Diana
- Cybele seated on a Lion
- Bacchantes and Satyrs
- Scylla (located in the Temple of Peace, Rome)
- Monument to Telestis (originally in Sicyon)

== Sources ==
- Marcus Tullius Cicero, Brutus.
- Gaius Plinius Secundus (Pliny the Elder), Historia Naturalis (Natural History).
- Lucius Mestrius Plutarchus (Plutarch), Lives of the Noble Greeks and Romans.
- Michael Crawford, Roman Republican Coinage, Cambridge University Press (1974, 2001).
