= List of anthologies of Greek epigrams =

Modern knowledge of ancient Greek epigrams is largely based on works surviving in multi-author anthologies. The earliest known dateable anthology of epigrams is the Attic Epigrams collected by Philochorus in the late fourth century BC. This, and the second-century collection of Theban epigrams collected by Aristodemus of Thebes, were collected on a geographical basis, and were perhaps largely or entirely made up of epigrams found in local inscriptions; later collections were instead arranged by author or subject.

Known anthologies include:

- Attic Epigrams by Philochorus, late fourth century BC
- On the inscriptions to be found in cities, of Polemon of Ilium, second century BC
- Theban Epigrams (Θηβαϊκὰ ἐπιγράμματα) of Aristodemus of Thebes: second century BC; contained multiple books and included commentary
- Peri epigrammaton (Περὶ ἐπιγραμμάτων, "About epigrams") of Neoptolemus of Paros
- Garland of Meleagros (Στέφανος τοῦ Μελεάγρου), of Meleager of Gadara, about 90–80 BC. Meleager's introductory poem names 47 poets; works by other authors are known to have been included. About 4,000 lines from this collection are included in the Palatine Anthology.
- Garland of Philippus (Στέφανος τοῦ Φιλίππου τοῦ Θεσσαλονικέως), by Philippus of Thessalonica, mid-first century AD.
- Diogenianus, ἐπιγραμμάτωνἈνθολόγιον mentioned by the Suda. Diogenianus worked during the reign of Hadrian, and the collection perhaps contained epigrams from the first and second centuries AD.
- Musa Puerilis (Μοῦσα Παιδική), anthology of Straton of Sardis, second century, with pederastic content
- The Sylloge of Palladas, sixth century collection of epigrams and epic fragments
- Cycle of Agathias, second half of sixth century AD. Seven books of epigrams by Agathias and his contemporaries.
- Sylloge Euphemiana (about 890)
- Syllogae minores, a series of smaller collections from various sources, among which are Sylloge Parisina and Sylloge Euphemiana already mentioned above
- Anthology of Cephalas – compiled by Constantine Cephalas in the last decades of the ninth century; most important sources include the Garlands of Meleager and Philip, the Anthology of Diogenian, the Sylloge of Pallada and the Cycle of Agathias
- Palatine Anthology (Anthologia Palatina) – Byzantine anthology completed after 944, mostly a copy of Cephalas's anthology alongside other collections of epigrams and some longer poems.
- Sylloge Parisina: 13th-century manuscript of 114 epigrams, derived from Cephalas's anthology. The source of this manuscript may be an early abridgement of Cephalas's anthology, predating the Palatine Anthology.
- Anthology of Planudes (Anthologia Graeca Planudea) Maximus Planudes, completed between 1299 and 1301, based on two manuscript copies of the anthology of Cephalas.
- Greek Anthology (Anthologia Graeca): Term currently used for the collection of epigrams and poems of the Palatine and the Planudean Anthologies, as well as from other sources

In 1893, Richard August Reitzenstein proposed that the Soros ("Heap") mentioned by a scholiast on the Iliad was an anthology of epigrams by Posidippus, Hedylus, and Asclepiades of Samos. However, only Posidippus's works are known to have been included in the Soros and Kathryn Gutzwiller argues that it was a collection of Posidippus's poetry rather than an anthology.
