= Menecrates =

Menecrates (Greek: Μενεκράτης) is the name of:

- Menecrates of Ephesus, ancient Greek poet
- Menecrates of Syracuse, physician to Philip of Macedon
- Menecrates of Tralles, Greek physician during the 1st century BC
- Menecrates (sculptor), ancient Greek sculptor
- Menecrates, ancient Greek writer who wrote the history of the city of Nicaea
- Tomb of Menecrates, an archaic tomb in Corfu.
- A pirate in William Shakespeare's play Antony and Cleopatra
