= Aristodemus of Nysa =

Aristodemus of Nysa can refer to one of two related men of ancient Greece:

- Aristodemus of Nysa the Elder
- Aristodemus of Nysa the Younger
