= Anthology =

Collection of creative works chosen by the compiler

In book publishing, an anthology is a collection of literary works chosen by the compiler. It may be a collection of plays, poems, short stories, songs, fiction or non-fiction excerpts. There are also thematic and genre-based anthologies. Complete collections of works are also called "complete works" or opera omnia in Latin.

== Etymology ==
The word "anthology" entered the English language in the 17th century, from the Greek word, ἀνθολογία (anthologia, literally "a collection of blossoms", from ἄνθος, ánthos, flower), a reference to one of the earliest known anthologies, the Garland (Στέφανος, stéphanos), the introduction to which compares each of its anthologized poets to a flower. That Garland by Meléagros of Gadara formed the kernel for what has become known as the Greek Anthology. Florilegium, a Latin derivative for a collection of flowers, was used in medieval Europe for an anthology of Latin proverbs and textual excerpts. Shortly before "anthology" had entered the language, English had begun using "florilegium" as a word for such a collection.

== History ==
=== Before 20th century ===
==== Europe ====
The Palatine Anthology, discovered in the Bibliotheca Palatina, Heidelberg in 1606, is a collection of Greek poems and epigrams based on the lost 10th-century Byzantine collection of Constantine Kephalas, which in turn was based on older anthologies. In the Middle Ages, European collections of florilegia became popular, bringing together extracts from various Christian and pagan philosophical texts. These evolved into commonplace books and miscellanies, including proverbs, quotes, letters, poems and prayers.

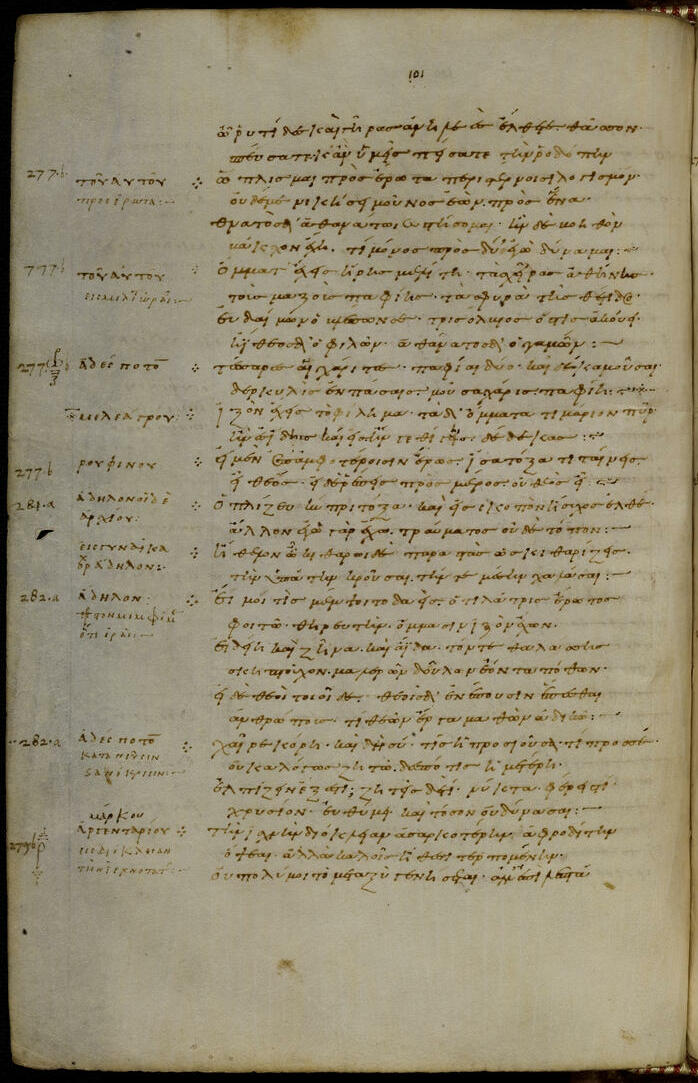
Page of 10th-century Palatine Anthology (Codex Palatinus 23). University of Heidelberg Library

Songes and Sonettes, usually called Tottel's Miscellany, was the first printed anthology of English poetry. It was published by Richard Tottel in 1557 in London and ran to many editions in the 16th century. A widely read series of political anthologies, Poems on Affairs of State, began its publishing run in 1689, finishing in 1707.

In Britain, one of the earliest national poetry anthologies to appear was The British Muse (1738), compiled by William Oldys. Thomas Percy's influential Reliques of Ancient English Poetry (1765), was the first of the great ballad collections, responsible for the ballad revival in English poetry that became a significant part of the Romantic movement. William Enfield's The Speaker; Or, Miscellaneous Pieces was published in 1774 and was a mainstay of 18th-century schoolrooms.

Important 19th-century anthologies include Palgrave's Golden Treasury (1861), Edward Arber's Shakespeare Anthology (1899) and the first edition of Arthur Quiller Couch's Oxford Book of English Verse (1900).

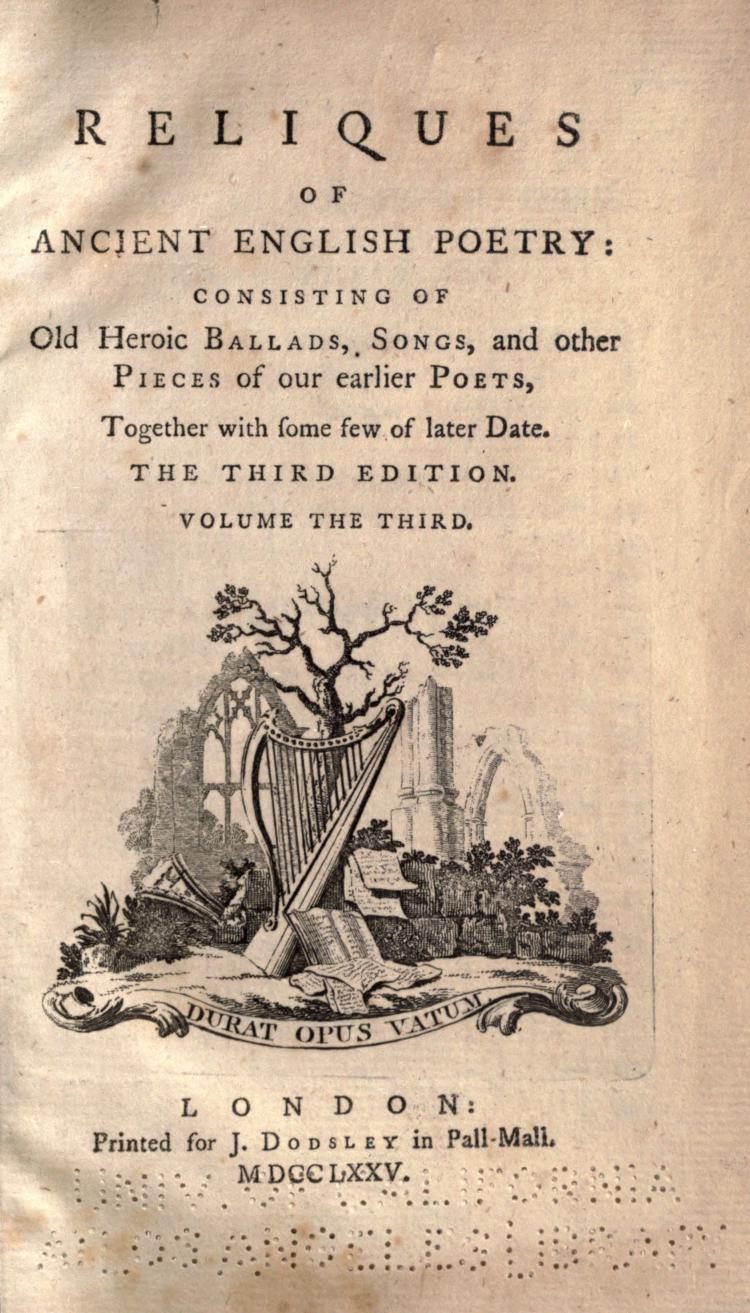
Title page of third edition of Reliques of Ancient English Poetry (1775)

==== Asia ====
In East Asian traditions, an anthology was a recognized form of compilation of a given poetic form. It was assumed that there was a cyclic development: any particular form, say the tanka in Japan, would be introduced at one point in history, be explored by masters during a subsequent time, and finally be subject to popularisation (and a certain dilution) when it achieved widespread recognition. In this model, which derives from Chinese tradition, the object of compiling an anthology was to preserve the best of a form, and cull the rest.

In Malaysia, an anthology (or antologi in Malay) is a collection of syair, sajak (or modern prose), proses, drama scripts, and pantuns. Notable anthologies that are used in secondary schools include Sehijau Warna Daun, Seuntai Kata Untuk Dirasa, Anak Bumi Tercinta, Anak Laut and Kerusi.

In Iran, anthologies go by many names, one of which is gulchīn, or "plucked flowers," akin to the original meaning of "anthology."

=== 20th century ===
In the 20th century, anthologies became an important part of poetry publishing for a number of reasons. For English poetry, the Georgian poetry series was trend-setting; it showed the potential success of publishing an identifiable group of younger poets marked out as a "generation". It was followed by numerous collections from the "stable" of some literary editor, or collated from a given publication, or labelled in some fashion as "poems of the year". Academic publishing also followed suit, with the continuing success of the Quiller-Couch Oxford Book of English Verse encouraging other collections not limited to modern poetry. Not everyone approved. Robert Graves and Laura Riding published their Pamphlet Against Anthologies in 1928, arguing that they were based on commercial rather than artistic interests.

The concept of modern verse was fostered by the appearance of the phrase in titles such as the Faber & Faber anthology by Michael Roberts in 1936, and the very different William Butler Yeats Oxford Book of Modern Verse of the same year. In the 1960s, The Mersey Sound anthology of Liverpool poets became a bestseller, plugging into the countercultural attitudes of teenagers.

Since publishers generally found anthology publication a more flexible medium than the collection of a single poet's work, and indeed rang innumerable changes on the idea as a way of marketing poetry, publication in an anthology (in the right company) became at times a sought-after form of recognition for poets. The self-definition of movements, dating back at least to Ezra Pound's efforts on behalf of Imagism, could be linked on one front to the production of an anthology of the like-minded.

Also, while not connected with poetry, publishers have produced collective works of fiction and non-fiction from a number of authors and used the term anthology to describe the collective nature of the text. These have been in a number of subjects, including Erotica, edited by Mitzi Szereto, and American Gothic Tales edited by Joyce Carol Oates. The Assassin's Cloak: An Anthology of the World's Greatest Diarists, published in 2000, anthologises four centuries of diary entries into 365 "days".

== See also ==
- Chrestomathy
- Diwan
- List of anthologies of Greek epigrams
- Omnibus edition
- Primer
