= Aristodemus of Elis =

Aristodemus (Ancient Greek: Ἀριστόδημος) of Elis was an ancient Greek writer who was referred to by Harpocration as an authority respecting the number of the Hellanodikai. He is probably the same writer as the one mentioned by Tertullian and Eusebius.

An "Aristodemus" is mentioned by Athenaeus as the author of a commentary on Pindar, and is often referred to in the Scholia on Pindar, but whether this Aristodemus is the one from Elis or Aristodemus of Nysa or another Aristodemus entirely is unknown.
