= Euphranor =

Ancient Greek sculptor and painter

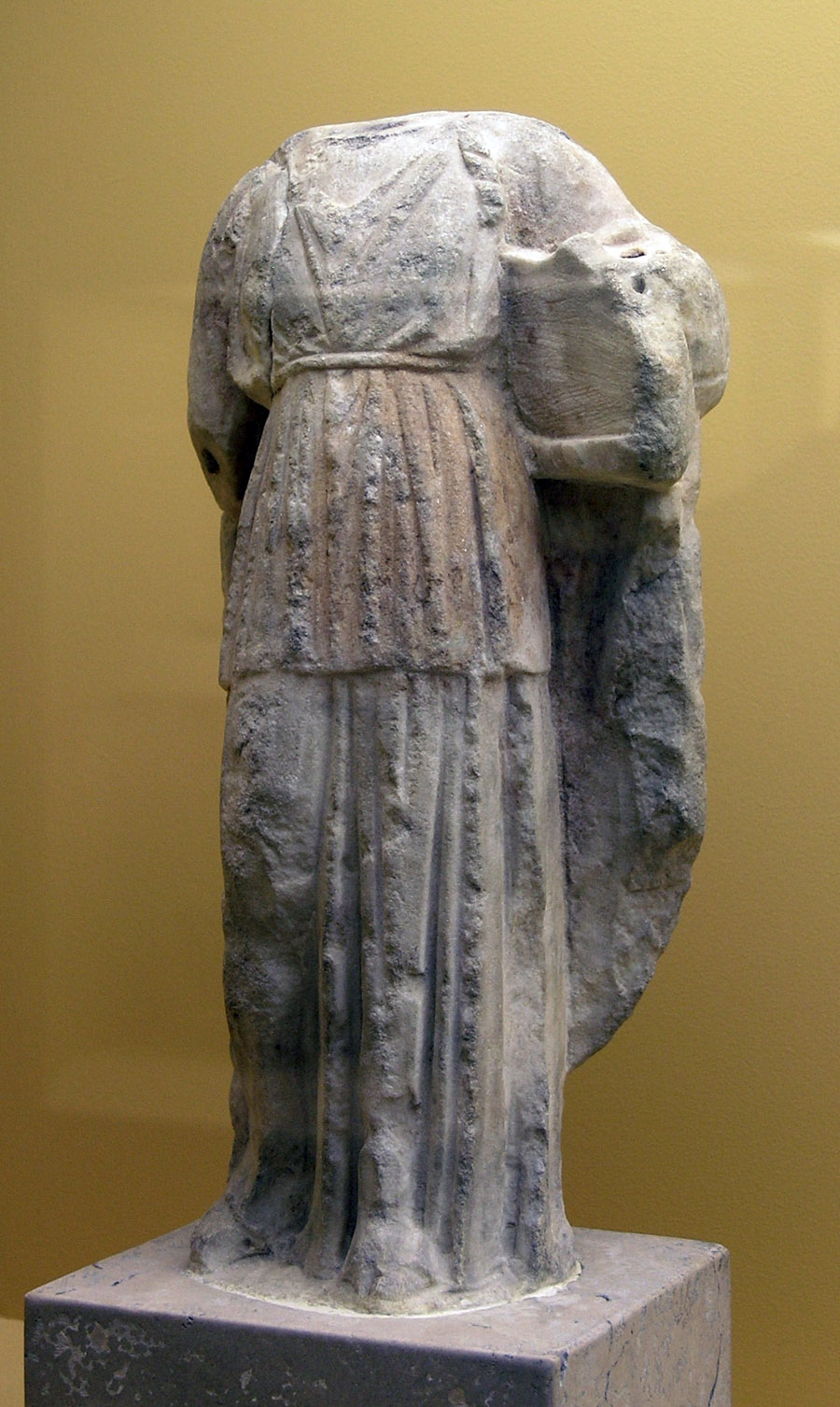
AGMA Apollon Patroos Euphranor.

Euphranor of Corinth (Ancient Greek: Εὐφράνωρ) (middle of the 4th century BC) was a Greek artist. Pliny the Elder provides a list of his works including a cavalry battle, the Twelve Gods, a painting of the feigned madness of Odysseus, and a Theseus, Euphranor said regarding his statue of Theseus, that Parrhasius's Theseus had lived on a diet of roses, whereas his own was a beef-eater.

No known existing statues have been identified as copies from works of Euphranor (but see a series of attributions by Six in Jahrbuch, 1909, 7 foil.). His work appears to have resembled that of his contemporary Lysippus, notably in the attention he paid to symmetry, in his preference for bodily forms slighter than those usual in earlier art, and in his love of heroic subjects. He wrote influential treatises on painting, on topics including proportions and color.

He was a contemporary of Antorides, and, like him, studied under Ariston.
