= Antorides =

Greek painter

Antorides was a painter of ancient Greece. He was a contemporary with Euphranor, and, like him, a pupil of Aristo. He flourished about 340 BC.
