= Archaeological Museum of Corfu =

Museum in Corfu, Greece

Coordinates: 39.6188°N 19.9219°E

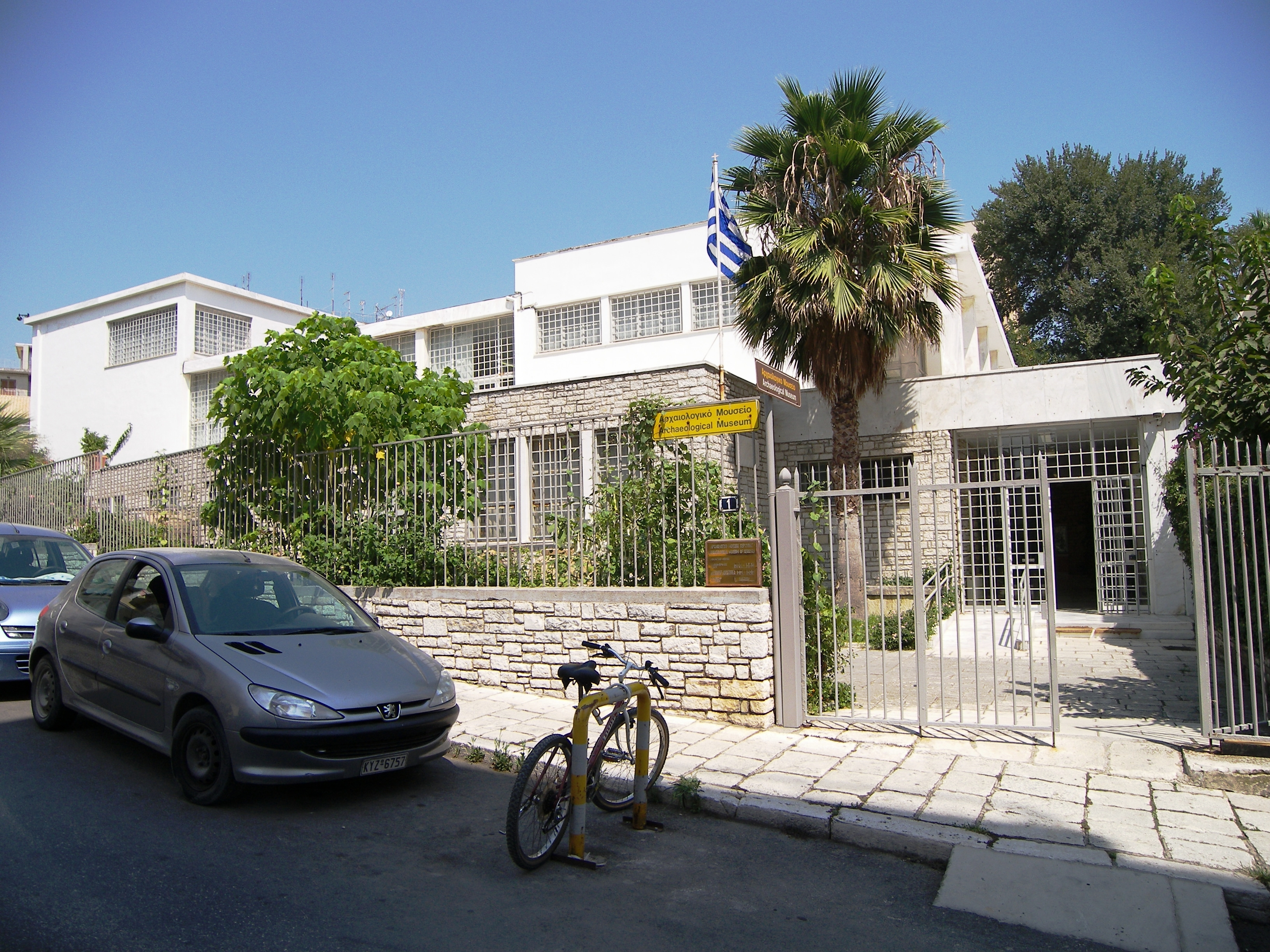
Archaeological Museum of Corfu.

The Archaeological Museum of Corfu (Greek: Αρχαιολογικό Μουσείο Κέρκυρας) in Corfu, Greece was built between 1962 and 1965. The museum land was donated by the city of Corfu. Its initial purpose was to house the archaeological finds from the Temple of Artemis in Corfu. In 1994 it was expanded with the addition of two more exhibit halls that display the more recent finds at the ancient citadel of Corfu. It is located on 1 Vraila Armeni St.

== Collections ==
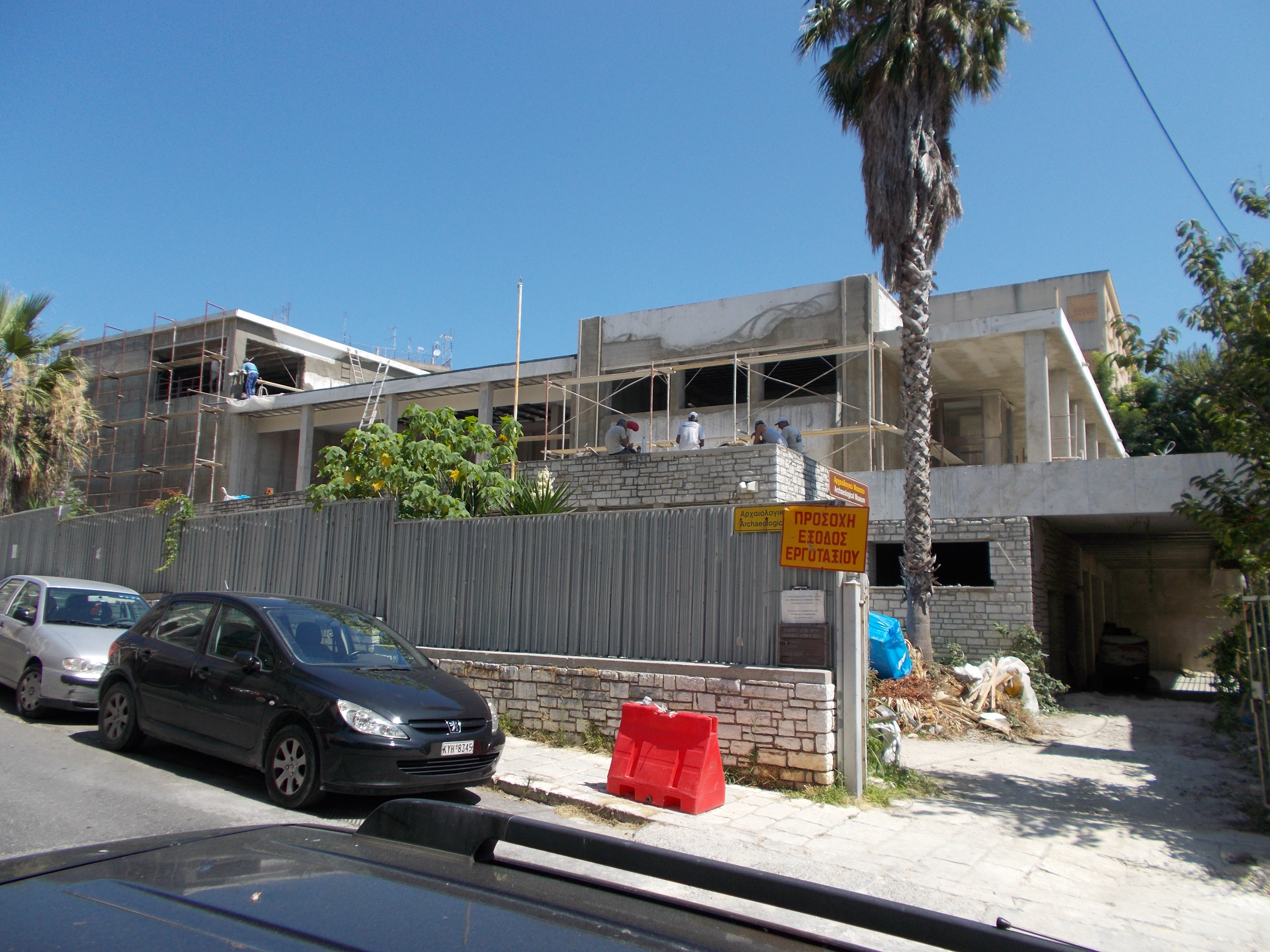
Renovations at the archaeological museum of Corfu.

The collections of the museum include:

- A collection of unknown origin.
- Finds from excavations from the ancient city of Corfu.
- Finds from the region of Cassiope in Corfu.
- Finds from excavations in the district of Thesprotia.

The main exhibits are:

- The cenotaph of Menecrates/Menekrates.
- The Gorgon pediment from the Artemis temple of Corfu. It is the oldest stone pediment in Greece dated to 590-580 BC and is described in the New York Times review of the museum as: the finest example of Archaic temple sculpture extant.
- The Lion of Menecrates. This is the work of a famous Corinthian sculptor of the Archaic period. Dated to the end of the 7th century BC.
- The pediment of Dionysus (Bacchus). Dated to 500 BC.
- The base and part of the body of a kore from the late Archaic period. It was found during the excavation of a pottery workshop in the area of Figareto.
- A marble torso of Apollo. This is a copy of the original statue of "Parnopios Apollo" created by Pheidias (its type is known as the "Kassel Apollo"). Dated to the 2nd century AD.
- Funerary stele of Philistion daughter of Agenos and Arpalis, with inscription: Φιλίστιον Χ[αιρε]. Δοιαί μεν δεκάδες σε τελειοτόκων ενιαυτών ήδη και τριτάτου κύκλος επείχεν έτευς μισγομένα φθιμένοιαι, φιλίστιον, ανίκα πέ[νθος] ματρί πολυθρηνήτω κάλλιπες Αρπαλίδι. δώμα δ’ Αριστάνδροιο λελονχότος άκριτον αί[σαν] και τέκεα κρυερά θήκας εν ορφανία. Αγήνος κλυτόν αίμα, σε δ’ ύστατον ύπνον ελο[ύσαν]. πικρός όδε ζοφερά τύμβος έδεκτ[ο κόνει]. approximately translated as: "Greetings Philistion. You went twenty three years old in the underworld and left your mother Arpalis in mourning, your husband Aristandros widower and confused, and the children cold as orphans. [You], the glorious blood of Agenos, having chosen for yourself the last sleep, this bitter, pitch-dark tomb has accepted you [in the dust]."
- The terracotta statuettes of Artemis. They were found in large quantities in the small temple of Artemis at Kanoni in Corfu city.
- Four cases with coins found in excavations at various sites of Corfu.

On 15 October 2010, the museum was closed for works. It is now reopened.

- The Stele of Arniadas

== Museum exhibits ==
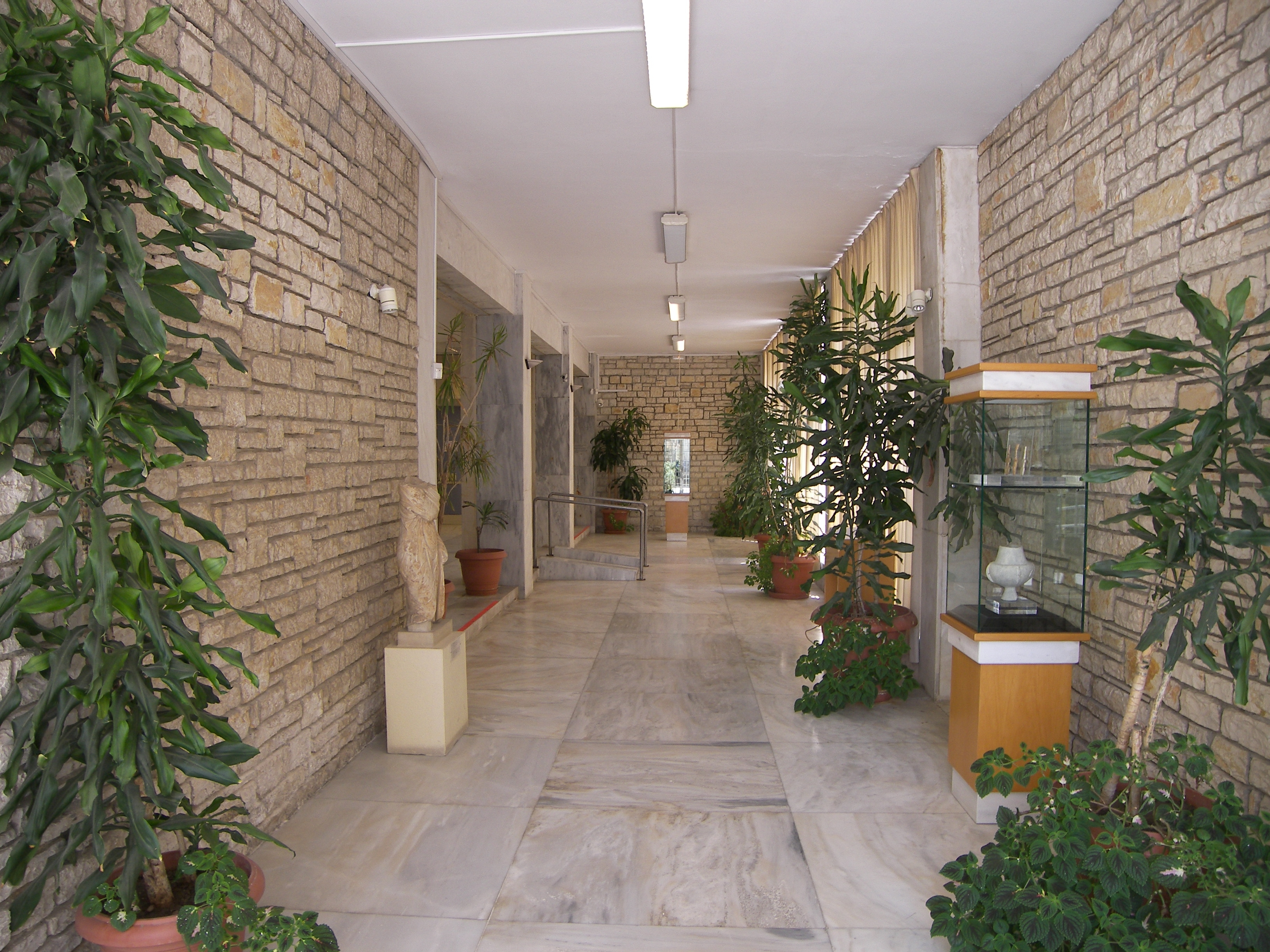
Museum Entrance Hall

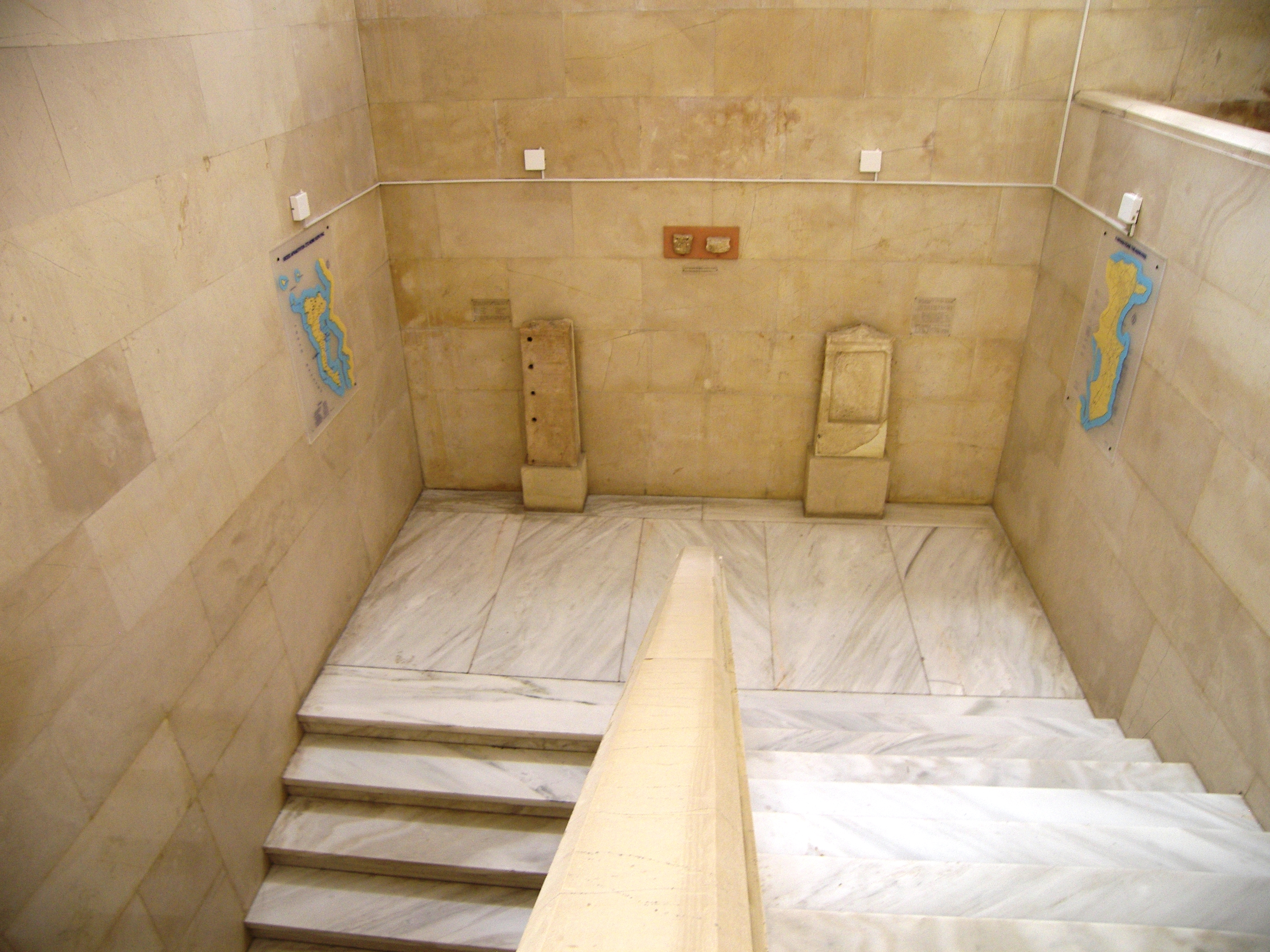
Main stairway

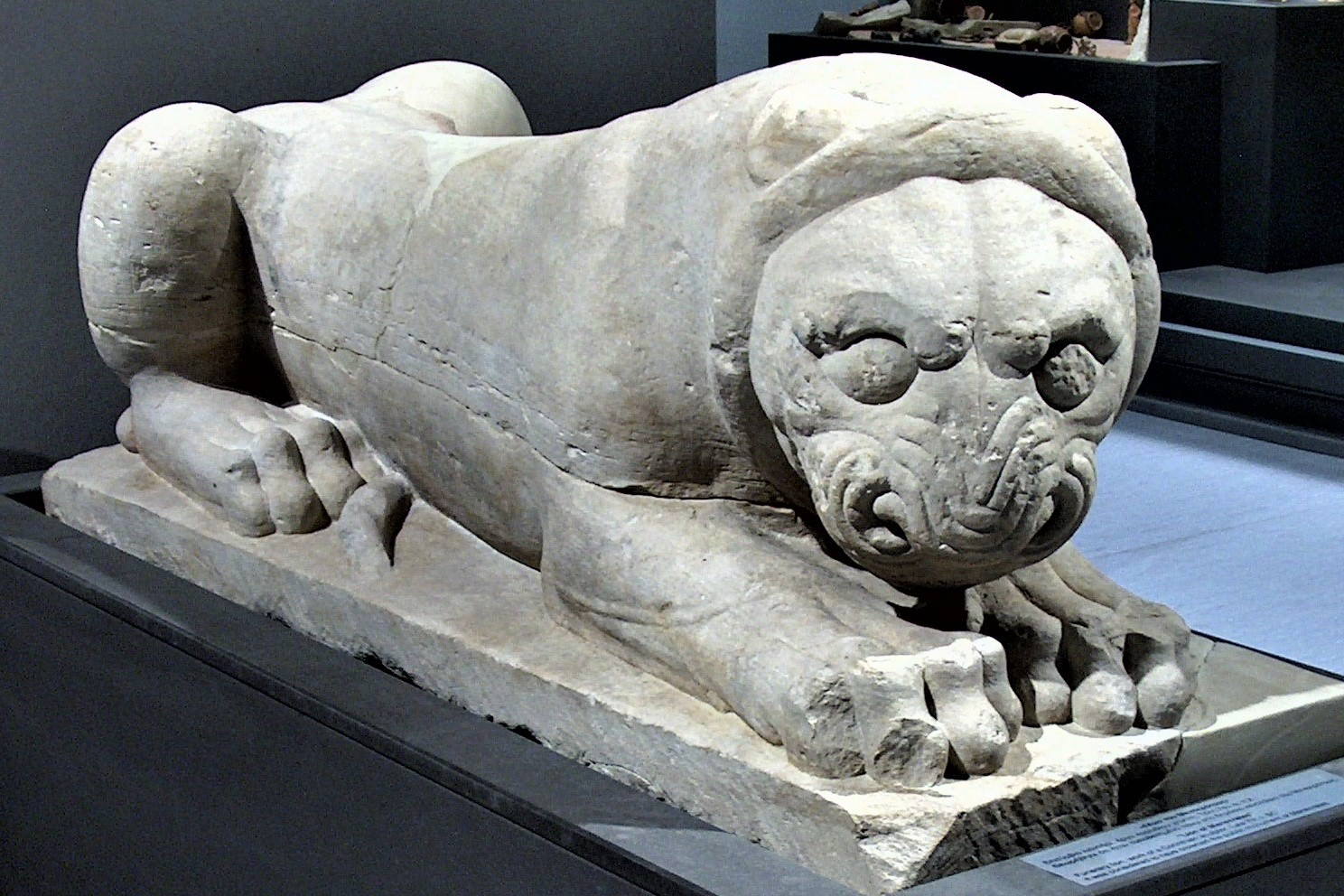
The Lion of Menecrates. Funerary statue of a crouching lion, found near the cenotaph of Menecrates. This is the work of a famous Corinthian sculptor of the Archaic period. Dated end of the 7th century BC.

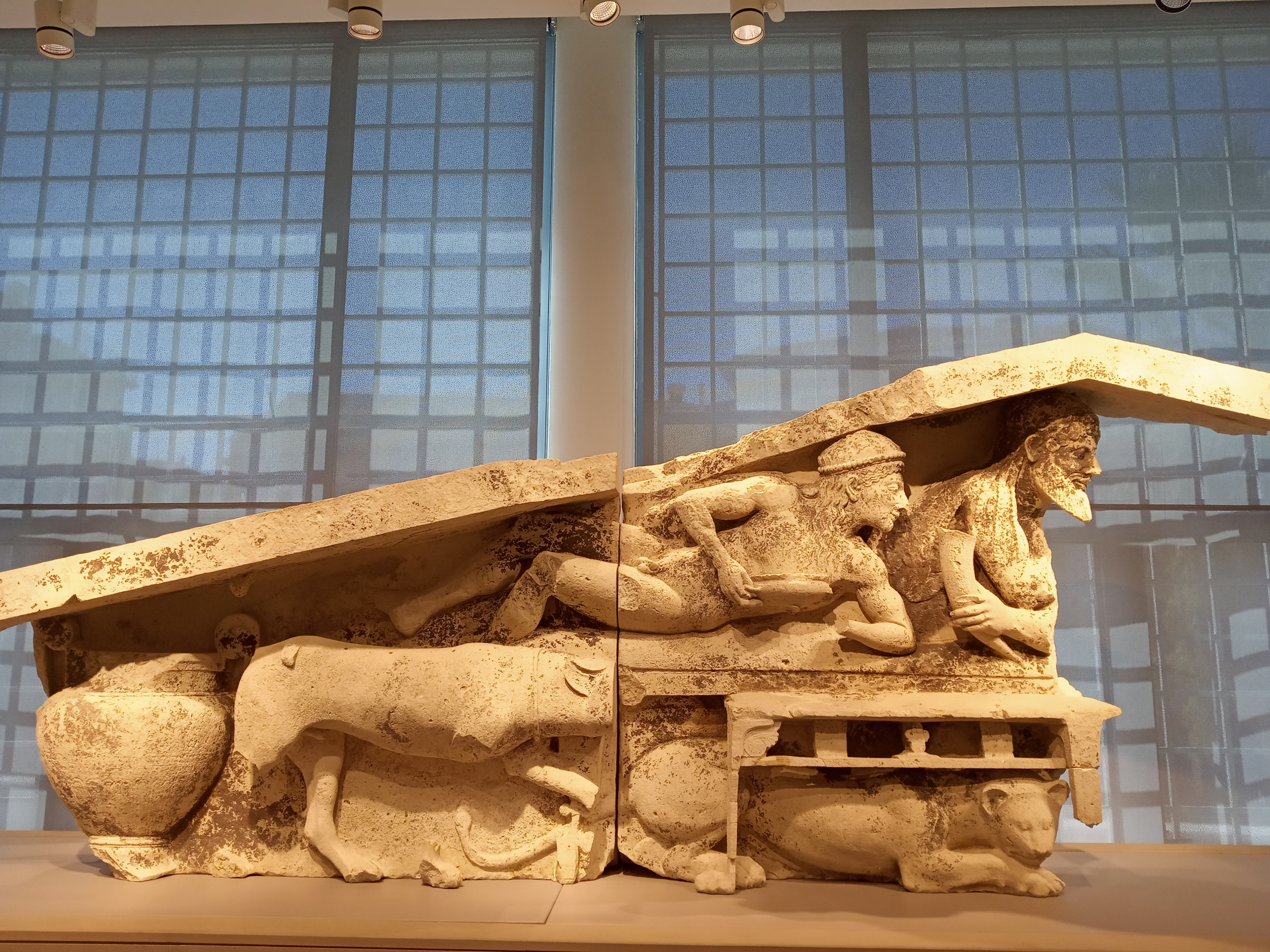
Pediment with Dionysos at the Corfu Museum. Left part of an Archaic pediment from the area of Figareto. It depicts a Dionysiac symposium. Dated to 500 BC.

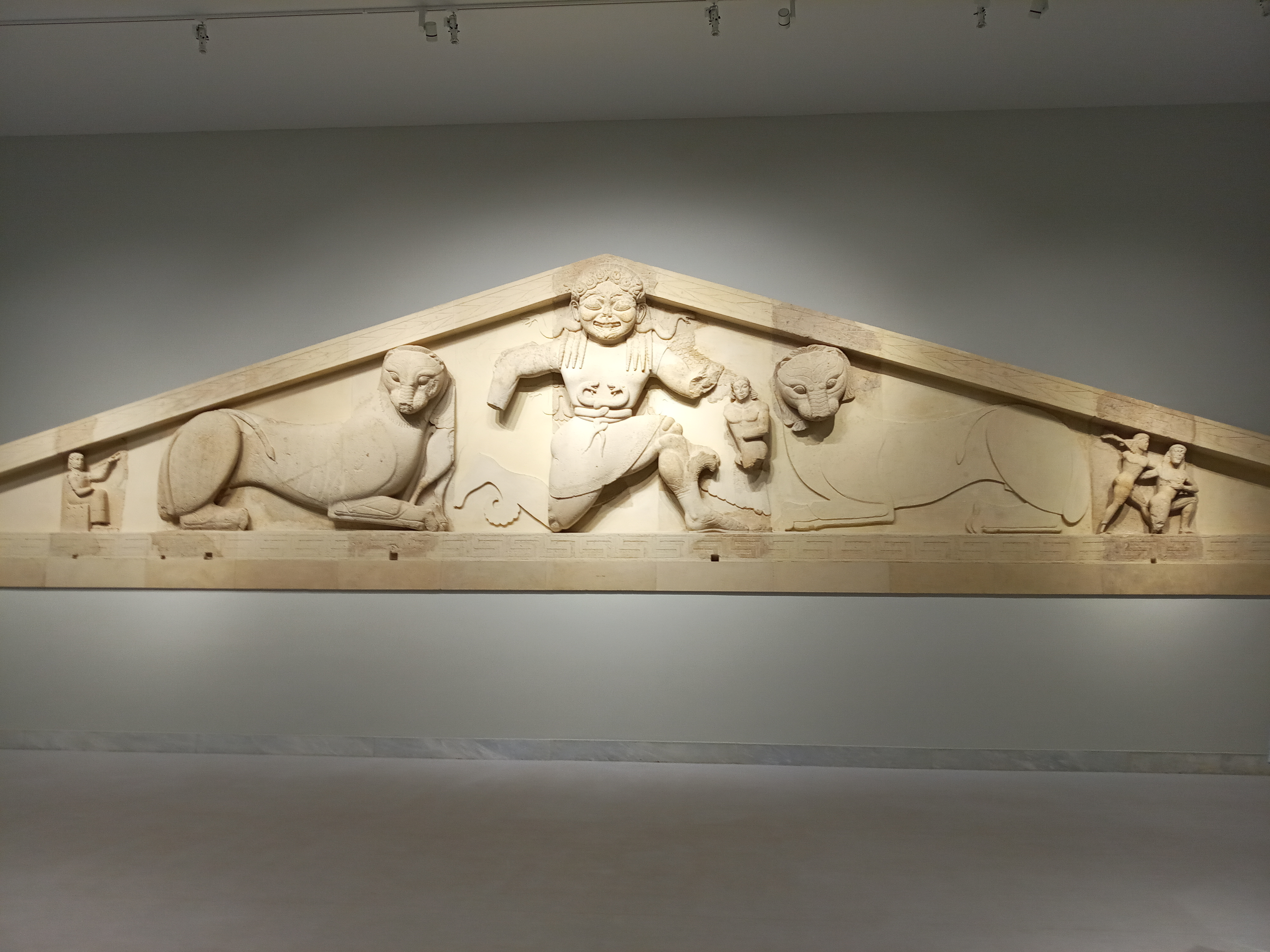
The Gorgon as depicted on the western pediment from the Artemis Temple of Corfu, on display at the Archaeological Museum of Corfu.

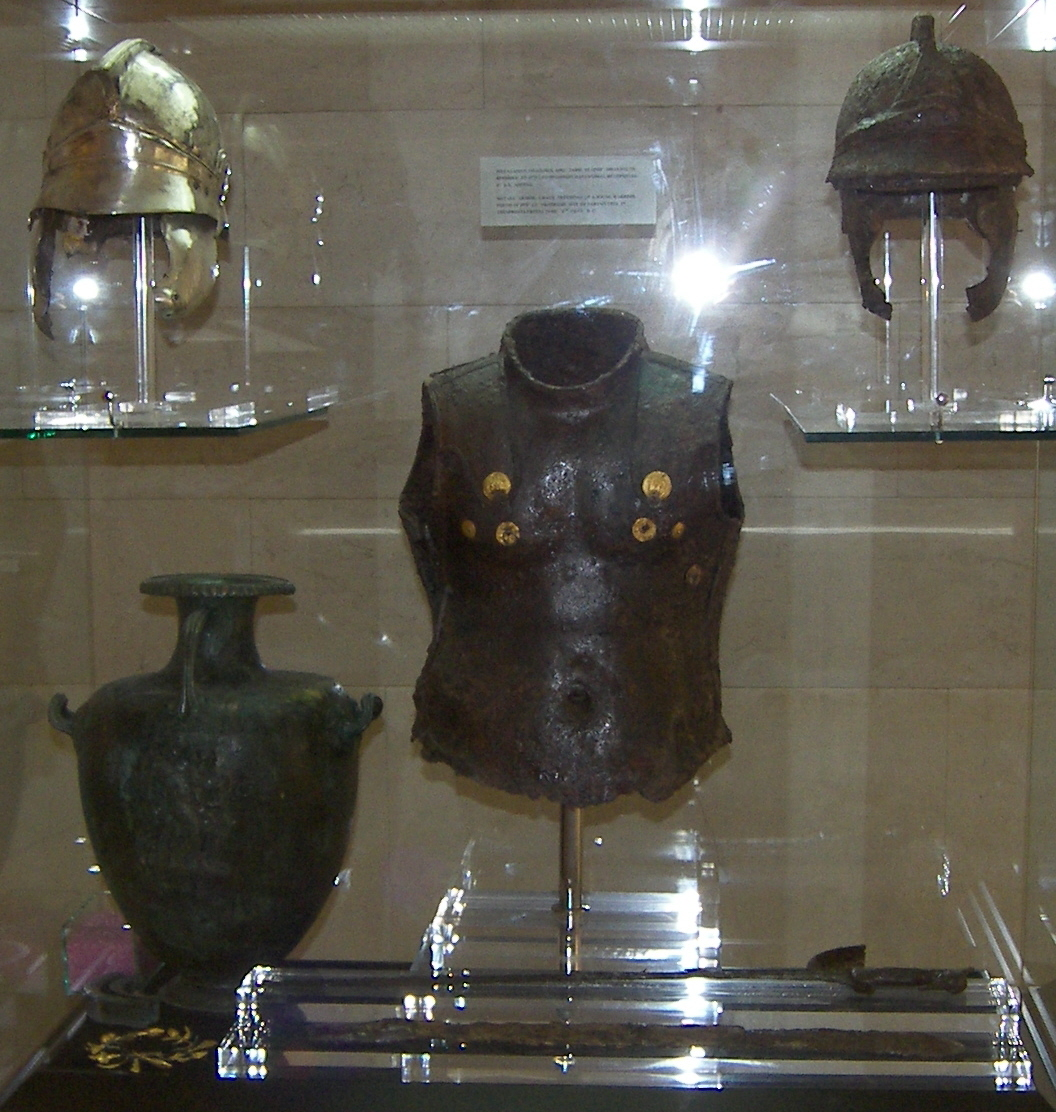
Hoplite armour exhibit. Note the gold inserts around the chest area of the bronze upper torso plate at the centre of the exhibit. The helmet on the upper left is a restored version of the oxidised helmet on the right.

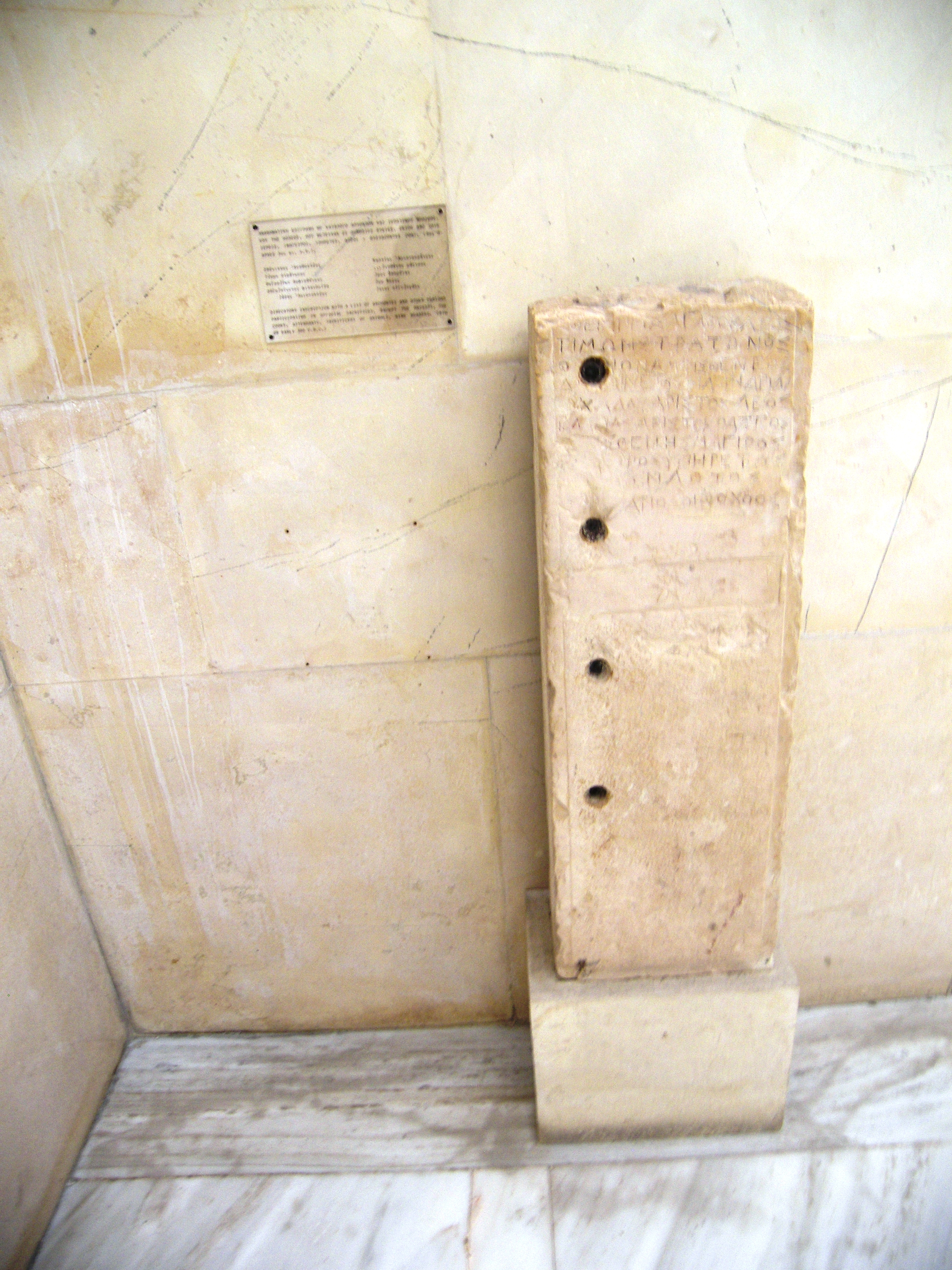
Funerary stele with inscription

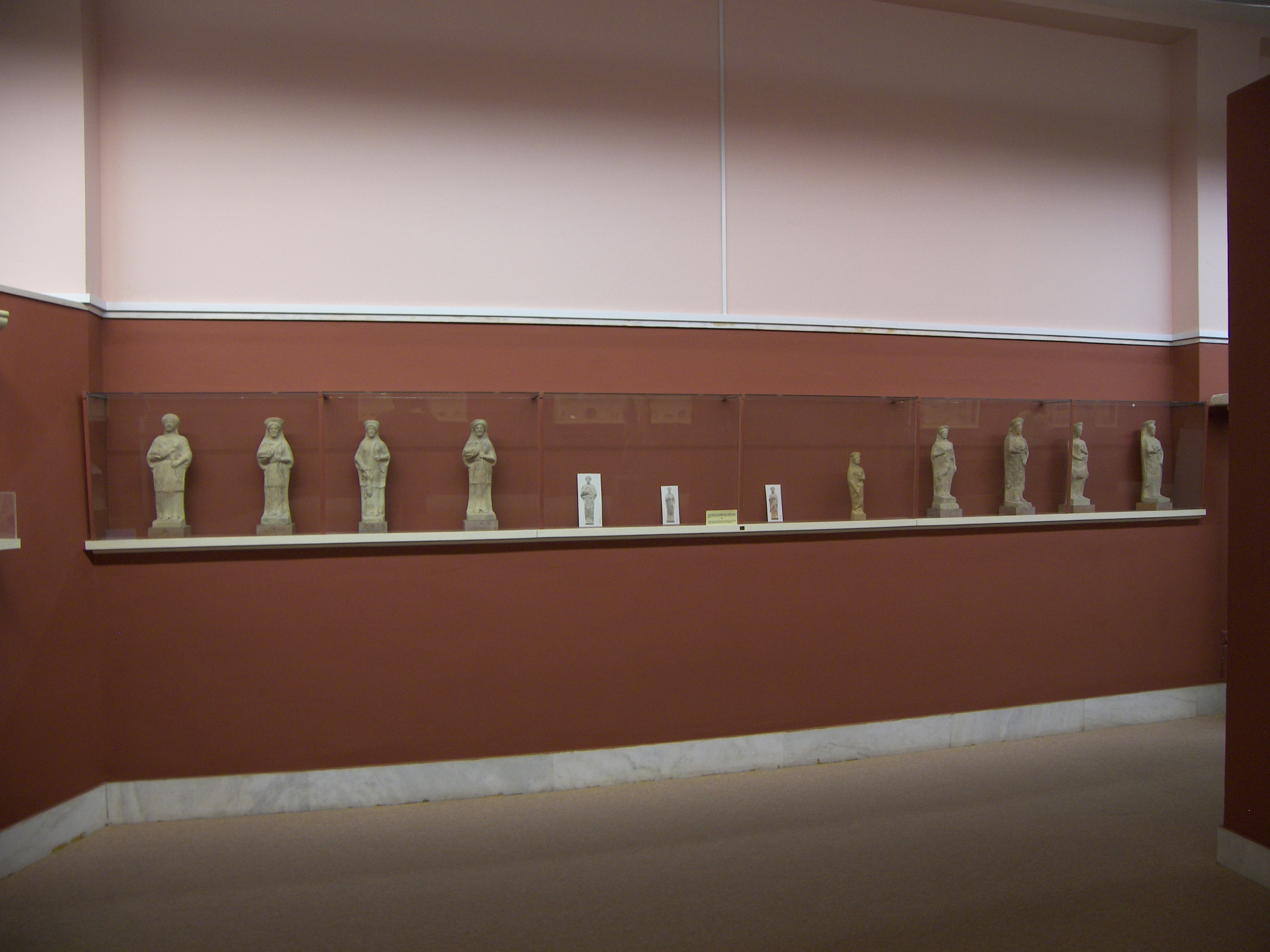
Exhibit of some of the terracotta statuettes of Artemis. They were found in large quantities in the small temple of Artemis at Kanoni in Corfu city.

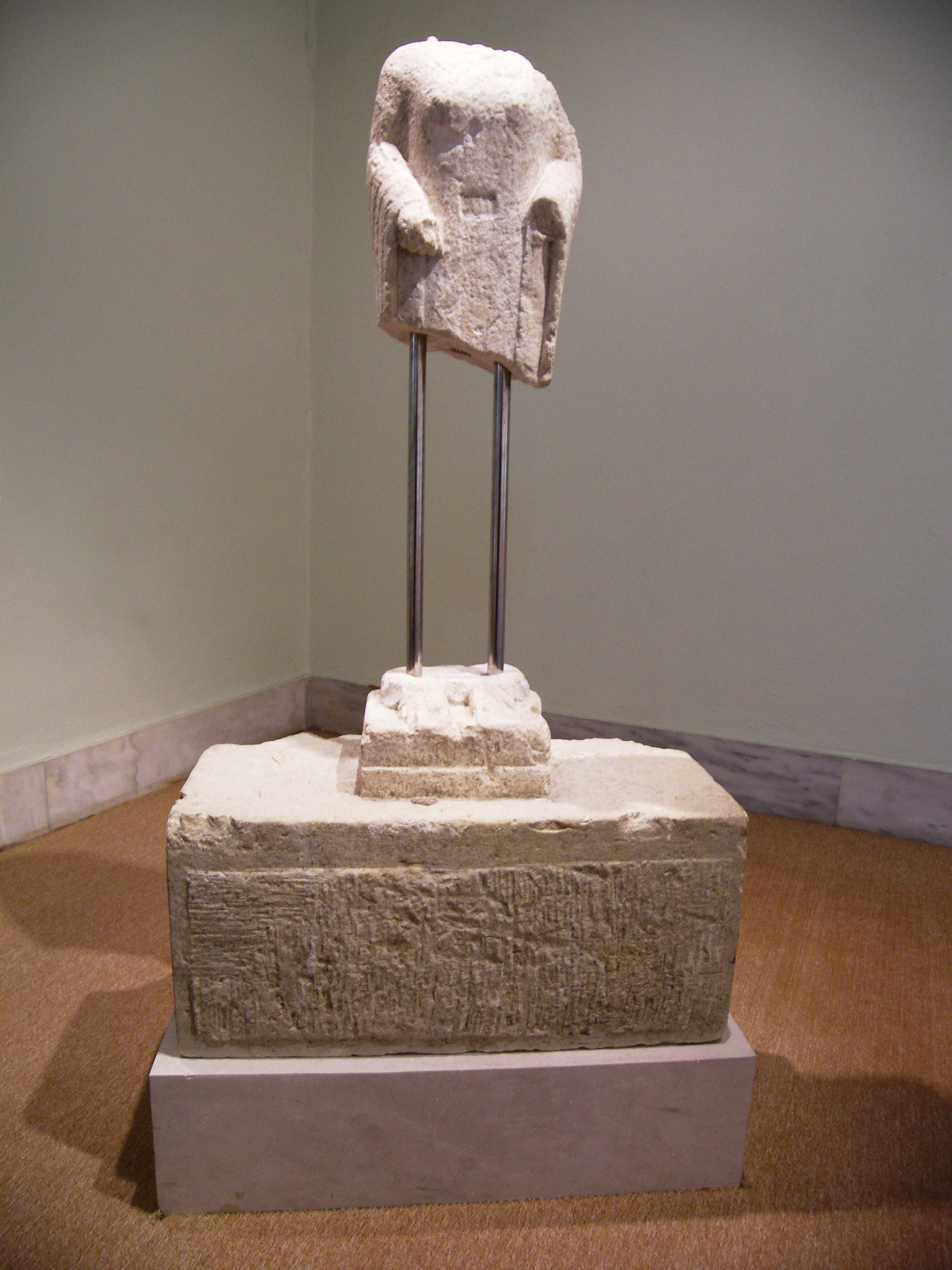
Base and body of Archaic kore

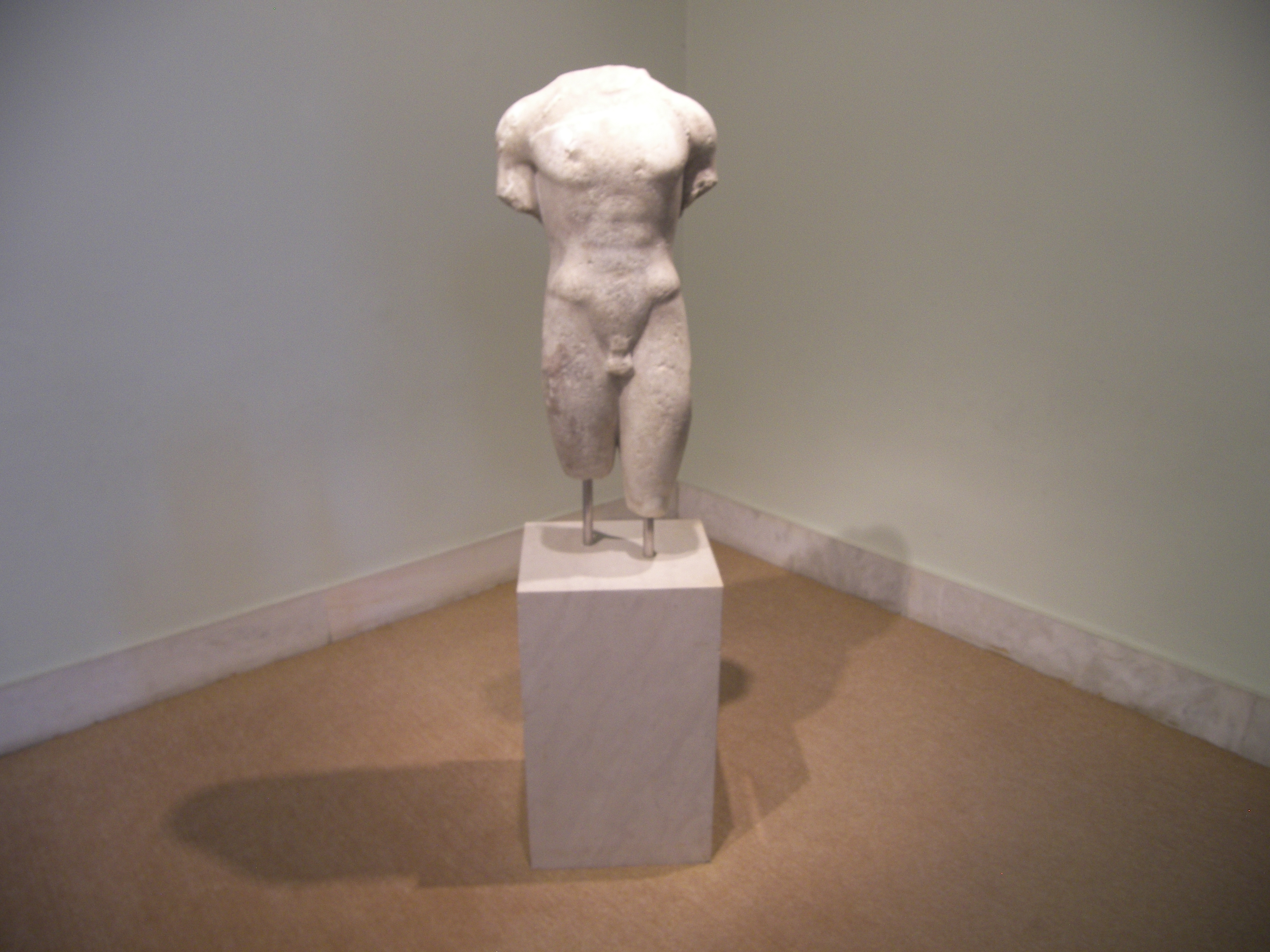
Marble torso of Apollo

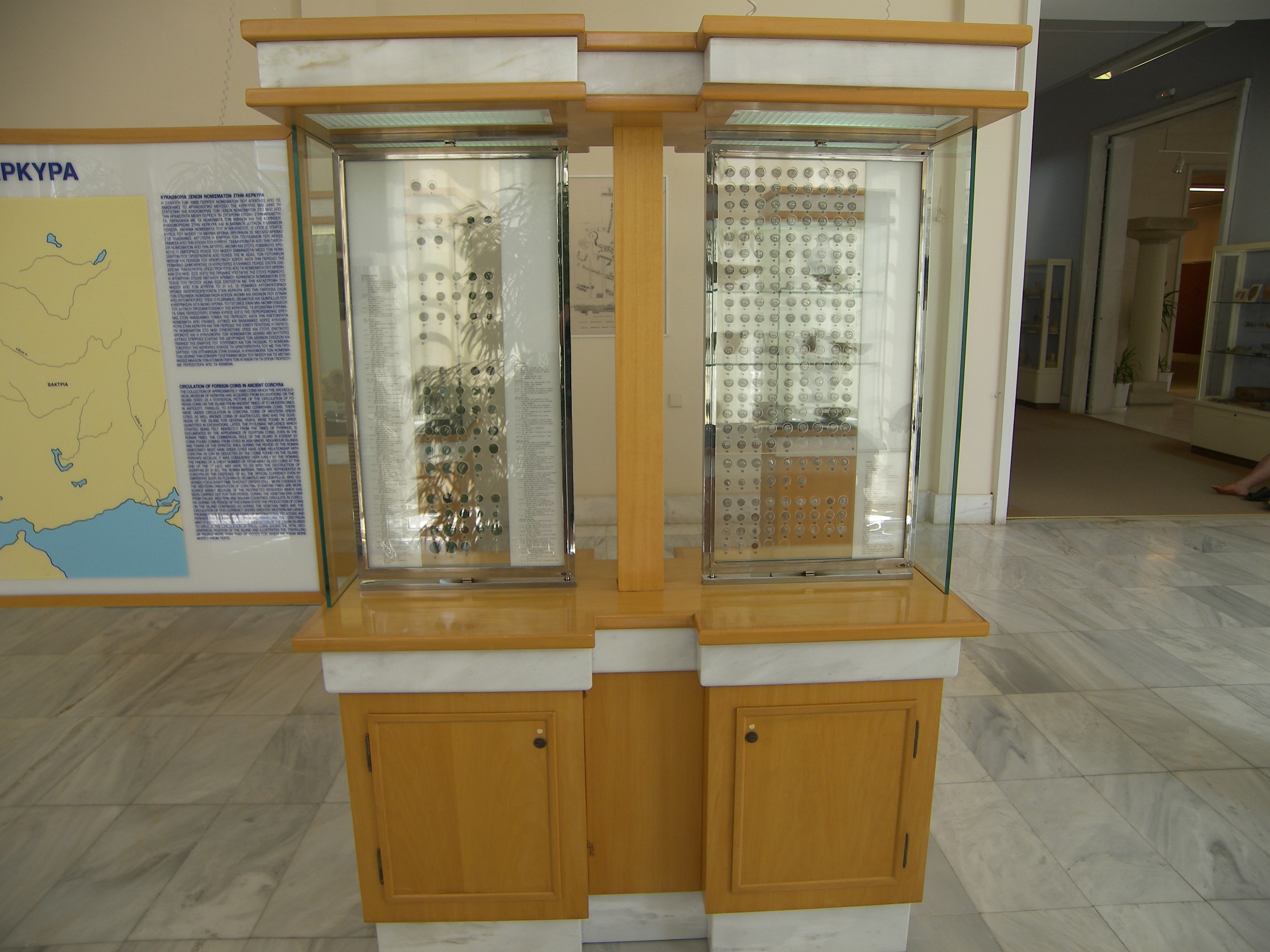
Coin exhibit

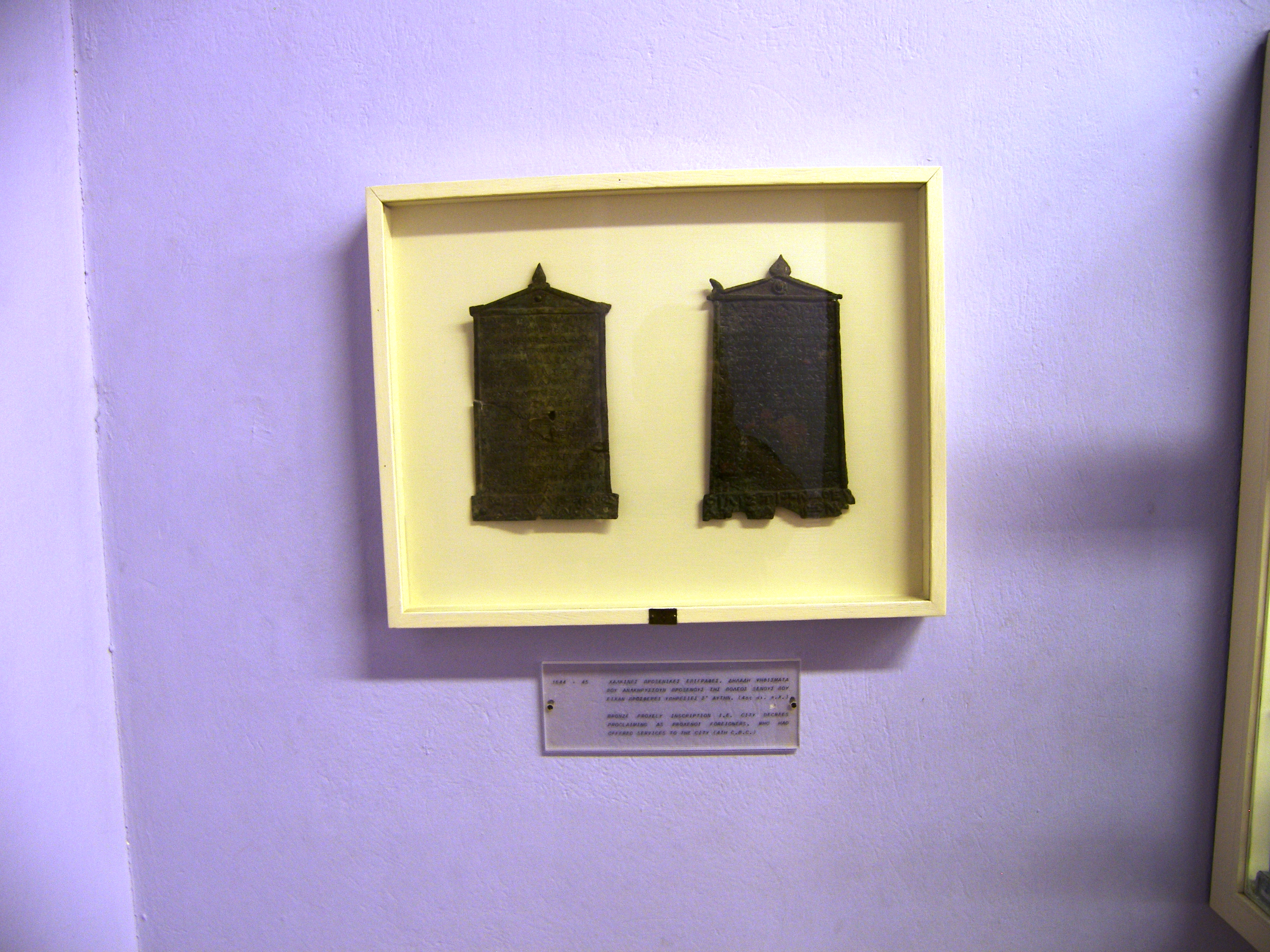
Bronze proxeny inscriptions

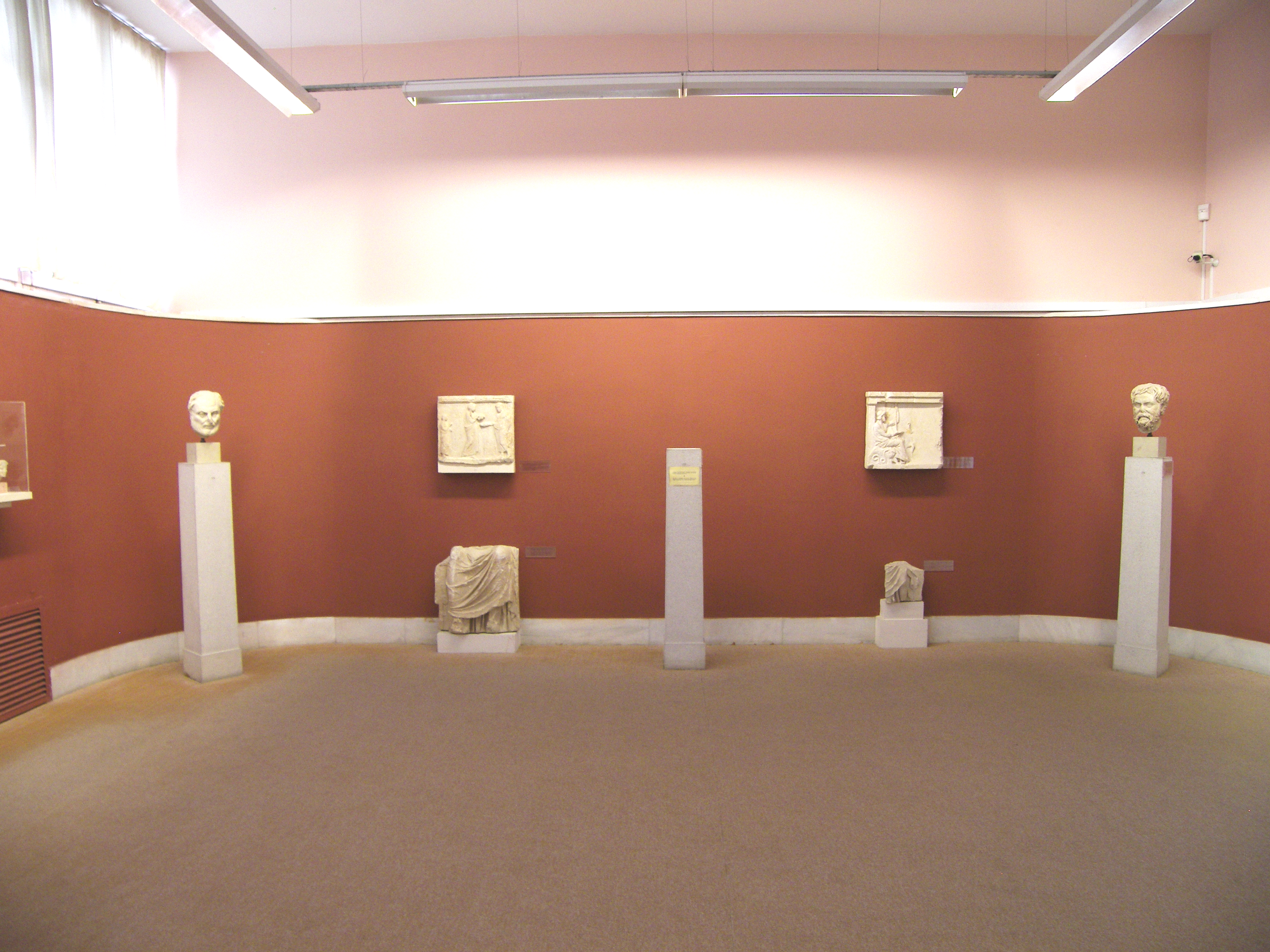
Busts and architectural details

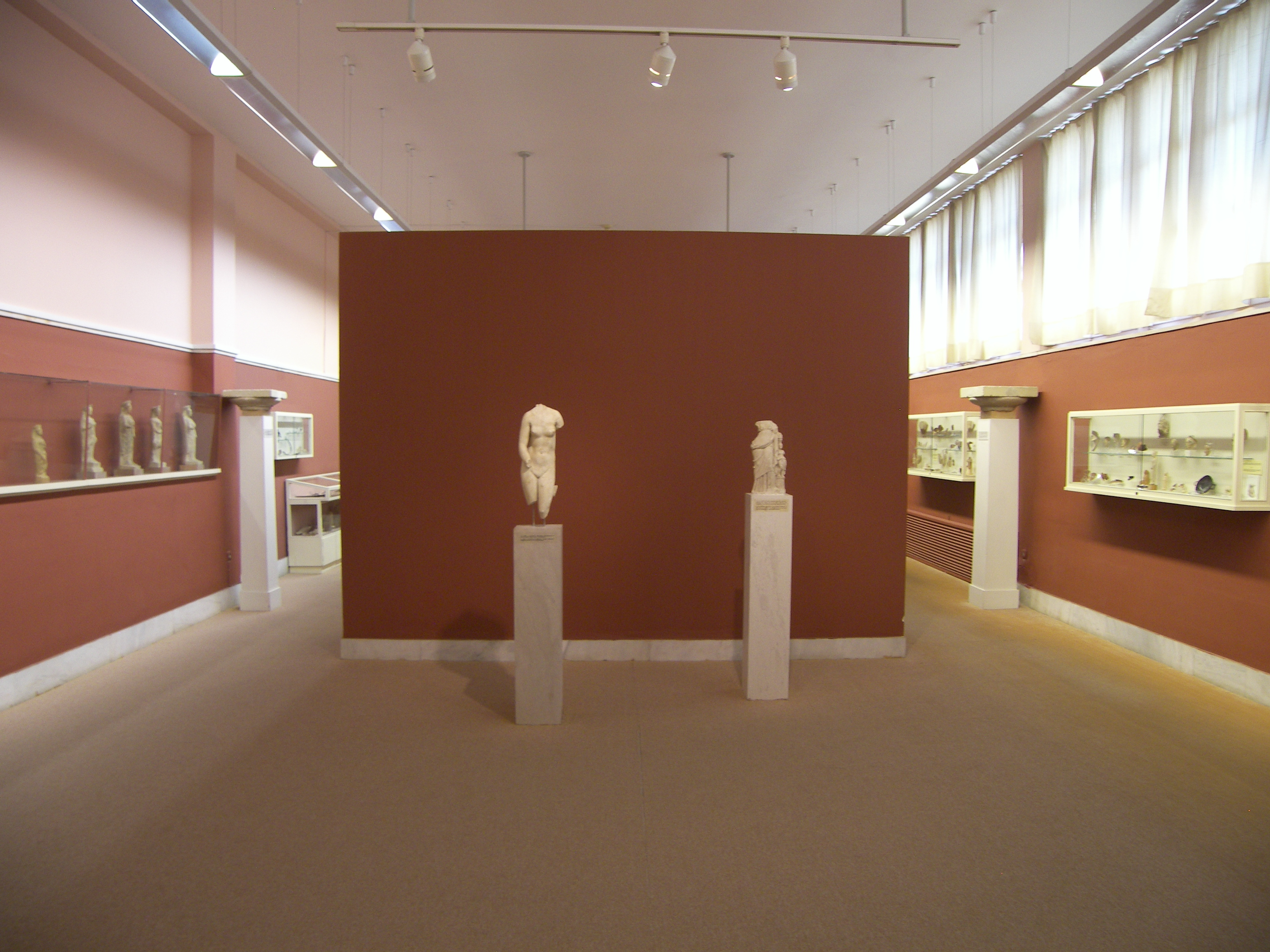
A hall at the museum

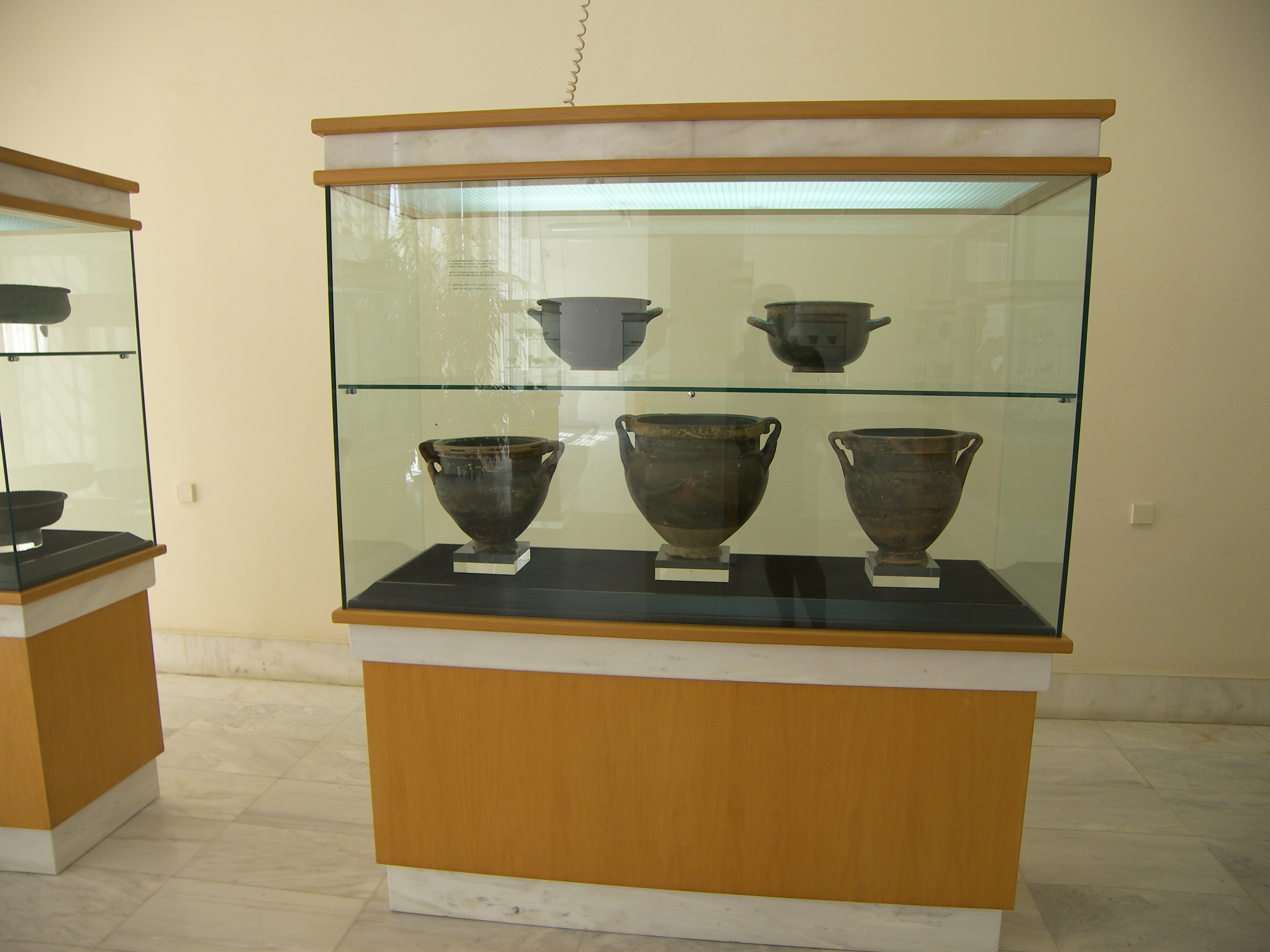
A collection of vases

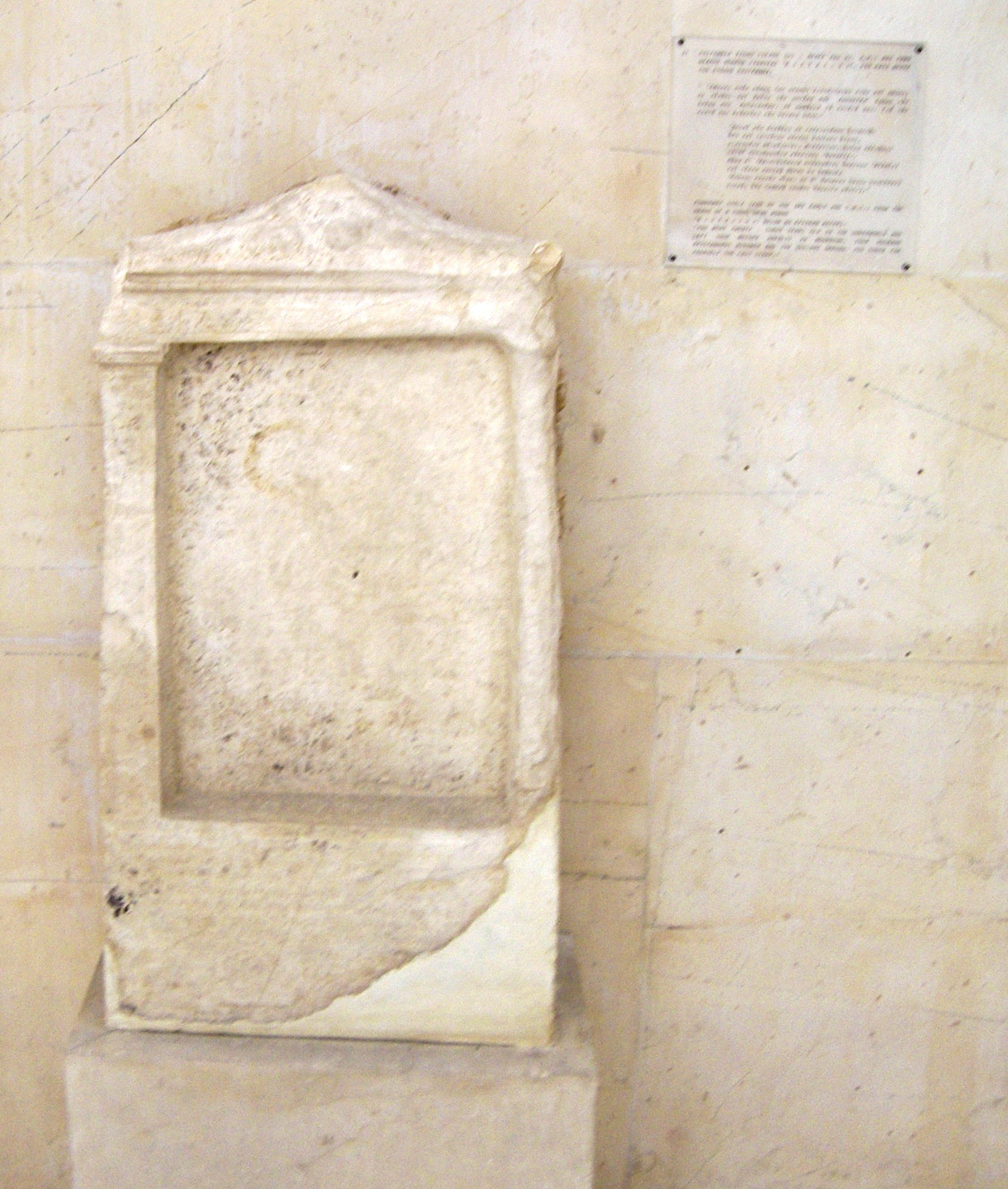
Funerary stele with inscription: You went twenty three years old in the underworld and left your mother Arpalis in mourning, your husband Aristandros widower and the children orphan. You chose for yourself the last sleep.

== See also ==
- List of museums in Greece
