= Stele of Arniadas =

Archaic stele in Corfu, Greece

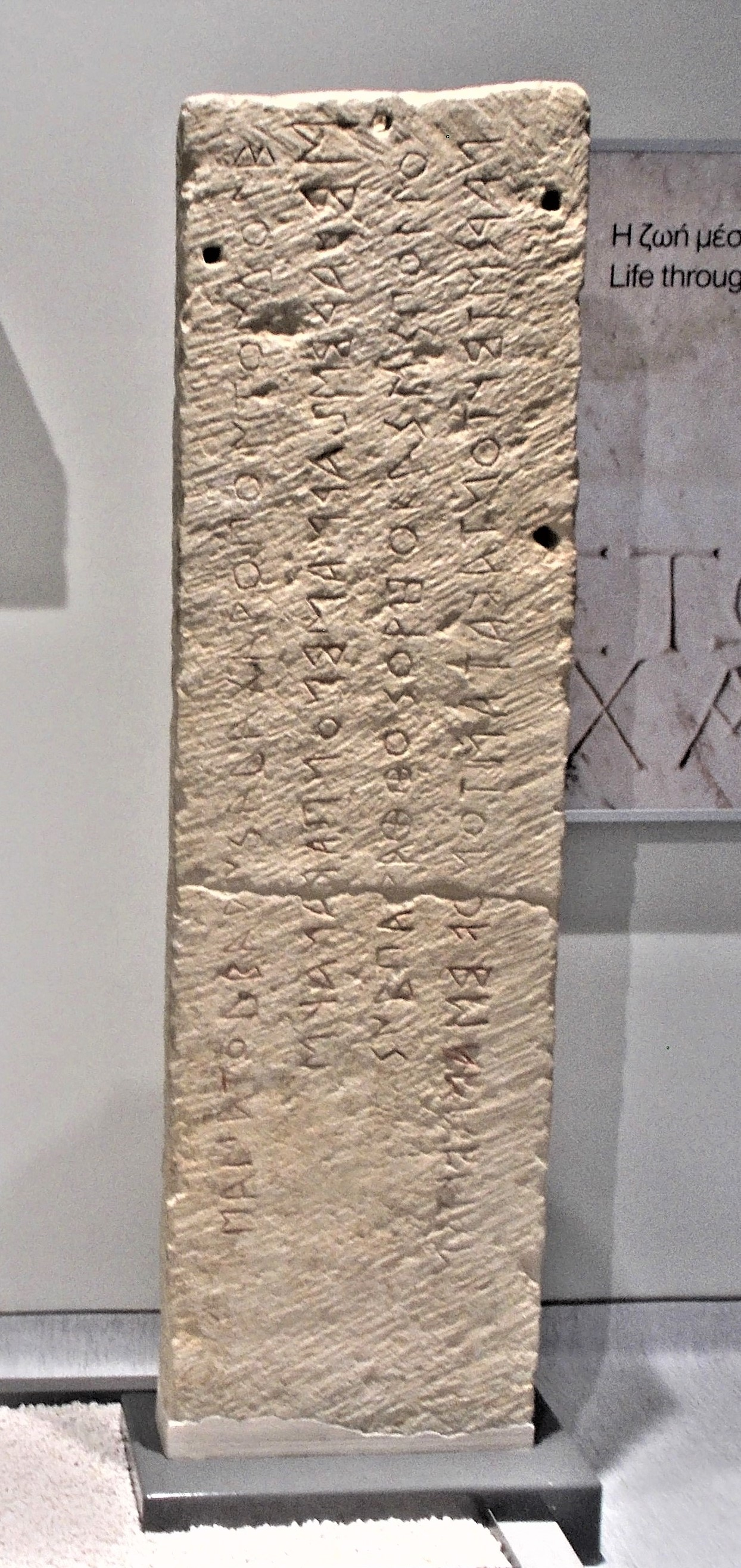
- Material: Limestone
- Height: 1.9 meters
- Width: 55 cm
- Created: c. 550 BC
- Discovered: 1846; Ionian Islands, Greece
- Present location: Corfu, Ionian Islands, Greece

The Stele of Arniadas is an Archaic-period funerary stele in Corfu, Greece, found on the tomb of Arniadas, a warrior. It was intended to mark his grave and honour his memory by enumerating his bravery in a battle near the river Arachthos in the location of ancient Ambracia, modern-day Arta. The stele was found in 1846 at the necropolis of the Corfu Palaiopolis in the suburb of Garitsa, near the Tomb of Menecrates, after a demolition of Venetian fortifications in the area by the British, who at the time ruled Corfu. The date of the stele is early 6th century BC.

The stele bears an epigram written vertically in verses following an alternating direction writing style called boustrophedon. The inscription describes the details of the death of warrior Arniadas in a battle near ships on the banks of the river Arachthos and praises the dead warrior's bravery. The Homeric hexameter of the verses, the proximity of the battle to ships, and the pompous style of the writing are clear indications that the inscription was influenced by the writings of Homer. Such inscriptions were common for that era, and exist in other funerary inscriptions in Corfu of that time. The Stele of Arniadas is exhibited at the Archaeological Museum of Corfu.

== Discovery and description ==
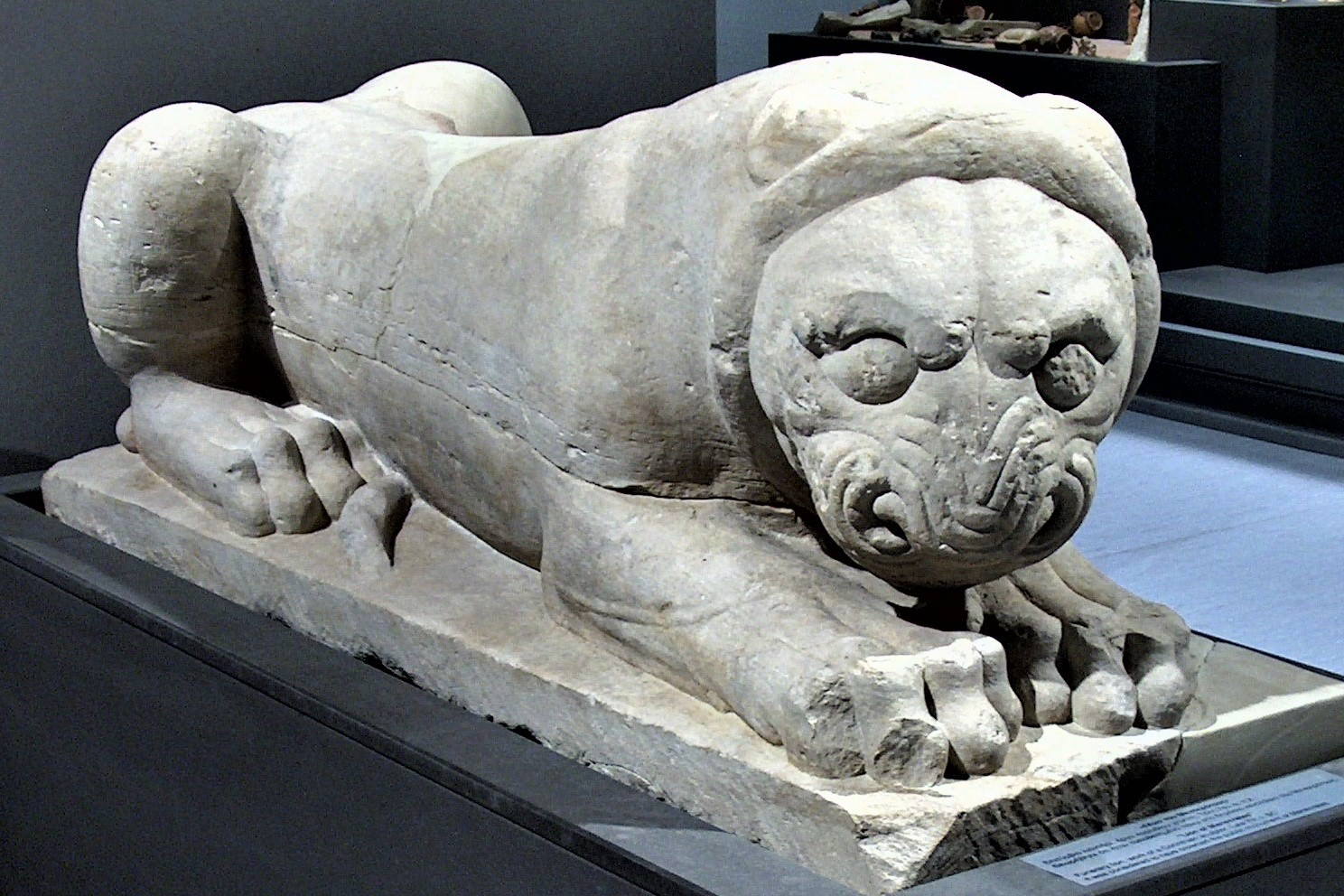
The funerary Lion of Menecrates found near his tomb and originally thought to belong to his cenotaph, may have belonged to the tomb of Arniadas.

The stele was found in 1846 at the necropolis of the Corfu Palaiopolis, in the suburb of Garitsa, near the Tomb of Menecrates, after a demolition of the Venetian-era fortifications in the area by the British, who at the time ruled Corfu. The stele has been dated to the early 6th century BC. It is 0.55 m wide and 1.90 m high and made of limestone. The four holes on the stone functioned as lifting points, assisting in the process of lifting the stele and placing it on the tomb. There is also speculation that the Lion of Menecrates, found near his tomb, may actually belong to the tomb of Arniadas.

== Inscription ==
There is an ancient inscription on the stele. It is written in boustrophedon, a writing system with text alternating in reading direction in each successive line. The inscription contains four verses written in Homeric hexameter, and it is written vertically.

The inscription reads as follows:

Σᾶμα τόδε Ἀρνιάδα· χαροπὸς τόνδ᾿ ὤλεσεν Ἄρες / βαρνάμενον παρὰ ναυσὶν ἐπ᾿ Ἀράθθοιο ρhοϝαῖσι, / πολλὸν ἀριστεύ{τ}οντα κατὰ στονόϝεσ(σ)αν ἀϝυτάν.

The ancient inscription translates as:

This is the sign of Arniadas who was destroyed by fiery-eyed Ares fighting close to the ships on [river] Arachthos's flows, greatly excelling in the uproar of the battle that brings lament.

== Analysis of the inscription ==
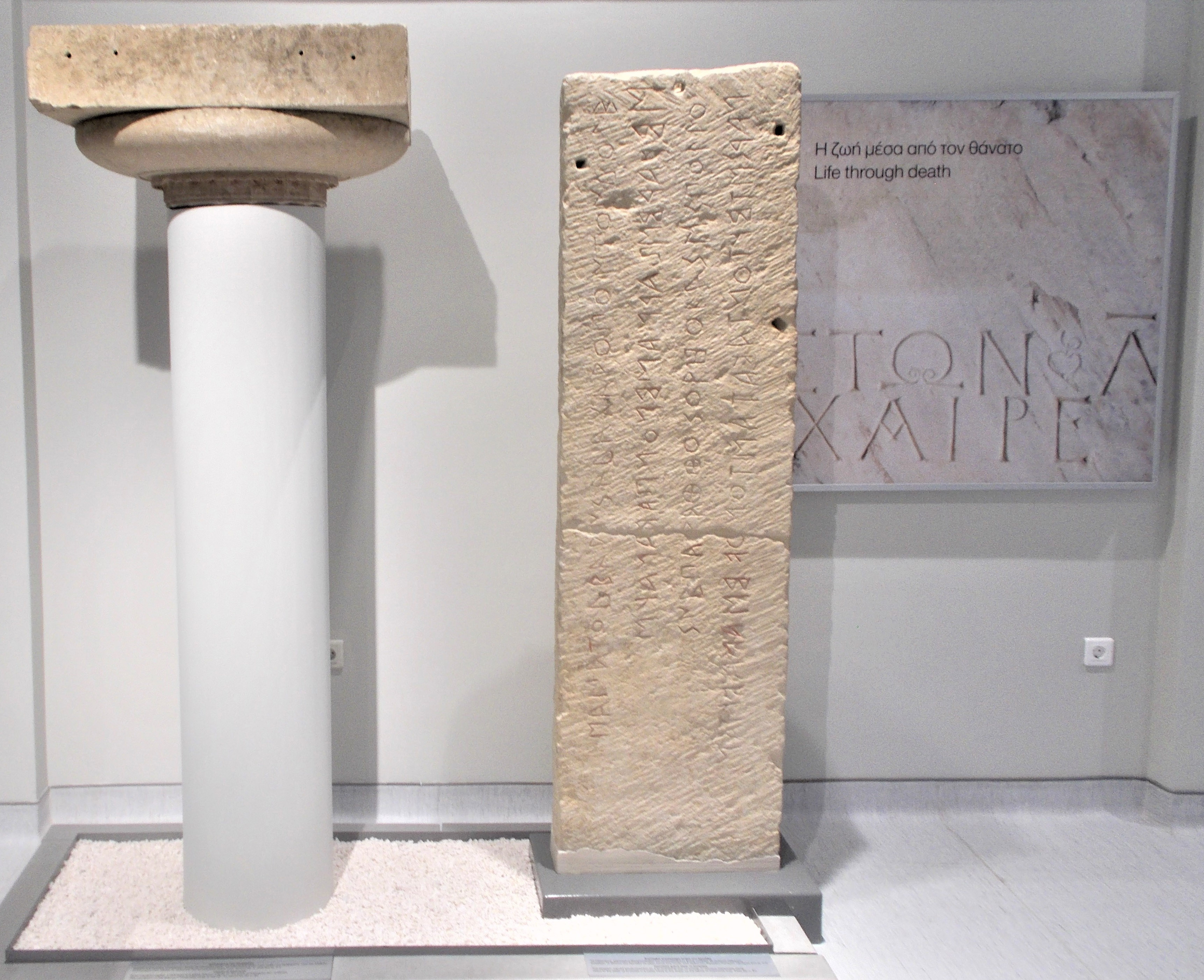
The display of the Stele of Arniadas at the Corfu Archaeological Museum

Scholars have analysed the epigram and have found clear Homeric influence. A. Petrovic states that the inscription has been "directly influenced" by a passage from the Iliad. The high style of the inscription and the epic attributes of the verses indicate that there was a competition among epigram writers aiming at making their inscriptions and monuments distinctive. Grave epigrams of soldiers during the archaic and classical periods follow the structure of Hector's words in the Iliad. The characteristics of Hector's message include a varying sequence of the designation "Τόδε σῆμα" (Ionian form ("This sign/marker/monument")) or "Τόδε σᾶμα" (Doric form) or in reverse order "Σᾶμα τόδε" etc., and the possessive form (genitive) of the name of the warrior, followed by the description of the warrior's bravery as excellent (ἀριστεύοντα), and brief details of his death. A number of academics have used Arniadas's inscription as an example which follows the Homeric formula. Hans-Martin Lumpp is considered the first scholar to suggest that Arniadas's epigram was directly related to Hector's words in the Iliad. Anthony Raubitschek states that the verses are "extraordinarily similar" to the pronouncements of Hector. Paul Friedländer and Herbert B. Hoffleit describe the epigram as "the masterpiece among...sepulchral [epigrams] in epic manner".

There is a difference between the death of Arniadas and that of Menecrates as evidenced by the inscriptions on their tombs. Arniadas's death appears heroic since he was slain by Ares himself, the god of war, while Menecrates was simply lost at sea. There is also uncertainty about the term "χαροπός" ("Charopos" (bright-eyed)), a fact that makes the exact syntactic analysis of the epigram challenging. It is unclear if Arniadas is the son of Charops, or vice versa, or even if Charops is a member of a group called Arniadai. Also, "χαροπός" is not used as an adjective for the god of war Ares in epic poetry. The latter makes the epigram's connection to the Homeric epics tenuous. The inscription is described as having a "grand epic style" which "all but transports [Arniadas] to the Island of the Blessed", without providing any details of the dead warrior's life before he died fighting.
