= Aristodemus (actor) =

Aristodemus (Ancient Greek: Ἀριστόδημος) was a tragic actor of Athens in the 4th century BCE. He took a prominent part in the political affairs of his time, and belonged to the political movement who believed peace with Macedonia was imperative. Demosthenes therefore treats him as a traitor to his country. He was employed by the Athenians in their negotiations with Philip II of Macedon, who was fond of him on account of his acting, and made use of him for his own purposes.

There was a tragic actor of the same name at Syracuse in the time of the First Punic War.
