= Aristides of Thebes =

4th-century BC Greek painter

Aristides of Thebes (Ancient Greek: Ἀριστείδης ὁ Θηβαῖος) was an ancient Greek painter.

== Life ==
He lived in the 4th century BC. He had a reputation for expressiveness: for example, a picture of his representing a dying mother's fear lest her infant should suck death from her breast became celebrated. He also painted one of Alexander the Great's battles. King Attalus of Pergamon allegedly bought one of his pictures for 100 talents.

The painter Ariston was his son and pupil.
