= Syllogae minores =

Small collections of Greek epigrams

Syllogae minores (i.e. "minor collections") is a term used in literature to describe small collections of Greek epigrams, which are part of the so-called Greek Anthology, the collection of Greek epigrams. The term "Syllogae" comes from the Greek word "Συλλογαί" (collections), while the term "minores" (minor) is used to distinguish them from the large and important collections of Palatine Anthology and the Anthology of Planudes. Some of these collections are important because of the epigrams which contain some not found in any of the other collections, while others are highly dependent on known sources, mainly of the Anthology of Planudes.

== Collections ==
The following collections are part of "Syllogae minores" (the abbreviation Syll. is used for the word Sylloge – from the Greek word Συλλογή which means collection):

- Sylloge S (known as Sylloge Parisina): 118 epigrams, Paris. Suppl. 352, 13th century (published by Cramer, An. Par. 4.365), also in abridged form in Par. gr. 1630 (mid 14th century)
- Sylloge L (Laurentiana): 169 epigrams, by Maximus Planudes (about 1280, 20 years before the edition of his Anthology). Saved in various manuscripts in abridged editions. In its fullest form it is found in codex Laur. 32.16 (autograph by Maximus Planudes).
- Sylloge E, also mentioned in the past as Sylloge Euphemiana, named after the person to whom two poems of the collection were dedicated to, 82 epigrams, three manuscripts (16th century): Codex Parisinus 2720 (published by Schneidewin, at Progymn. in Anth. Gr. Goettingen 1855), is the main source. The other two manuscripts are Parisinus 1773 and Laur. 57.29 (published by Stadtmueller) and are dependent from the first codex (Paris. 27270).
- Sylloge Σ^{π}: 58 epigrams written on the blank pages of Palatine Anthology (in the beginning, at the end and in some intermediate pages). The content of this collection is to a large extent the same as that of Syll.E.
- Appendix B.-V. or ABV (Appendix Barberino-Vaticana), 56 (or 54) erotic epigrams, transmitted via three manuscripts: Vat. Barb. gr. 123, Vat. gr. 240 and Par. Suppl. gr. 1199 (16th century), (published by L. Sternbach, Anth. Plan. Appendix Barberino-Vaticana (Leipsig 1890) ( and )
- Sylloge I, contains 17 epigrams found in codex Vat. Pal. gr. 128 (first half of the 15th century)
- Sylloge H, five manuscripts which have a total of 24 epigrams. In each manuscript there is a different number of epigrams.
- Sylloge S contains 121 epigrams. It is found together with Syll. E in codex Par. gr. 1773, and in Laur. 57.29.
- Sylloge T, with 45 epigrams found in Vindobonensis Phil. gr. 311 (late 15th century)
- Sylloge F, fifty-two epigrams: Laurentianus Gr. 91 sup. 8 ff. 1–6 (16th century) (systematically identical to the corresponding epigrams of the Anthology of Planudes)
- Sylloge O, 31 epigrams by the Anthology of Planudes found in Laur. 32.50 (15th–16th centuries)
- Sylloge K, 19 or 24 epigrams (20 exist in the Palatine Anthology and the Anthology of Planudes, one in the Anthology of Planudes and three which do not exist in any of the two), based on the Anthology of Planudes, from manuscripts: Laurentianus Gr. 59.44 ff. 235–239 and Marc. gr. XI.15 and Vat. gr. 1404
- Sylloge G, 33 epigrams also found in the Anthology of Planudes, found in Code Par. Suppl. gr. 455 (15th–16th centuries)

== Bibliography ==
- Francesca Maltomini, Tradizione antologica dell'epigramma greco. Le Sillogi Minori di età bizantina e umanistica. (Pleiadi 9.), Rome: Edizioni di Storia e Letteratura, 2008, ISBN 978-88-8498-480-7.

== Further bibliography ==
- The Greek anthology : from Meleager to Planudes, Alan Cameron, Oxford : Clarendon Press; New York : Oxford University Press, 1993, chapt. VII. The Syllogae Minores
