= Ariston (painter) =

4th-century BC Greek painter

Ariston (fl. 4th century BC) was a painter of Ancient Greece. He was the son and pupil of Aristeides of Thebes. He is known to have painted a satyr holding a goblet and crowned with a garland. Antorides and Euphranor were his disciples.
