= Aristodemus of Nysa the Elder =

Ancient Greek grammarian

Aristodemus (Ancient Greek: Ἀριστόδημος) of Nysa in Caria, was a son of Menecrates (though it is unclear which Menecrates), and a pupil of the celebrated grammarian, Aristarchus of Samothrace. He himself was a celebrated grammarian, and Strabo in his youth was a pupil of Aristodemus at Nysa, who was by then an old man. It is not improbable that the Aristodemus whom the Scholiast on Pindar calls an "Alexandrian", is the same as this Aristodemus, who must have resided for some time at Alexandria while under the tutelage of Aristarchus, who was the head librarian at the library of Alexandria.

He is the older relative of Aristodemus of Nysa the Younger.
