= Menecrates (sculptor) =

Sculptor in ancient Greek

Menecrates (/məˈnɛkrətiːz/; Ancient Greek: Μενεκράτης) was an ancient Greek sculptor who flourished during the 2nd century BC. Little is known about him except that, according to Pliny the Elder, he was the teacher of Apollonius of Tralles and Tauriscus, the sculptors (also according to Pliny) of the Farnese Bull.
