= Aristodemus of Thebes =

Aristodemus (Ancient Greek: Ἀριστόδημος) of Thebes was a writer of ancient Greece who wrote a work on his native city titled On Thebes (Ancient Greek: Θηβαϊκά). This work is often referred to by ancient authors, and appears to have dealt mostly with the antiquities of Thebes. An extended quote of the second book of this work is found in the Byzantine encyclopedia known as the Suda.
