= Aristodemus of Nysa the Younger =

Aristodemus (Ancient Greek: Ἀριστόδημος) of Nysa in Caria distinguished himself as a grammarian and rhetorician, and is mentioned among the instructors of Pompey the Great. During the earlier period of his life he taught rhetoric at Nysa and Rhodes; in his later years he lived at Rome and instructed the sons of Pompey in grammar.

There exists a historical work (Ancient Greek: ἱστορίαι) attributed to "Aristodemus of Nysa", the first book of which is quoted by Parthenius of Nicaea, but whether it was the work of the elder or the younger Aristodemus, and what was the subject of it, is not known.

He is the younger relative (Ancient Greek: ἀνεψιός) of Aristodemus of Nysa the Elder.
