= Amaranth (disambiguation) =

Amaranth is a common name for the plants in the genus Amaranthus.

Amaranth, Amaranthe, or Amaranthus may also refer to:

== Arts and media ==
=== Music ===
- Amaranth (song), a 2007 song by Finnish symphonic metal band Nightwish
- Amaranth (album), a 2008 album by Davichi
- Amaranthe, a Swedish power metal/melodic death metal band
- Amaranthe (album), a 2011 album by the band Amaranthe
- Amaranthus (album), a 2016 album by Momoiro Clover Z

=== Other media ===
- Amaranth Games, now Aveyond Studios, developer of the Aveyond series of video games
- Amaranth, a series of role-playing games for the PC-98
- Amaranth, a class of immortals featured in the Jack Vance novel To Live Forever

== Colors ==
- Amaranth (color), a bright reddish rose color
- Amaranth (dye), a dye used for coloring food (E123, FD&C Red No. 2), now banned by the US Food and Drug Administration

== Organizations ==
- Amaranth Advisors, a defunct American hedge fund firm
- Order of the Amaranth, a Masonic-affiliated organization

== Places ==
- Amaranth, Manitoba, a town in Canada
- Amaranth, Ontario, a township in Ontario, Canada
- Amarante, Portugal, a town in Northern Portugal

== Plants ==
- Amaranth grain, the edible grains of the amaranth genus
- Gomphrena or globe amaranth, a genus of plants in the family Amaranthaceae
- Peltogyne, a genus of tropical trees that produce lumber called "amaranth wood"

== Ships ==
- Amaranth (barquentine), 1901 4-masted ship in the China trade
- HMS Amaranthe, a list of ships that share the name
- USLHT Amaranth, schooner-rigged, twin-screw, wooden-hulled lighthouse tender that served in both World Wars
- USS Amaranthus (1864), screw steamer used by US Navy as a tugboat in the blockade of Confederate waterways

== See also ==
- Amouranth (born 1993), an Internet celebrity
- Amarante (disambiguation)
- Amaranthine (disambiguation)
- Amarantus of Alexandria (1st century AD), ancient Greek writer
- Amarnath (disambiguation)
