= Amar =

Amar may refer to:

== People ==
=== Given name ===
- Amar (British singer) (born 1982), British Indian singer born Amar Dhanjal
- Amar (Lebanese singer) (born 1986), born Amar Mahmoud Al Tahech
- Amar Bose (1929–2013), Founder of Bose Corporation
- Amar Gupta (born 1953), Indian computer scientist
- Amar Khan, Pakistani director, writer and television actress
- Amar Sakhri, Algerian politician
- Amar Singh (disambiguation)
- Amar Talwar (born 1949), Bollywood and Television actor
- Amar Upadhyay (born 1972), Indian Television actor

=== Surname ===
- Akhil Amar (born 1958), American professor of law at Yale
- Anandyn Amar (1886-1941), Mongolian politician
- David Amar (1920–2000), Moroccan Jewish businessman
- Jean-Pierre-André Amar (1755–1816), politician in the French Revolution
- Jo Amar (1930–2009), Moroccan-Israeli singer
- Larry Amar (1972–2020), American field hockey player
- Licco Amar (1891–1959), Hungarian violinist
- Ludu Daw Amar (1915–2008), Burmese writer from Mandalay
- Shlomo Amar (born 1948), the Sephardi Chief Rabbi of Israel
- Vikram Amar (born c. 1963), American professor of law at UC Davis
- Sumit Amar (born c. 1980), American computer scientist and engineering leader

== Places ==
- Amar, India, a village in Gujarat
- Amar al-Husn, a village in Homs Governorate, Syria
- Amar (1), Kerman, a village in Iran
- Amar (2), Kerman, a village in Iran
- Amar (3), Kerman, a village in Iran
- Amar, Lorestan, or Ammar, a village in Iran

== Entertainment ==
- Amar (1954 film), a Hindi-language Indian film
- Amar (2017 film), a Spanish film
- Amar (2019 film), a Kannada-language Indian film
- Amar (album), by BigXthaPlug
- "Amar" (song), a song by 2B, which represented Portugal in the Eurovision Song Contest 2005
- Amar, a Klingon battlecruiser in Star Trek: The Motion Picture
- Amar Saxena, fictional police officer in the 1994 Indian film Mohra, played by Akshay Kumar
- Amar Manohar, fictional character in the 1994 Indian film Andaz Apna Apna, played by Aamir Khan

== See also ==
- Ammar (name)
- Amara (disambiguation)
- Ammar (disambiguation)
- Amarnath (disambiguation)
- Amaran (disambiguation)
- Chiranjivi, immortal (amara in Sanskrit) beings in Hinduism
