= Artemidoros =

The name Artemidoros or Artemidorus (Ancient Greek: Ἀρτεμίδωρος) may refer to:

- Artemidorus Aristophanius (fl. 3rd century BCE), Greek grammarian
- Artemidorus (physician) (2nd/3rd century BCE), physician
- Artemidorus of Ascalon, ancient historian who wrote on Bithynia
- Artemidorus Cornelius (fl. 1st century BCE), Greek physician serving the Roman legate Gaius Verres
- Artemidorus Ephesius (fl. 100 BCE), geographer from Ephesus
- Artemidoros Aniketos (c. 100–80 BCE), Indo-Greek king
- Artemidorus of Daldis (2nd century CE), diviner and author of the Oneirocritica
- Artemidorus of Knidos (fl. 100 BCE), historical figure from Knidos
- Artemidorus of Megara, a philosopher, who, according to the Lives and Opinions of Eminent Philosophers (9.53) wrote a work against Chrysippus
- Artemidorus, the son-in-law of the philosopher Gaius Musonius Rufus and a philosopher himself, praised by his friend Pliny the Younger in his Epistulae (3.11)
- Artemidorus of Parion, astronomer whose views were described in Seneca's Naturales quaestiones (1.4, 7.13)
- Artemidorus of Tarsus, an ancient grammarian whose works are sometimes confused with those of Artemidorus Aristophanius
- Artemidorus of Tralles, victor of the 69 CE Olympic games at the Pankration
- Artemidorus, a painter who lived at the end of the 1st century CE, mentioned by Martial in his Epigrams (5.40), but who is otherwise entirely unknown.
- Artemidorus of Thyateira, winner of the Stadion race at the 193rd Olympiad in 8 BCE
- Artemidorus (commentator on the Almagest) (fl. c. 200 CE), astronomer
- Artemidorus Capito (3rd century CE), Greek physician
