= Hémard =

Hémard is a French surname. In old records, this family name may have phonetic transcription variations, such as Aimart, Emar, or Eimar. Notable people with the surname include:

- Jean Hémard (died 1933), French film director
- Joseph Hémard (1880–1961), French artist
- Urbain Hémard (1548–1592), French physician

== See also ==
- Charles de Hémard de Denonville (1493–1540), French bishop and cardinal
- Émard
