= Ammar (name) =

- Pronunciation: Arabic: [ˈʕamˌmaːr]
- Gender: Male
- Language: Arabic, Sanskrit

Origin
- Origin: Arabic, Sanskrit
- Meaning: "long-lived," "one who builds," or "pious and virtuous"

Other names
- Alternative spelling: Amar, Amer

Ammar (also spelled Amar; Arabic: عمّار, ʿAmmār) is an Arabic masculine given name, and a surname. Notable people with this name include:

== Given name ==
- Ammar Bakdash (1954–2025), Syrian politician and economist
- Ammar al-Bakri, British-Iraqi lawyer
- Ammar al-Basri, 9th-century East Syriac Christian theologian
- Ammar Campa-Najjar (born 1989), California Congressional candidate
- Amar Ezzahi (1941–2016), Algerian singer
- Amar Gegić (born 1998), Bosnian basketball player
- Ammar Habib (born 1967), Syrian footballer
- Ammar al-Hakim (born 1971), Iraqi politician
- Ammar Hassan (born 1976), Palestinian musician
- Amar Jaleel (born 1936), Pakistani writer
- Ammar Jemal (born 1987), Tunisian footballer
- Amar Lal, Pakistani politician
- Ammar Nakshawani (born 1981), Islamic lecturer
- Amar Osim (born 1967), Bosnian football coach
- Amar Ramasar (born 1981), American ballet dancer
- Ammar Rihawi (born 1975), Syrian football coach
- Ammar al-Saffar (born 1956), Iraqi politician
- Ammar Siamwalla (1939–2025), Thai economist

== Surname ==
- Ali Ammar (1930–1957), Algerian guerilla leader
- Ali Ammar (born 1956), Lebanese politician
- Ali Ammar, Canadian actor
- Michael Ammar (born 1956), American magician
- Sonia Ben Ammar (born 1999), Tunisian-French model and singer
- Tarak Ben Ammar (born 1949), Tunisian-French film producer

== See also ==
- Amar (disambiguation)
- Amar, Lorestan, or Ammar, a village in Iran
