= Emar (disambiguation) =

Emar is an archaeological site in the Aleppo Governorate of northern Syria.

Emar may also refer to:

- Emar Acosta (1900–1965), Argentinian lawyer
- Juan Emar (1893–1964), Chilean writer, artist and critic
- Emar Lakes Provincial Park, Provincial park in British Columbia, Canada
- Emar Matha, Indian matha
- e-MAR, electronic Medication Administration Record
- A historical phonetic transcription of the family name Hémard

== See also ==
- Amar
- Ammar
- Emmar
- Émard
