= UMAA =

UMAA may refer to:

- University of Michigan-Ann Arbor, a public university in Ann Arbor, Michigan
- Universal Muslim Association of America, a 501(c)(3) organization incorporated in Lutherville, Maryland
