= Amhara =

Amhara may refer to:

- Amhara people, an ethnic group of Ethiopia
- Amharic, a language spoken by the Amhara people
- Bete Amhara, a lordship and later province of medieval Ethiopia
- Amhara Province, a historical region of Ethiopia
- Amhara Region, an administrative region of modern Ethiopia
- Amhara, Bihar, India
- Amhara, a subdivision of the former Italian East Africa

== See also ==
- Amara (disambiguation)
- Amroha, Uttar Pradesh, India
