= Eymard =

Eymard is a French given name and a surname, a variant of Émard. Notable people with the name include:

- Eymard Corbin, Canadian retired Senator
- Eymard Temby (1911–1990), Australian religious sister and educator
- Luiz Eymard Coelho, or Luiz Zech (born 1949), Brazilian volleyball player
- Peter Julian Eymard (1811–1868), French priest and saint

== See also ==
- Eymar
