= Promontorium Sacrum =

Promontorium Sacrum or Sacrum Promontorium (Latin for "Holy Promontory") may refer to:

- Cap Corse, in France
- Cape St. Vincent, in Portugal
- Carnsore Point, in Ireland
- Crimea, in Ukraine
- Kilidonia, in Turkey
- Sagres Point, in Portugal

== See also ==
- Sacrum § Promontory, part of the human body
- Sacred promontory, other promontories considered sacred
