= Kutiyana =

- City
- Location in Gujarat, India Kutiyana (India)
- Coordinates: 21.63°N 69.98°E
- Country: India
- State: Gujarat
- District: Porbandar
- Elevation: 30 m (98 ft)

Population (2001)
  - Total: 17,108

Languages
  - Official: Gujarati, Hindi
- Time zone: UTC+5:30 (IST)
- PIN: 362650
- Telephone code: 02804
- Vehicle registration: GJ-25
- Website: gujaratindia.com

Kutiyana is a city and a municipality in Porbandar district in the Indian state of Gujarat. It is situated on the banks of the Bhadar River.

== History ==
The name of the town is supposedly derived from a Charan lady named Kunti, who established a nes (hamlet) at the location which grew into a village called Kuntiyana, later corrupted to Kutiyana. From a village, Kutiyana developed into a town.

Kutiyana was the home of poets Bhat Rao Lakhan, Sorathi Sarasvat Vaikunath, Kshatri Mardash Bhagat, Bhat Thakardas, and Bhat Bhupatsingh.

Due to its strategic importance in the medieval period being on the main road to Porbandar-Barda and on the boundaries of Ghed and hill regions, the city of Kutiyana has seen many sieges and battles in its history.

Kutiyana also came to be known as Muzafarabad by the Muslims because it is believed that Muzafar Halim, governor of Saurashtra, made it very popular and built a fort around the town. In contemporary Persian records, the town was named as such. In an inscription of Jamamasjid dated 1539 AD, it is stated that one Ibrahim Nizam Zermi build a mosque there.

In 1730-1740, Kalidas, a baniya of Ahmedabad and an official of Vasantray Purabia, built a citadel called Kalikothi in the town.

After the partition of India, displaced Hindu migrants from Pakistan were settled here in place of the Muslim population who chose to migrate to Pakistan.

Kutiyana is also the original home of Mahatma Gandhi, whose family held barkhali lands in the town.

== Geography ==
Kutiyana is located at 21.63°N 69.98°E. It has an average elevation of 30 metres (98 feet). Kutiyana town is spread over almost a 2 km range on the banks of the Bhadar River. Kutiyana is around 42 km away from its district center, Porbandar, and 40 km away from Airport. Kutiyana taluka has 52 villages.

== Demographics ==
As of 2001, Kutiyana had a population of 17,108. Males constituted 51% of the population and females 49%. Kutiyana had an average literacy rate of 63%, higher than the national average of 59.5%: male literacy was 71%, and female literacy was 54%. In Kutiyana, 13% of the population was under 6 years of age.

== Towns and villages ==
- Amar
- Kansabad
- Katvana
- Mandva
- Khageshri, India
