= Sacred promontory =

Sacred promontory or sacred cape or holy promontory or cape was a name assigned by the ancient Greeks and Romans to salient promontories extending into large bodies of water at strategic locations, typically containing a temple to the god of the sea. The English translates Latin sacrum promunturium and ancient Greek ἱερὸν ἀκρωτήριον (hieron akrōtērion).

Some sacred promontories were:

- Cap Corse, northern Corsica
- Cape Fiolente, Crimea (vicinity of Sevastopol)
- Cape Gelidonya, southern coast of Turkey
- Cape Kyllini, located in Kastro-Kyllini, Elis, Greece
- Cape St. Vincent, southern Portugal
- Holyhead, Wales
- Carnsore Point, or possibly Hook Head, Wexford, Ireland
- Pallene, Chalcidice, northern Aegean Sea
- Sagres Point, southern Portugal
- Sounion, near Athens
- Triopium promontorium in Turkey

== See also ==
- Promontorium Sacrum (disambiguation)
