= Ammar Nakshawani =

Shia scholar (born 1981)

Sayed Sayed Ammar Nakshawani
- عمار النقشواني (Arabic); Əmmar Nəqşəvani (Azerbaijani)
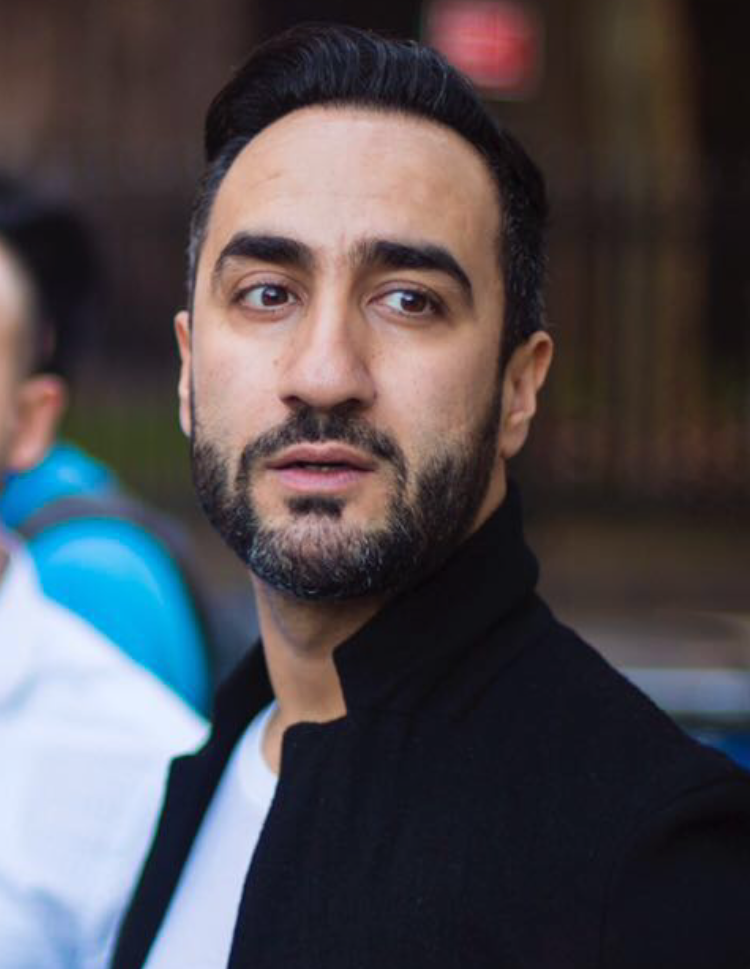
- Nakshawani in 2016
- Born: 1981 (age 44–45); Iraq
- Other name: SAN
- Occupations: Scholar, author, lecturer
- Years active: 2003–present
- Known for: Shia Voice platform, interfaith dialogue, contemporary Shia thought
- Title: Imam Ali Chair for Shia Studies (Hartford Seminary); Visiting Scholar, Columbia University

Academic background
- Education: University College London (BSc); Shahid Beheshti University (MA); University of Exeter (PhD)
- Influences: Abu al-Qasim al-Khoei, Sayyid al-Sistani, Baqir al-Irawani

Academic work
- Region: Middle East, Western Europe, North America
- Institutions: Hartford Seminary
- Notable works: The 14 Infallibles; Islam - Liberté, égalité, fraternité The Ten Granted Paradise
- Influenced: Ruhool Kawa
- Website: sayedammar.com

Sayed Ammar Nakshawani (Arabic: عمار النقشواني; Azerbaijani: Əmmar Nəqşəvani; born 1981) is a British-Iraqi Shia scholar, author and public lecturer of Azerbaijani descent. He is recognized for his contributions to Islamic history, theology, and inter-sectarian dialogue. In 2022, he launched Shia Voice, a digital platform designed to promote Shia teachings and facilitate engagement with younger audiences through lectures, discussions, and online media. The platform aims to provide accessible religious education, encourage thoughtful reflection, and foster a sense of community among Shia Muslims worldwide.

Nakshawani has delivered lectures at numerous academic institutions and interfaith forums globally. He is noted for addressing contemporary issues facing Muslim youth while advocating for unity and dialogue across sectarian lines. His work has garnered both praise for its clarity and accessibility and some criticism from those who call for greater scholarly rigor.

Nakshawani was listed among The 500 Most Influential Muslims in 2014. He served as a visiting scholar at Columbia University's Middle East Institute and previously held the Imam Ali Chair for Shia Studies and Dialogue among Islamic Legal Schools at Hartford Seminary. He has lectured extensively at universities and institutions around the world, including Oxford University, Cambridge University, and the University of California, Los Angeles (UCLA), as well as at international conferences on interfaith dialogue, counter-extremism, and Islamic ethics.

== Early life and education ==
Nakshawani was born in 1981 into a religious family originally from Najaf, Iraq, known for its longstanding scholarly tradition. His grandfather, Murtadha Nakshawani, served as a representative of Grand Ayatollah Abu al-Qasim al-Khoei, one of the most influential Shia marjas of the 20th century. The Nakshawani family migrated to the United Kingdom in 1987, where Ammar was raised amidst a blend of traditional religious and Western educational influences.

From an early age, Nakshawani was exposed to classical Islamic teachings through his family's seminary background while also pursuing formal academic studies. He completed his undergraduate studies in Islamic history at the University of London, where he developed a foundation in critical historical methods and classical Islamic thought. Seeking to deepen his expertise, he undertook doctoral research at the University of Exeter, earning a PhD in Islamic intellectual thought. His doctoral work focused on the development of religious authority and leadership in early Islamic history, combining rigorous textual analysis with contemporary theoretical frameworks.

Alongside his university education, Nakshawani pursued traditional seminary studies in the religious centers of Qom in Iran, and Najaf in Iraq. These studies provided him with comprehensive training in Islamic jurisprudence, theology, and philosophy, enabling him to bridge classical Shia scholarship with modern academic approaches. This dual background has shaped his scholarly and public engagement style, allowing him to communicate complex religious concepts to diverse audiences. His uncle, Baqir al-Irawani is an Iraqi Islamic jurist and teacher at the Islamic seminary of Najaf. In 1987, his family migrated to England.

== Academic career ==
In 2013, Nakshawani was appointed to the Imam Ali Chair for Shia Studies and Dialogue Among Islamic Legal Schools at Hartford Seminary in the United States. This position made him one of the first Shia scholars to hold such a role at a Western academic institution. His work there focused on comparative theology, classical Islamic jurisprudence, ethics, and interfaith engagement. He later served as a visiting scholar at Columbia University's Middle East Institute, where he continued research and lecturing on Islamic law, theology, and contemporary religious reform movements.

=== Recognition ===
In 2014, Nakshawani was listed in The 500 Most Influential Muslims, an annual publication profiling prominent figures in the Muslim world in the "Preachers and Spiritual Guides" category. This recognition highlighted his influence as a scholar and public lecturer.

=== Public engagement ===
Nakshawani has delivered lectures at numerous academic institutions, interfaith forums, and religious gatherings worldwide. His public work emphasizes addressing contemporary challenges faced by Muslim youth, promoting unity across sectarian lines, and encouraging thoughtful religious reflection. His accessible style has gained praise, though some critics call for greater academic rigor in parts of his outreach.

== International work and initiatives ==
Nakshawani has delivered lectures and keynote addresses at religious, academic, and interfaith forums across Europe, North America, and the Middle East. He served as Special Representative to the United Nations for the Universal Muslim Association of America (UMAA), contributing research on global peacebuilding, minority rights, and religious tolerance.

=== Shia Voice platform ===
In an effort to increase accessibility to Shia religious discourse, Nakshawani founded Shia Voice, a media platform featuring lectures, reflections on Islamic history, and discussions on theology and ethics. The channel has grown a substantial online following, and it remains a cornerstone of his outreach.

== Publications ==
Nakshawani has written books and essays addressing the lives of the Twelve Imams, Islamic leadership, spiritual ethics, and historical narratives within Shia Islam. His works are known for their emphasis on source-based analysis and accessible language for non-specialist audiences.

== Bibliography ==
- Husayn: The Eternal Legacy
- The Fourteen Infallibles: Reflections on the Ahlul Bayt
- Ali: The Elixir of Love
- The Hidden Imam and the Awaited Savior
- Karbala: A Historical and Theological Analysis

== Notable quotes ==
“Karbala is not a memory; it is a mirror. It reflects what we choose to be in every generation.”

“The value of scholarship is not in how much you memorize, but in how deeply you understand the human being.”

== See also ==
- Shia Islam
- Karbala and Ashura
- Najaf Seminary
- Universal Muslim Association of America (UMAA)
