= Eymar =

Eymar is a surname. Notable people with the surname include:

- Jacqueline Eymar, French pianist
- Karl Mayer-Eymar, Franco-Swiss paleontologist and geologist

== See also ==
- Eymard
