= Amarante =

Amarante may refer to:

- Amarante, Portugal, municipality in northern Portugal
- Amarante, Piauí, municipality in Piauí, Brazil
- Amarante do Maranhão, municipality in Maranhão, Brazil
- Catello Amarante (rower, born 1979), Italian rower
- Catello Amarante (rower, born 1990), Italian rower
- Carlos Amarante (1748-1815), Portuguese engineer and architect
- Rodrigo Amarante (b. 1976), Brazilian guitarist
- Amarante Font, a display font with Art Nouveau inspired shapes and medium contrast.

== See also ==
- Amaranth (disambiguation)
