= Arius Didymus =

1st century BCE Greek Stoic philosopher

Arius Didymus (Ancient Greek: Ἄρειος Δίδυμος Areios Didymos; fl. 1st century BC) was a Stoic philosopher and teacher of Augustus. Fragments of his handbooks summarizing Stoic and Peripatetic doctrines are preserved by Stobaeus and by Eusebius of Caesarea.

== Life ==
Arius was a citizen of Alexandria. Areius as well as his two sons, Dionysius and Nicanor, are said to have instructed Augustus himself in philosophy, and Areius for a time resided directly within Augustus's household. He is frequently mentioned by the philosopher Themistius, who says that Augustus valued Areius not less than Marcus Vipsanius Agrippa, who is commonly thought of as Augustus's confidant and right-hand man (though it must be mentioned that Themistius was writing four hundred years after the fact). Augustus esteemed him so highly, that after the conquest of Alexandria, he declared that he spared the city chiefly for the sake of Arius. According to Plutarch, Arius advised Augustus to execute Caesarion, the son of Cleopatra and Julius Caesar, with the words "ouk agathon polukaisarie" ("it is not good to have too many Caesars"), a pun on a line in Homer. Modern scholars disagree over whether this was the actual reason Augustus spared the city, as at the same time Augustus claimed he was also doing it to honor the memory of Alexander the Great, and some scholars also suggest that he did it to curry favor with that city's elite. Arius as well as his two sons, Dionysius and Nicanor, are said to have instructed Augustus in philosophy. He is frequently mentioned by Themistius, who says that Augustus valued him not less than Agrippa. He is presumably the "Arius" whose Life was among those in the missing final section of book VII of the Lives of Diogenes Laërtius.

Others sources state that he was offered the post of Praefectus or governor of Egypt, but that Areius turned Augustus down in order to take a post in the province of Sicilia, though modern scholars have some doubt about this anecdote (primarily because there are no other examples of anyone being "offered" a post by Augustus and having turned him down). It has been suggested that this story was state propaganda to justify Augustus's removal of Areius from the province of Egypt and installation of Cornelius Gallus as Praefectus.

Areius was succeeded as "personal philosopher" of Augustus by the philosopher Theon. From Quintilian it appears that Areius also taught or wrote on rhetoric.

== Philosophy ==
Arius Didymus is usually identified with the Arius whose works are quoted at length by Stobaeus, summarising Stoic, Peripatetic and Platonist philosophy. That his full name is Arius Didymus we know from Eusebius, who quotes two long passages of his concerning Stoic views on God, the conflagration of the Universe, and the soul. One of Heraclitus' "river fragments", On those who enter the same rivers, ever different waters flow - and souls are exhaled from the moist things, is referred to by the philosopher Cleanthes, successor of Zeno of Citium: Arius Didymus observes that Cleanthes held that Heraclitus and Zeno shared similar views about the soul: Eusebius quotes Arius Didymus, and so a link to Heraclitus's teaching can be traced.
