= Émard =

Émard is a French surname of Germanic origin. Notable people with the surname include:

- Joseph-Médard Émard (1853–1927), Canadian archbishop
- René Émard (1914–1984), Canadian politician
- Stéphane Émard-Chabot, Canadian politician
- William Émard (born 2000), Canadian artistic gymnast

== See also ==
- Emar
- Amar
- Ammar
- Emmar
