= Amarnath =

Amarnath may refer to:

== Places ==
- Amarnath Temple, Hindu shrine in Anantnag district, Jammu and Kashmir, India
- Amarnath Peak, mountain in Ganderbal district of Kashmir, in the vicinity of Sonamarg

== People ==
=== As a surname ===
- Lala Amarnath (1911–2000), Indian Test cricketer
- Mohinder Amarnath (born 1950), Indian cricketer
- Surinder Amarnath (born 1948), Indian cricketer
- Gopi Amarnath, Indian cinematographer, who works in the Tamil film industry
- Palani Amarnath (born 1982), Indian cricketer
- K. Amarnath (1914–1983), Indian film producer and director
- Satish Amarnath, Indian microbiologist

=== As a given name ===
- Amar Nath (1909–1996), Indian classical vocalist
- Amarnath Sehgal (1922–2007), Indian sculptor, painter and poet, Padma Bhushan (2008)
- Amarnath Gami (born 1967), Indian politician
- Amarnath Pradhan (born 1958), Indian politician and member of Parliament
- Amarnath Vidyalankar (1901–1985), Indian freedom fighter, journalist, social worker and member of Parliament
- Amarnath Jha (died 1947), Vice Chancellor of University of Allahabad and Banaras Hindu University

== Other ==
- Amarnath Express, Indian Railways train that runs between Guwahati and Jammu Tawi in India
- Amarnath (film), a 1978 Kannada film
- Amarnath land transfer controversy, 2008

== See also ==
- Amaranth (disambiguation)
- Amar (disambiguation)
