= Netaji Subhas Institute of Technology, Bihta =

Engineering college in Bihta, Patna, India

Netaji Subhas Institute of Technology
- Type: Private
- Established: 2008
- Affiliations: Bihar Engineering University (B.Tech); State Board of Technical Education (Diploma) Aryabhatta Knowledge University (BBA & BCA)
- Chairman: Mr. M. M. Singh
- Director: Sheojee Singh
- Member Secretary: M.M.Singh
- Location: Amhara, Bihta (Patna district), Bihar, 801106, India; 25.3216°N 84.517°E
- Campus: Rural
- Language: English, Hindi
- Website: nsit.in

Netaji Subhas Institute of Technology is a private engineering college located in Bihta, Patna, India, offering B.Tech & diploma courses. It is affiliated to Aryabhatta Knowledge University, Patna. Netaji Subhas Institute of Technology, Bihta has no educational or institutional links with the NSUT(Formerly NSIT), Delhi.

== History ==
NSIT was established in 2007 with the approval of AICTE, Department of Science & Technology, Government of Bihar, State Board of Technical Education and the Magadh University, Bodh Gaya. Following the creation of a technical university in 2008 in Bihar, NSIT's engineering courses are now under Aryabhatta Knowledge University, Patna.

== Campus ==
NSIT has a fully residential campus on 400,000 square feet (9.2 acres) of land. Campus facilities include faculty and staff residences, student hostels, cooperative mess and a sports complex. The campus has a main administrative block, digital library, laboratories, workshops, auditorium, conference rooms and a modern canteen, wifi.

== Programmes ==
The college offers the following undergraduate courses. The medium of instruction for all courses is Hindi or English.

=== B.Tech ===
B.Tech courses are affiliated to Bihar Engineering University. The Institute offers 4-year Bachelor of Technology degree programmes in following fields:

- Electrical & Electronics Engineering
- Computer Engineering
- Electronics & Communication Engineering
- Mechanical Engineering
- Civil Engineering

=== Diploma ===
Diploma courses are affiliated to State Board of Technical Education. The Institute offers diploma degree programs in following fields:

- Mechanical Engineering
- Electrical & Electronics Engineering
- Civil Engineering
- Electrical Engineering
- Computer Science and Engineering

== See also ==
- Indian Institute of Technology Patna
