= Shia Muslim Foundation =

- Abbreviation: SMF
- Founded: 2020
- Type: 501(c)(3), Public Charity
- Tax ID no.: 86-1914327
- Location: Silver Spring, MD
- Website: shiamuslimfoundation.com

The Shia Muslim Foundation is a registered non-profit organization founded in 2020. The foundation is dedicated to supporting the civic rights of American Shia Muslims and advocating on social and political issues.

== Overview ==
The SMF works globally to promote the rights and welfare of Shia Muslims. Through various initiatives and programs, it addresses challenges faced by the Shia Muslim community, fostering understanding and appreciation of the Shia faith. Its primary focus is the raising awareness of crises, conflicts and persecution of Shia Muslims in countries like Afghanistan, Pakistan, and Iraq, advocating for Shia Muslim rights and providing aid to those affected, including refugees and bereaved families. In the United States, the foundation promotes understanding and acceptance of the Shia faith, educating the public about Shia beliefs and practices. It also endeavors to build cooperation between Shia and Sunni communities. Through its initiatives, the Shia Muslim Foundation seeks to contribute to the betterment of Shia Muslims worldwide and advocates for a just and peaceful society for all.

== History ==
The SMF was founded some time in 2020.

In May 2021, Joe Biden, president of the United States, reinstated the White House's tradition of celebrating Ramadan and Eid al-Fitr. This event, held on May 1, was historically meaningful for Muslim Americans, symbolizing recognition and inclusion. The Shia Muslim Foundation was among the organizations that attended the celebration, reflecting the rich diversity of the Muslim American community.

On March 5, 2022, the SMF provided over $2,500 worth of food and groceries to about 30 Afghan refugee families in Landover, Maryland. The dire situation of the refugees was highlighted by the story of a young girl who approached the volunteers for food, indicating her family's desperate need. Throughout the day, similar stories emerged, showcasing the refugees' severe hardships, yet they remained hopeful and supportive of one another. The SMF planned to continue their support with another donation drive before Ramadan in April 2022, calling for community contributions to aid these efforts.

In August 2022, following the killings of Muslim men in Albuquerque by a serial killer, the SMF participated in a joint press conference with the Council on American–Islamic Relations (CAIR) and other Sunni and Shia organizations. The conference was a response to the arrest of a Sunni man accused of committing the murders out of anti-Shia sentiment. Rahat Husain of SMF highlighted the unity between Shia and Sunni Muslims in the US, emphasizing the importance of love and friendship amidst the crisis. He called for addressing any form of anti-Shia hatred while maintaining the solidarity that exists within the Muslim community in America. The incident spurred efforts from both Sunni and Shia communities in the US to foster better understanding and prevent such divisions and hatred from taking root. The SMF's involvement in the press conference underscores its commitment to combating Islamophobia and sectarian hatred, and to promoting unity among Muslims in the US.

In September 2022, concerns about the immigration challenges facing visiting Imams were raised by the Shia Muslim Foundation. The SMF highlighted the increasing difficulties these religious leaders encountered when entering the U.S., which impacted the Shia community's ability to practice their religion freely. The Foundation has called for immediate action to address these issues and requested a meeting with officials to discuss resolutions.

On April 20, 2023, the SMF announced the donation of numerous laptops to Shia Muslim community members in Washington, D.C., focusing on those impacted by the COVID-19 pandemic. This initiative aimed to address the digital divide and support education, employment, and connectivity for individuals lacking these critical resources. The recipients, particularly those experiencing financial difficulties, job loss, or educational barriers, welcomed the laptops with gratitude, acknowledging the potential positive changes in their lives. A spokesperson for the SMF reaffirmed the organization's dedication to assisting community members, especially in challenging times, with hopes that the technology will aid in long-term success and communication.

In May 2023, the Shia Muslim Foundation was represented at a White House listening session on Islamophobia. The session, hosted by Second Gentleman Doug Emhoff and other senior administration officials, was part of the Biden-Harris administration's efforts to counter Islamophobia and related forms of bias and discrimination within the United States. The foundation's president participated among other Muslim community leaders to discuss challenges and share recommendations for confronting hate and bigotry.

On a Wednesday in April 2023, the White House conducted a listening session on Islamophobia. High-level officials from the Biden administration, including Second Gentleman Douglas Emhoff and other senior figures, met with American Muslim community leaders to address the issue of Islamophobia. The SMF was among the participating organizations. The session aimed to gather insights on the challenges faced by Muslim communities and explore recommendations to combat Islamophobia and bigotry. The Biden-Harris administration expressed appreciation for the leadership shown by the participants and reaffirmed the President's commitment to countering Islamophobia. An incident involving the Muslim mayor of Prospect Park, New Jersey, Mohamed Khairullah, who was prevented from attending the White House celebration, highlighted ongoing concerns about Islamophobia within federal agencies.

The SMF has actively addressed concerns regarding the persecution of Shias in Pakistan, particularly in light of recent amendments to the blasphemy laws. In October 2023, the SMF's Executive Director penned a letter to Pakistan's ambassador to the United States, expressing the distress of the Pakistani Shia community in the US over the "Tauheen E Sahaba" bill. The letter articulated the Shia community's respect for the Sahaba while expressing apprehension about the bill's potential for misuse. It drew parallels between the proposed law and the existing blasphemy laws, which have been used to target minority religious places and individuals. In April 2025, Montgomery County, Maryland awarded $1.2 million in security grants to county-based nonprofits, faith-based organizations, and houses of worship at risk of hate-bias incidents through its Nonprofit Security Grant Program. The grant cycle, announced by County Executive Marc Elrich, represented a 38% increase in applications over the prior year. Idara-e-Jaferia, the prominent Shia Islamic center in Burtonsville, Maryland, was among the eligible faith-based institutions. The SMF's Executive Director was present at the award ceremony and praised the county's commitment to community safety.

In August 2025, the SMF responded to threats made against participants in the Arba'een Procession in Dearborn, Michigan. Anthony Young, 27, of Garden City, Michigan, was charged with malicious use of telecommunication services after allegedly threatening to harm attendees at the annual march commemorating Ashura, organized by the Karbalaa Islamic Educational Center. Dearborn police arrested the suspect within hours after detecting the threats through online monitoring operations. He was arraigned in 19th District Court and ordered to wear a GPS tether. The SMF called the incident an attack on religious freedom and urged law enforcement to apply the full weight of the law to threats against religious minorities, while also praising the swift response of Dearborn police.

In November 2025, the SMF joined other American Muslim organizations in congratulating Zohran Mamdani on his election as New York City's first Muslim and South Asian mayor. The Foundation described the victory as a milestone for Muslim civic engagement and expressed interest in collaborating with the new administration on issues including housing equity and interfaith cooperation.

Congresswoman Sarah Elfreth (MD-03) recognized the SMF's advocacy work through a post on her official Facebook page, noting that the organization has been a fierce advocate for the rights of Shia Muslims since its founding in 2020.

In April 2026, the SMF, together with the Universal Muslim Association of America (UMAA) and Idara-e-Jaferia, convened a meeting with Senator Chris Van Hollen (D-MD) and his national security team at the United States Senate. The coalition's joint appearance marked the first time organizations of this standing had united to present a coordinated federal security agenda on behalf of American Shia Muslims at the Senate level, representing the highest-level federal engagement on Shia community safety in the history of American Shia advocacy. The meeting followed a series of engagements earlier that same month, including meetings with the Montgomery County Police Department, the Governor of Maryland's Office of Homeland Security, and Congresswoman Sarah Elfreth (MD-03). Congresswoman Elfreth committed to sending formal correspondence to the FBI and the Department of Homeland Security requesting proactive monitoring of threats to Muslim houses of worship in Maryland.

On October 17, 2026, Maryland Lieutenant Governor Aruna Miller presented SMF with a Governor's Citation for its services to Maryland residents during the Faith & Mental Health Community Workshop in Burtonsville, Maryland. At the same event, State Senator Clarence Lam presented SMF and Idara e Jaferia with a Maryland General Assembly proclamation recognizing their 2026 workshop and its support for the well-being of residents of Montgomery County and Maryland.
