= Sagres Point =

Promontory of southern Portugal

Coordinates: 37°00′23″N 8°56′21″W

Sagres Point's location in Continental Portugal

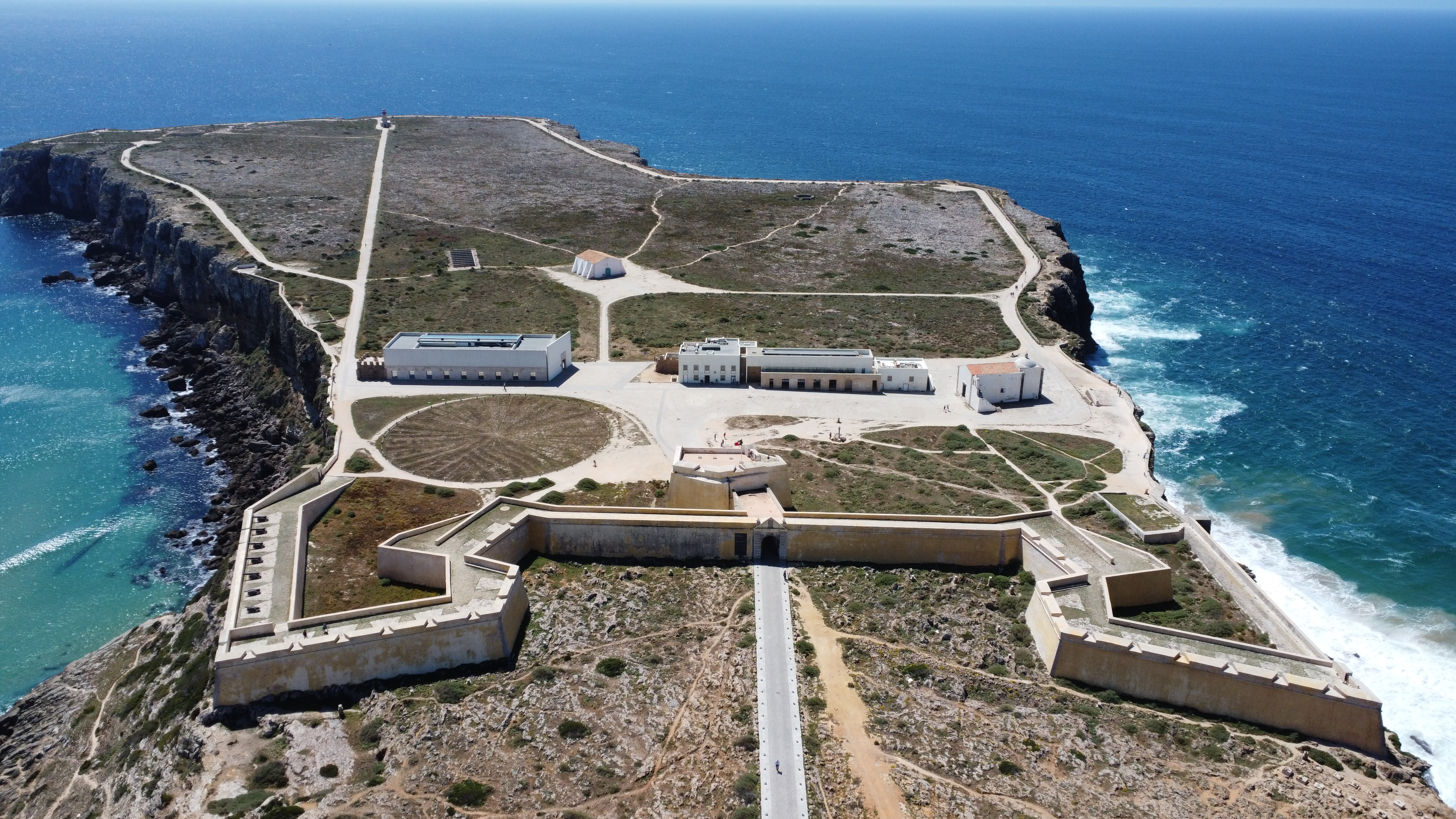
The windswept point with the castle.

Sagres Point (Ponta de Sagres, Portuguese pronunciation: [ˈsaɣɾɨʃ], from the Latin Promontorium Sacrum ‘Holy Promontory’) is a windswept shelf-like promontory located in the southwest Algarve region of southern Portugal. Only 4 km to the west and 3 km to the north lies Cape St. Vincent (Cabo de São Vicente), which is usually taken as the southwesternmost tip of Europe. The vicinity of Sagres Point and Cape St. Vincent has been used for religious purposes since Neolithic times, to which standing menhirs near Vila do Bispo, a few miles from both points, attest.

== History ==
The promontory of Sagres has always been important for sailors because it offers a shelter for ships before attempting the dangerous voyage around Cape St. Vincent (could be Belixe Bay, between Sagres Point and the Cape, or Sagres Bay, to the east). Given the dangers of being blown onto the coastal rocks, captains preferred to wait in the lee of the point until favourable winds allowed them to continue.

=== Strabo ===
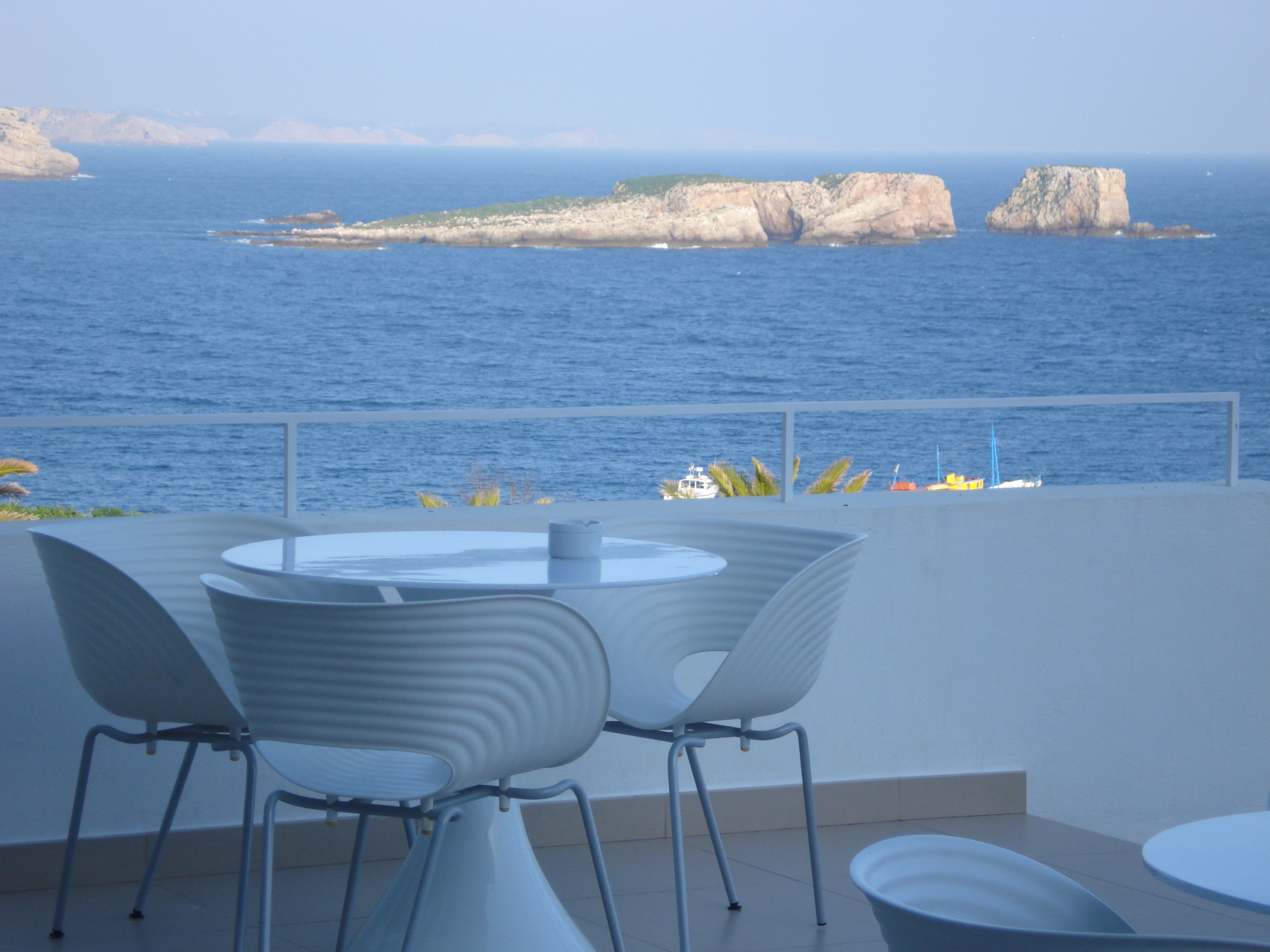
Martinhal Islets, at the Sagres Harbor entrance.

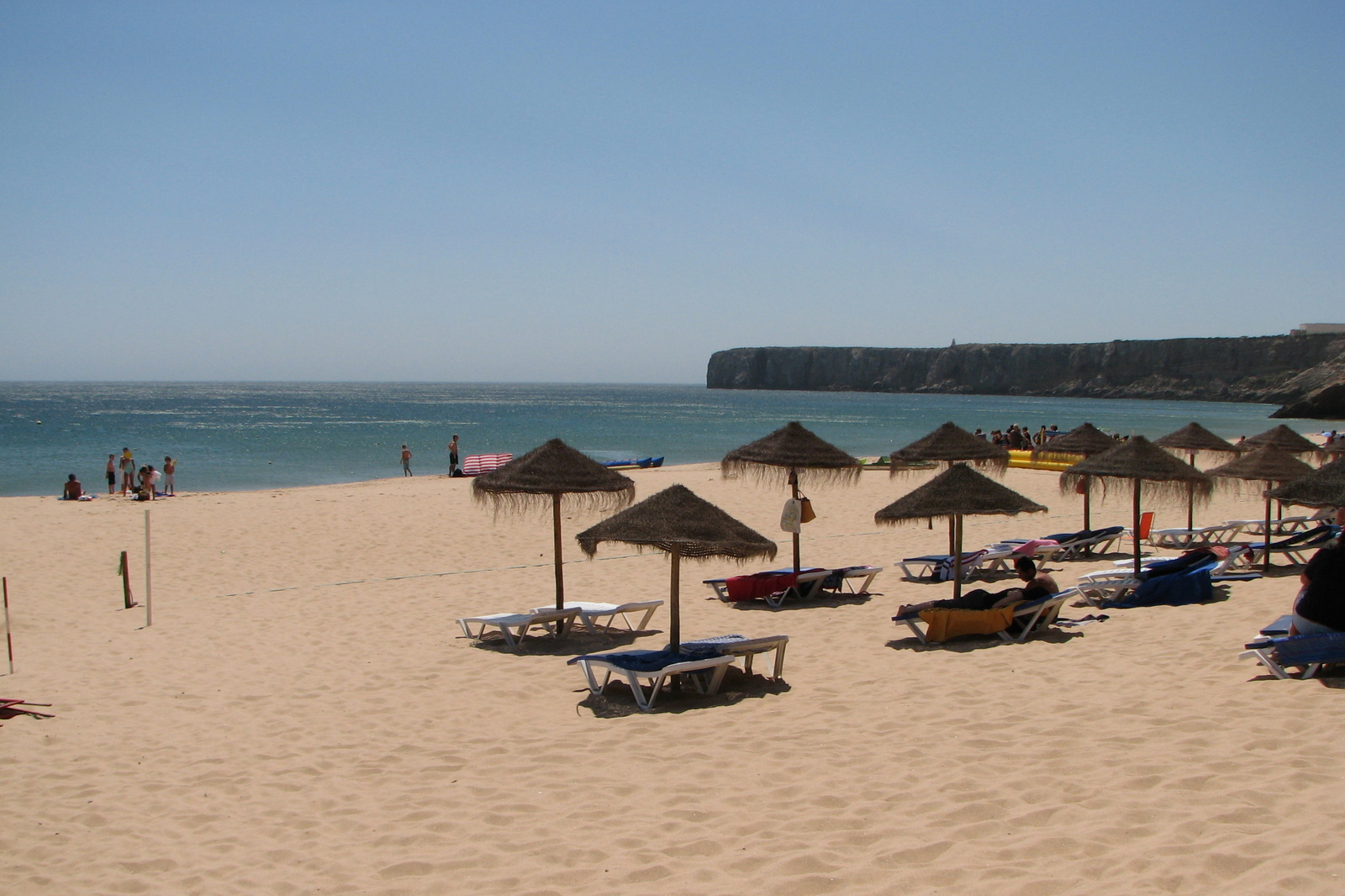
Tonel Beach in Sagres

There is some question whether Sagres Point, whose name derives from Sacrum Promontorium, or neighboring Cape St. Vincent, was the ancient sacred promontory. Strabo believed the promontory was the most westerly point of the "whole inhabited world." In fact Cape St. Vincent is more westerly, but because it is further north, and Strabo's map of the Iberian Peninsula is rotated clockwise, bringing the Pyrenees into a north–south line, it could have been taken as further east. The most westerly point of the Iberian Peninsula and of the European continent is Cabo da Roca, near Sintra; the southernmost, Punta de Tarifa, in Andalusia. The rocks at the base of the Cape St. Vincent lighthouse are called "fim do mundo", or "end of the world".

Strabo reports (Book 3.1.4) as follows:

The region adjacent to this cape they call in the Latin tongue Cuneum, which signifies a wedge. The promontory which projects into the sea, Artemidorus (who states that he has himself been at the place) compares to a ship; three little islands, each having a small harbour, contribute to give it this form; the former island resembling the beak of the ship, and the two latter the beams on each side of the ship's bows ... there is no temple of Hercules shown there, as Ephorus falsely states, nor yet any altar nor to any other divinity; but in many parts there are three or four stones placed together, which are turned by all travellers who arrive there, in accordance with a certain local custom, and are changed in position by such as turn them incorrectly. It is not lawful to offer sacrifice there, nor yet to approach the place during the night, for it is said that then the gods take up their abode at the place. Those who go thither to view it stay at a neighbouring village overnight, and proceed to the place on the morrow, carrying water with them, as there is none to be procured there.

No part of Cape St. Vincent fits this description, but on the eastern side of Sagres Point is a harbor, Baleeira, port of the modern town of Sagres, protected by four small islands in a line (the tiny Martinhal Islets) visible in satellite imagery. At the far eastern end of the beach of Martinhal, erosion of the cliffs has exposed a series of Roman pottery kilns for fabricating transport amphoras and roof tiles.

=== Henry the Navigator ===
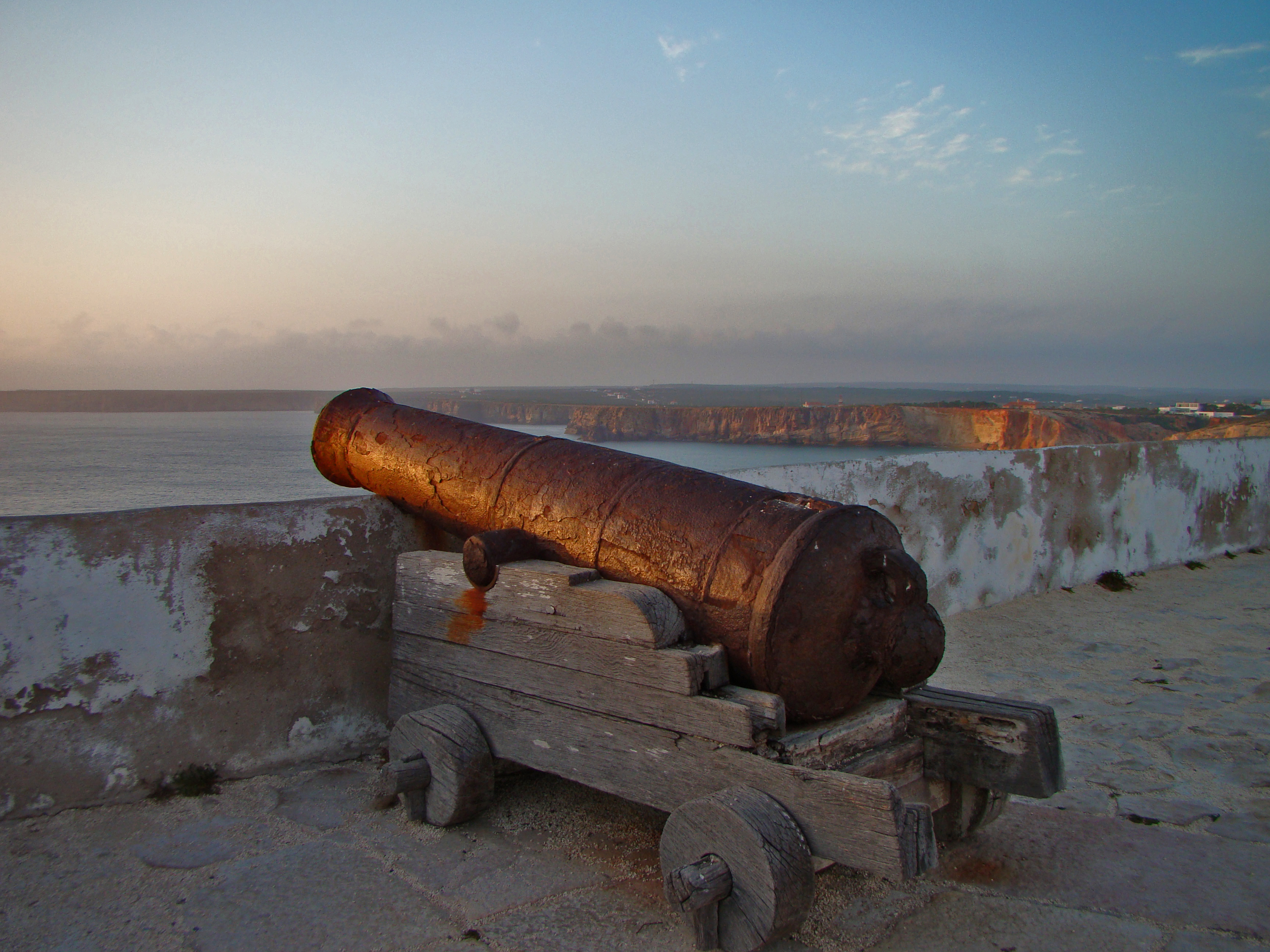
Cannon inside the fortress

When Henry the Navigator commenced his explorations, which would initiate the Portuguese Age of Discoveries, at his Vila do Infante, Sagres peninsula lacked the necessary requirements for such large undertakings. Fresh water was scarce, agriculture was minimal, there was a shortage of wood for shipbuilding, no deep-water landing site, and the population was small. Henry re-populated a village called Terçanabal, which had been deserted due to continuous pirate attacks on the coast. The village was situated in a strategic position for his maritime enterprises and was later called Vila do Infante.

Henry the Navigator employed cartographers, such as Jehuda Cresques, to help him chart the coast of Mauretania in the wake of voyages he had caused to be made to there. He also engaged an expert map and instrument-maker, Jayme of Majorca, so that his captains might have the best nautical information. This probably led to the legend of the Nautical School of Sagres (although a "school" also means a group of followers). There was no centre of navigational science or any supposed observatory, if compared to the modern definition of "observatory" or "navigational centre". The centre of his expeditions was actually at Lagos, further to the east along the Algarve coast. Later Portuguese voyages left from Belém, just west of Lisbon.

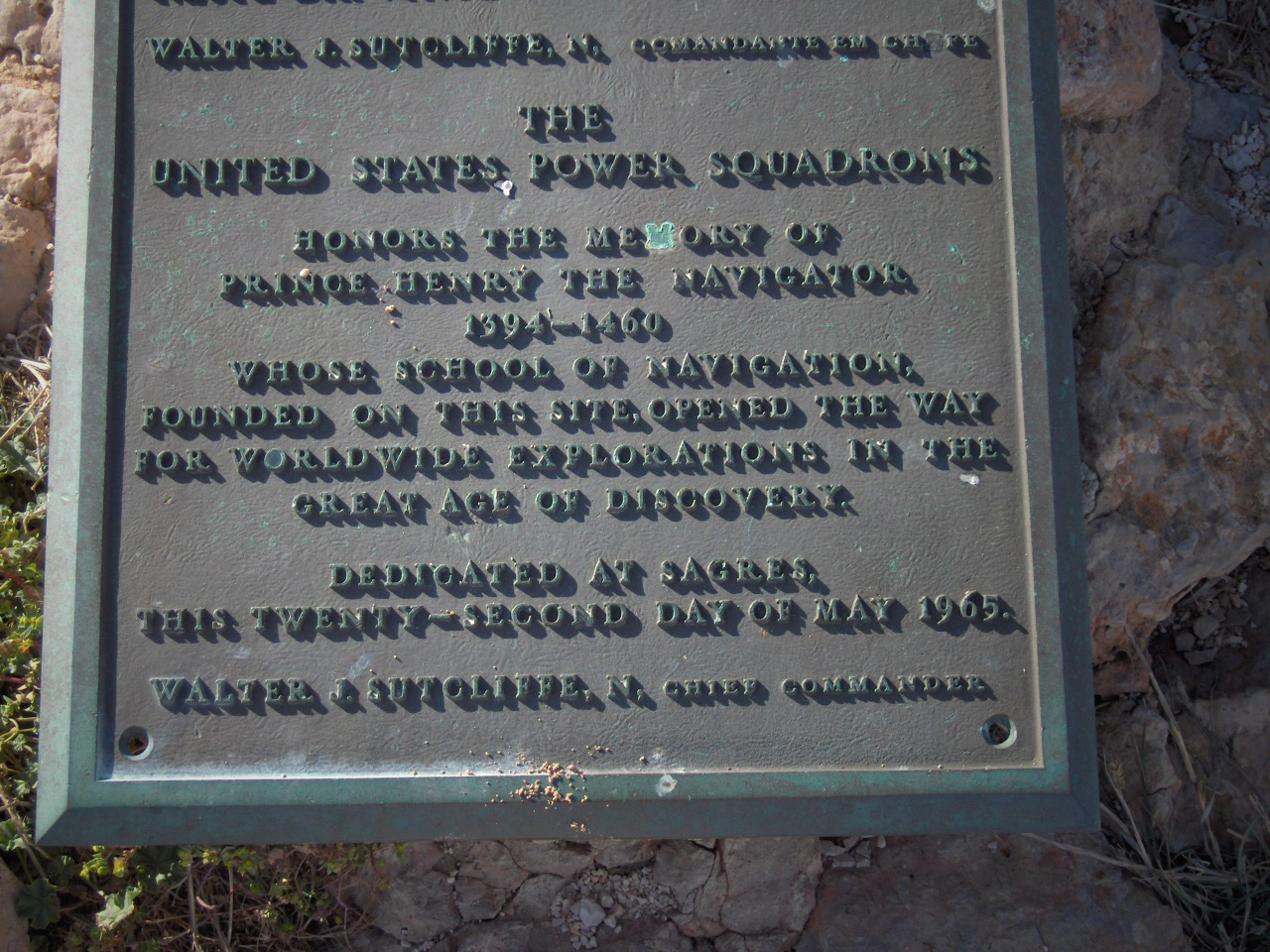
Plaque honoring Henry the Navigator, erected by the United States Power Squadrons.

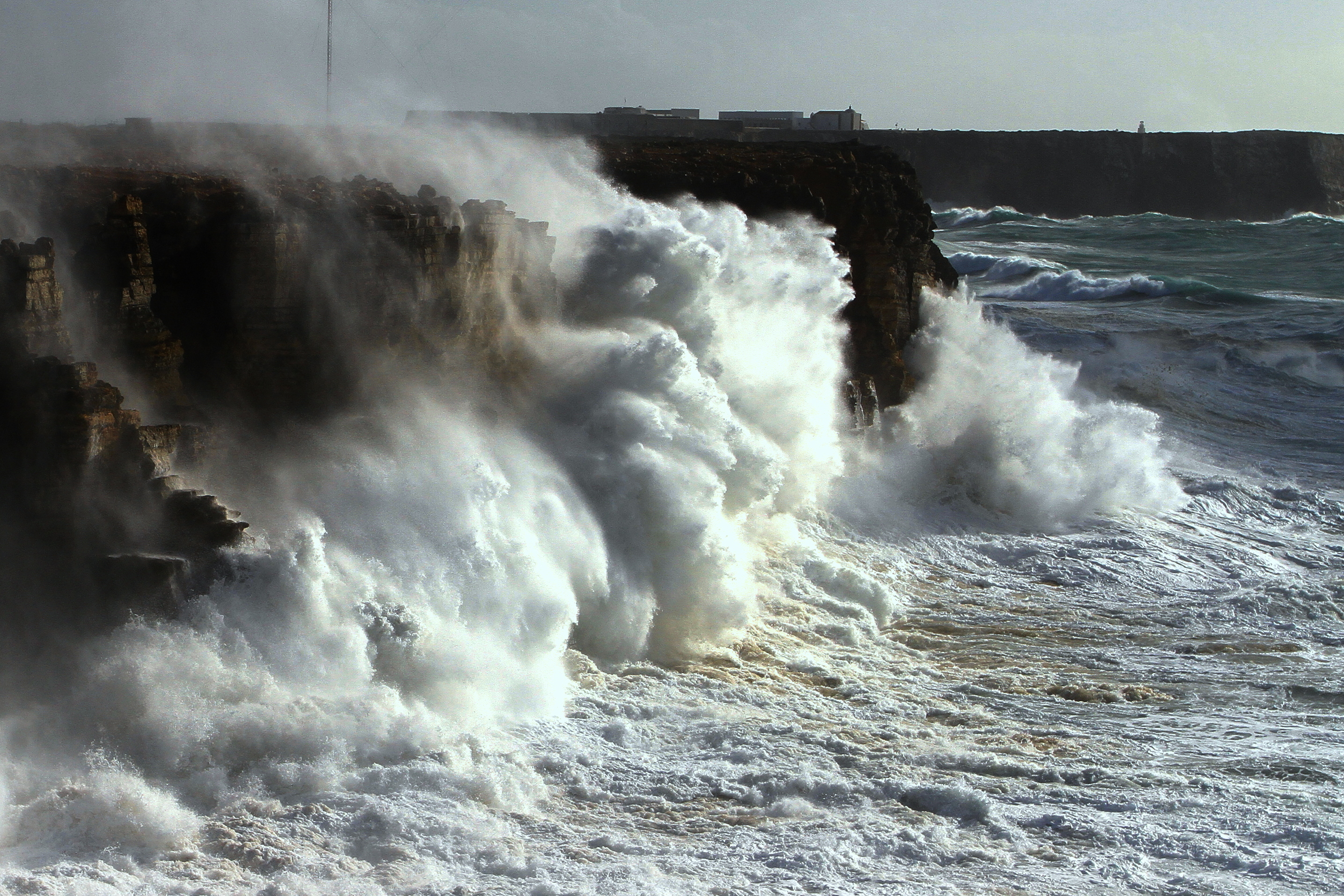
Sagres, Portugal

This was a time of many important discoveries: cartography was being refined with the use of newly devised instruments, such as an improved astrolabe and improved sundial, maps were regularly being updated and extended, and a revolutionary type of vessel known as the caravel was designed.

Prince Henry built a chapel next to his house in 1459, as he began to spend more time in the Sagres area in his later years. He died at Sagres on 13 November 1460.

The exact location of Henry's School of Navigation is not known (it is popularly believed to have been destroyed by the 1755 Lisbon earthquake).

== Fortress history ==
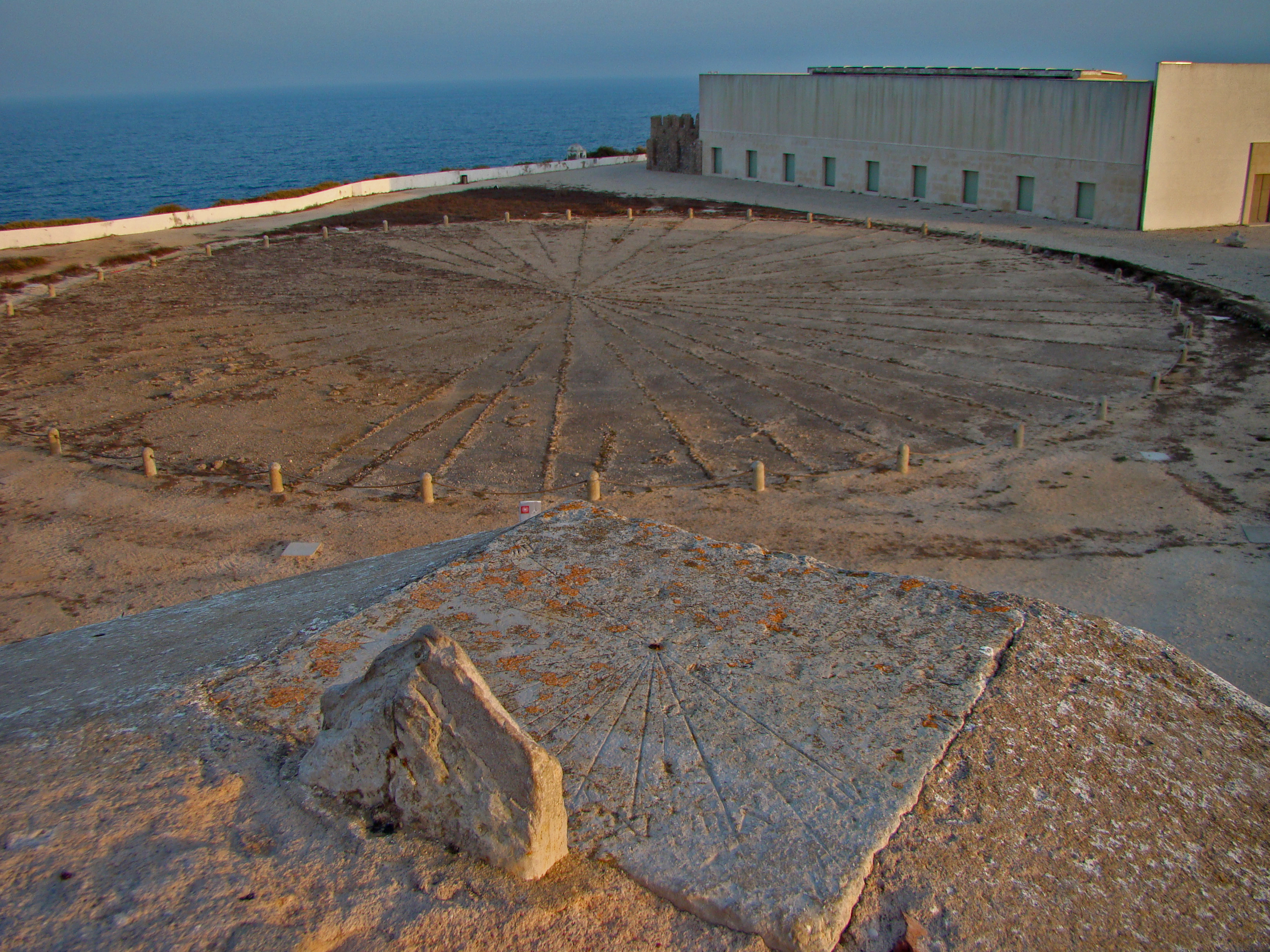
The compass rose.

The 16th century bulwark-like fortress was severely damaged during the Great Earthquake of 1755. It was restored in the mid 20th century, but there is still a 16th-century turret present. After passing through the thick tunnel entrance, one sees a giant pebble compass rose (rosa dos ventos) of 43 m diameter. Normally compass roses are divided into 32 segments, but strangely this one has 40 segments (probably an error of the 20th-century restorers). It is unlikely to date back to the time of Henry the Navigator.

The much-restored church Nossa Senhora da Graça dates from 1579. It replaced the original church of Henry the Navigator of 1459. It was also damaged by the earthquake of 1755. Some alterations to the church were made, such as the building of a new bell tower over the old charnel house of the cemetery. There are still a set of tombstones present. Inside this unpretentious church, the 17th century Baroque retable above the altar originates from the Capela de Santa Catarina do Forte de Belixe (St. Catherine's Chapel in Belixe Fortress), while the polychrome statues of St. Vincent and St. Francis were once part of the Franciscan convent on the Cape St. Vincent.

Next to the church stands a replica stone standard (padrão), used by the explorers to claim a newly discovered territory.

== Gallery ==
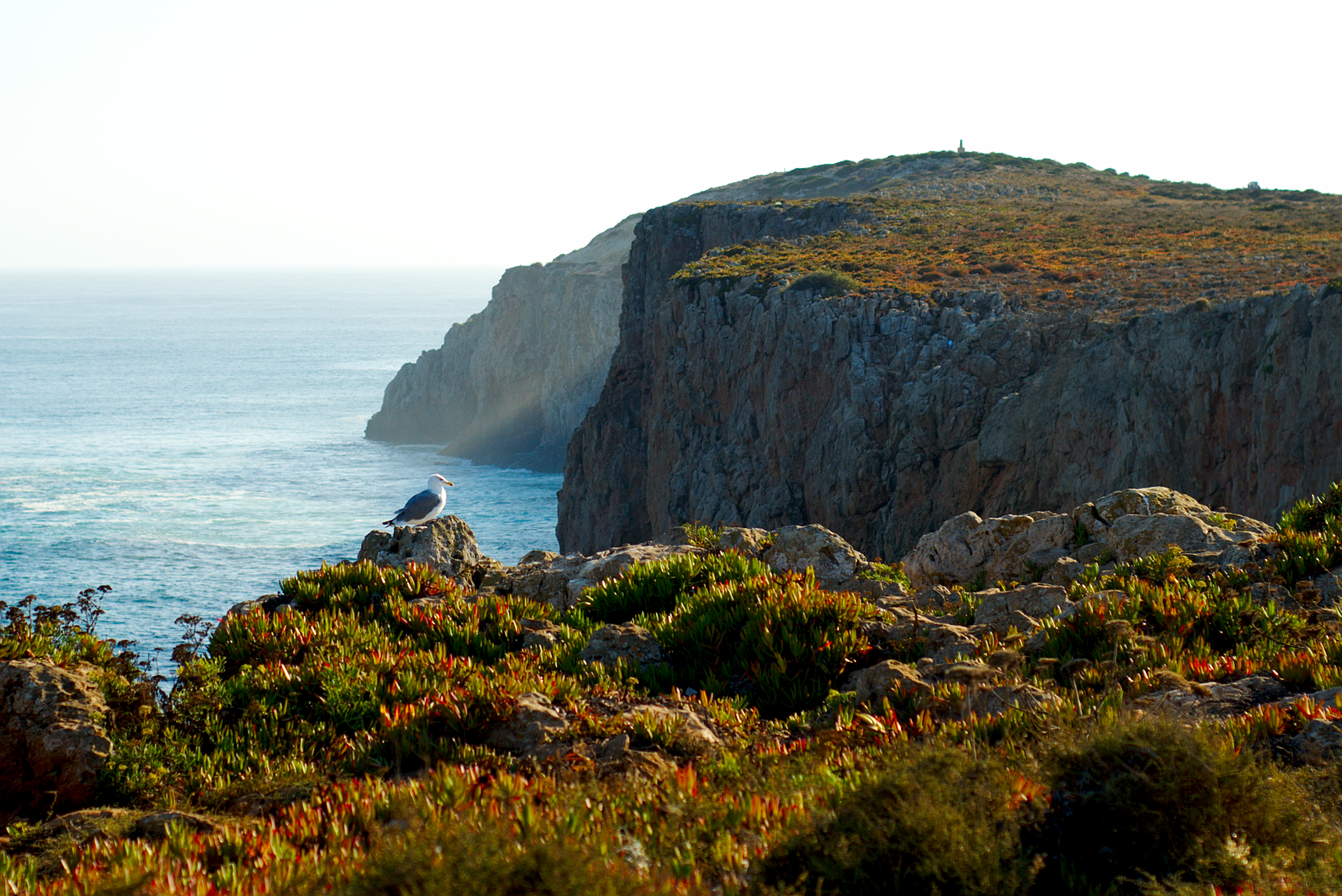
Sagres, Portugal

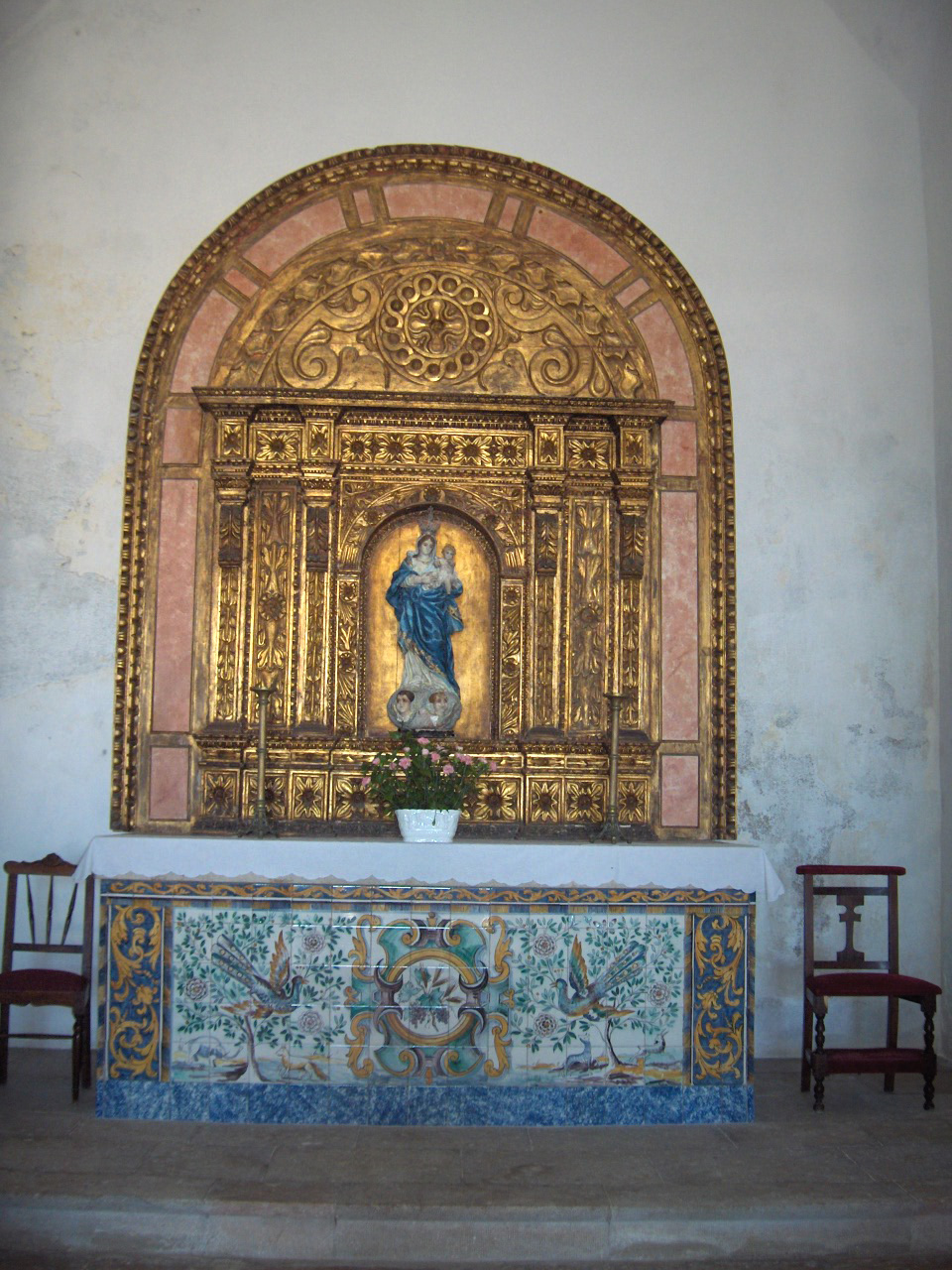
Retable in the church

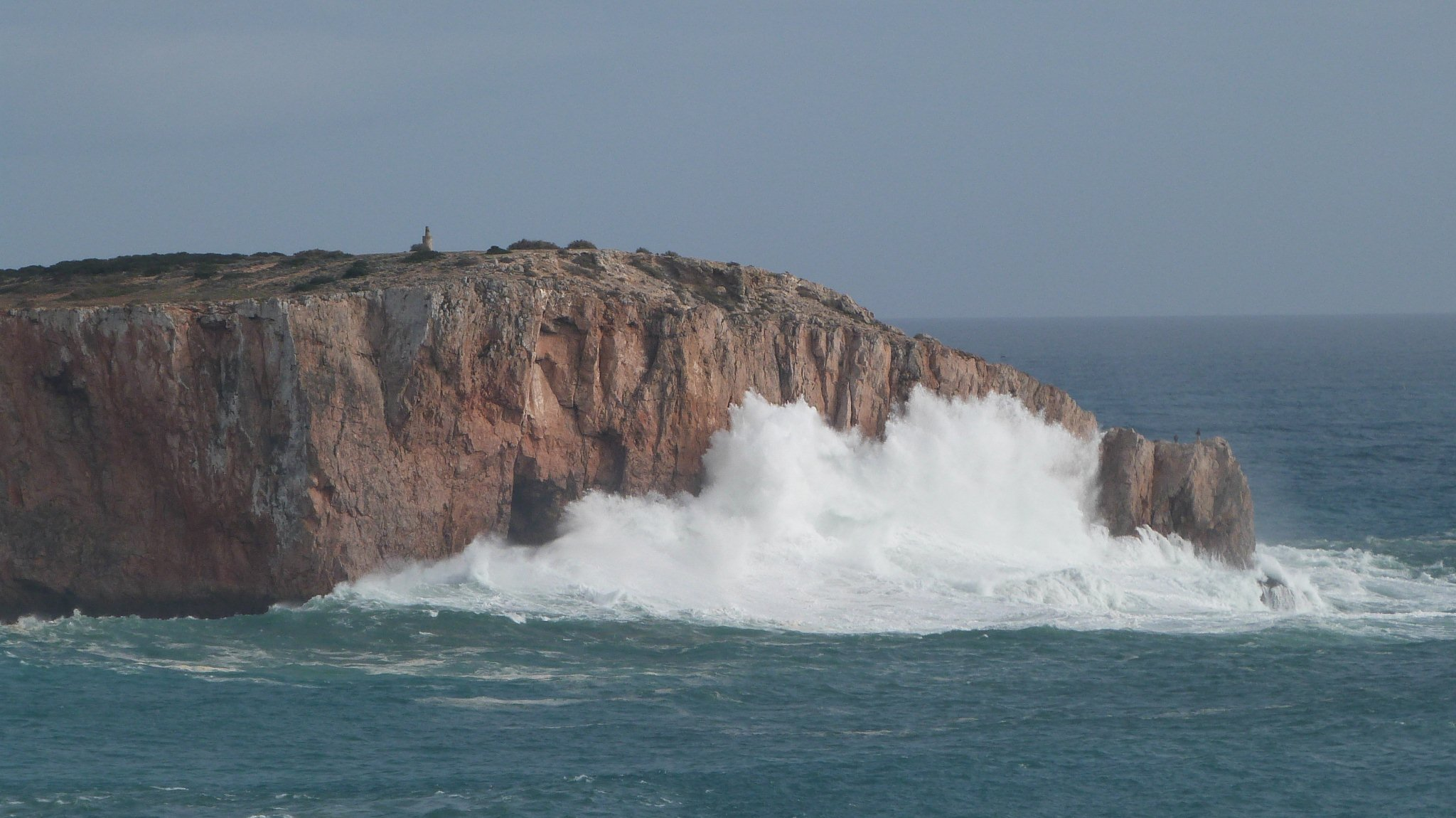
Sagres, Portugal

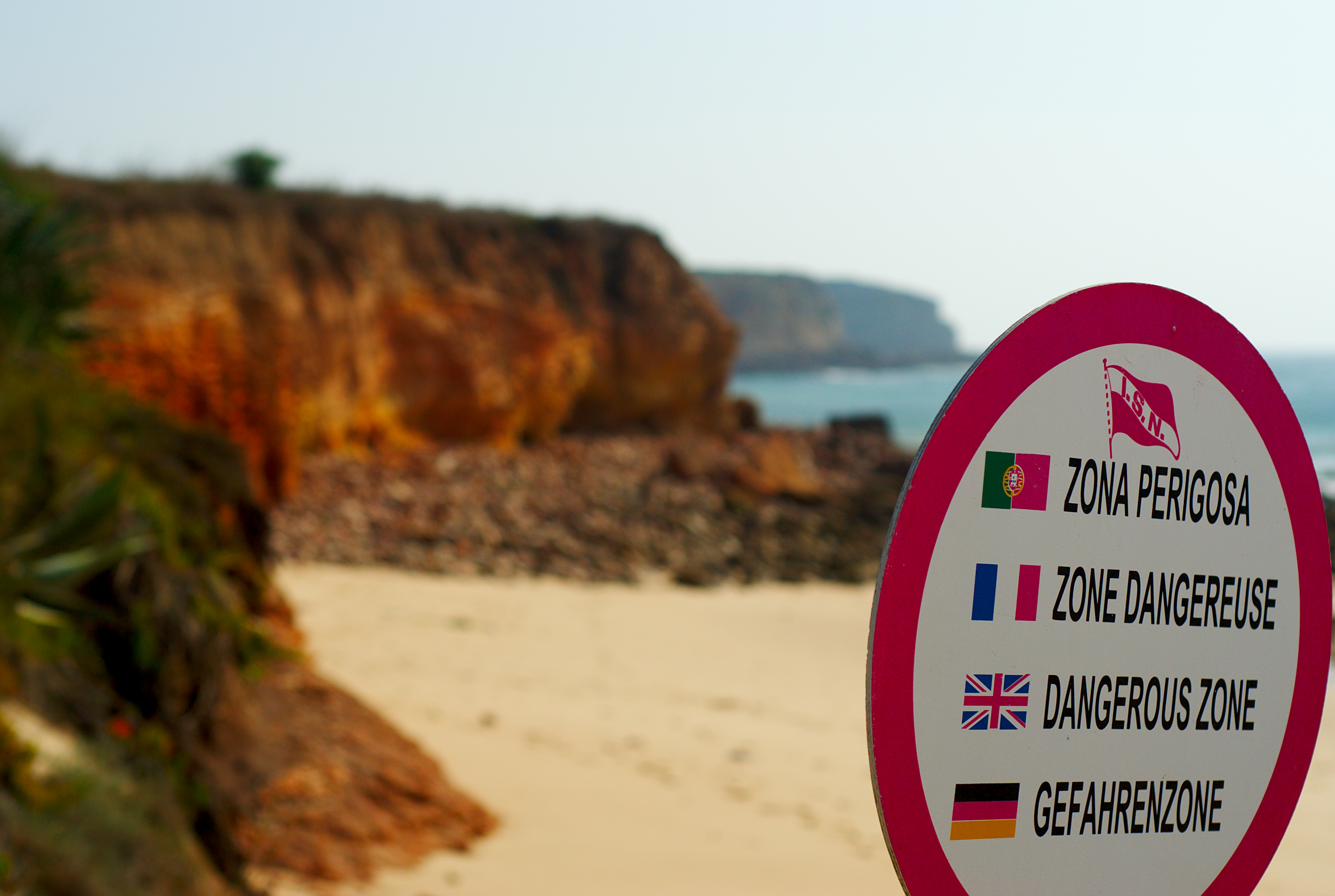
Sagres, Portugal

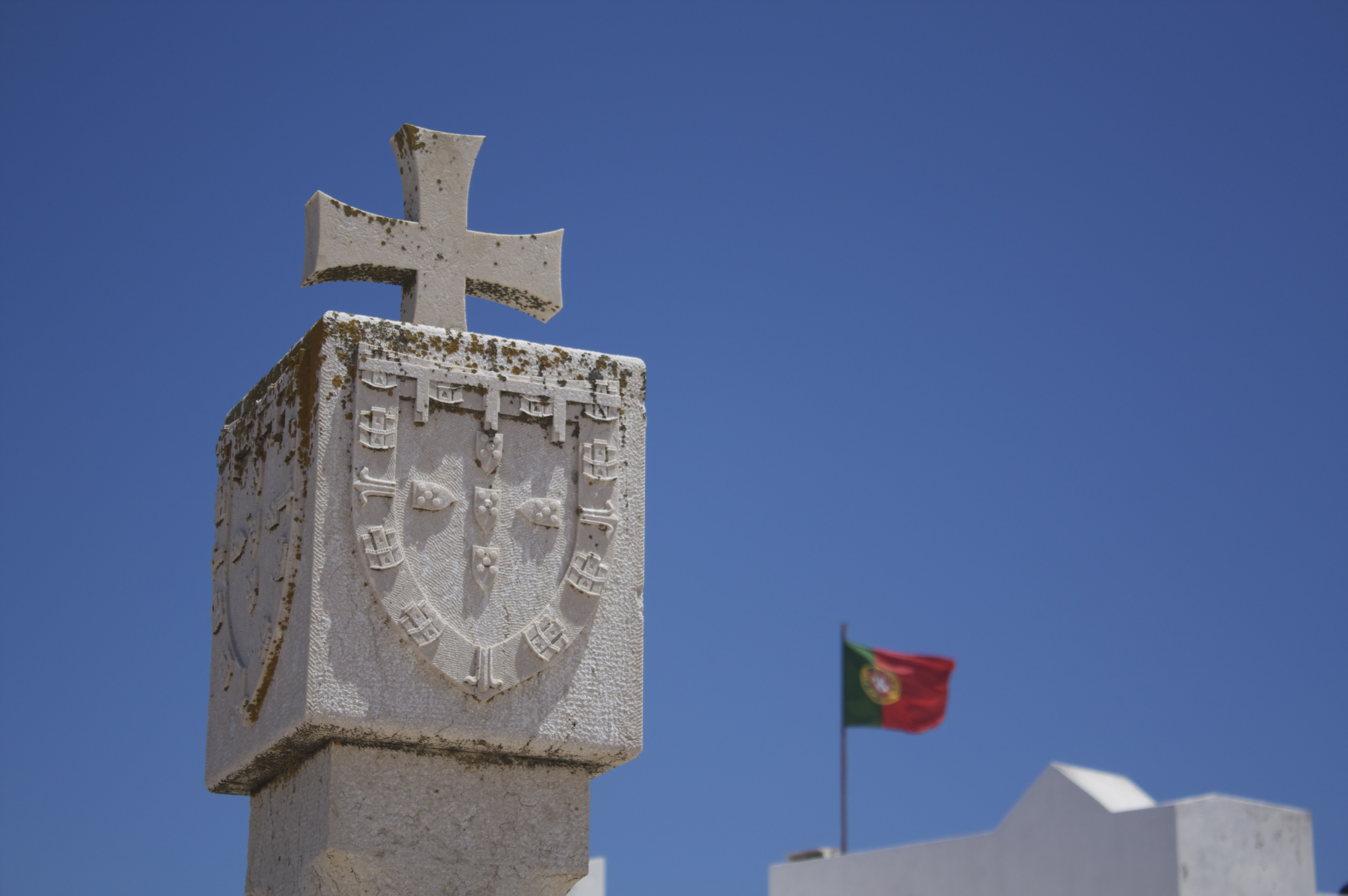
Sagres, Portugal

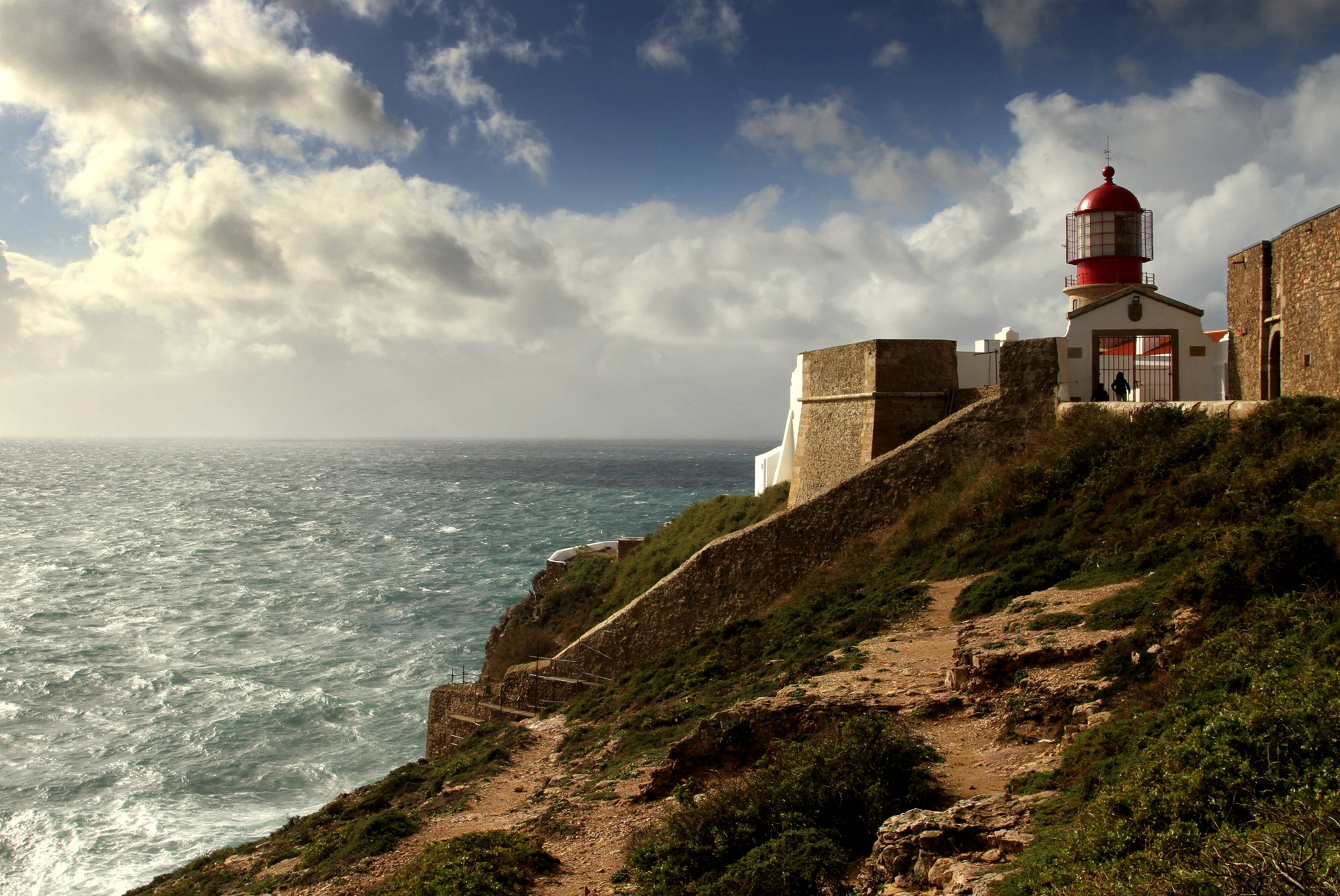
Sagres, Portugal

== See also ==
- Pytheas
- Land's End
- Sacred promontory
- Chukotka Autonomous Okrug
