= Amara =

Amara may refer to:

== Places ==
- Amara, Iran, a village in Markazi Province, Iran
- Amara, Nubia, towns in Sudan
- Amara, Romania, a town in Ialomiţa County, south-eastern Romania
- Amara, a village in Balta Albă Commune, Buzău County, Romania
- Amara (Udhampur district), village in Jammu and Kashmir, India
- Amarah or "Al-Amarah", a city in Iraq
- Amara, a neighbourhood in San Sebastián, Spain
- Mount Amara, Ethiopia
- Ömerli, Şanlıurfa, village in Turkey formerly named Amara

== People ==
- Abdelmalek Amara (born 2000), Algerian footballer
- Amara (singer), Indonesian singer
- Amara Asavananda (born 1937), Thai actress
- Amara Darboh (born 1994), American football player
- Amara Karan (born 1984), Sri-Lankan-British actress
- Amara La Negra, a Love & Hip Hop cast member
- Amara Sinha (c. 375 CE), Sanskrit grammarian
- Fadela Amara, French politician
- Roy Amara (1925–2007), American business writer and futurist
- Amara Walker (born 1981), American journalist

== Fiction ==
- Amara (Codex Alera), a Cursor and main character in the Codex Alera series by Jim Butcher
- Amara (film), a 2014 Indian Tamil-language film
- Magma (character), a Marvel Comics character, real name Amara Juliana Olivians Aquilla
- Amara Namani, played by Cailee Spaeny in the science fiction film Pacific Rim Uprising
- Amara Tenoh, the civilian name of Sailor Uranus in the English Cloverway dub of Sailor Moon
- A doll in the Groovy Girls line by Manhattan Toy
- A character also known as The Darkness in the American television series Supernatural
- A character in the American television series Once Upon a Time in Wonderland
- A character in the American television series The Vampire Diaries
- A Siren character in the video game Borderlands 3
- A recurring character in the American-Canadian animated television series SuperKitties

== Other ==
- Amara (beetle), a genus of carabid beetles
- Amara (subtitling), an online platform by the Participatory Culture Foundation for captioning and subtitling video
- Amara language, an Austronesian language from West New Britain Province, Papua New Guinea
- Amhara people, an ethnic group of Ethiopia (Amara in the Amharic language)
- Chiranjivi, immortal (amara in Sanskrit) beings in Hinduism
- A common name for Brassica carinata, Ethiopian mustard
- Amara, an imprint of Entangled Publishing

== See also ==
- Amar (disambiguation)
- Amhara (disambiguation)
- Amaran (disambiguation)
