= Amaranthine =

Amaranthine, amaranth, or amarantine may refer to:

== Common uses ==
- Amaranthine (pigment), a betacyanin plant antioxidant and pigment
- Amaranth (color), a shade of reddish-rose
- Amaranth, a genus of plant

== Music ==
- Amarantine (album), 2005 album by Enya
  - "Amarantine" (song), single and title track of the above album
- "Amaranthine", a 1994 song by Faye Wong from the album Sky
- "Amaranthine", a 2011 song by the band Amaranthe from the self-titled album Amaranthe
- "Amaranthine", a 2014 song by the band Crowbar from the album "Symmetry in Black"
- "Amaranthine", a 2015 song by the band Rhombus from the album Purity and Perversion
- "Amaranthine", a 2022 song by the band Cave In from the album Heavy Pendulum

== Games ==
- Amaranthine, a fictional city featured as the main setting of Dragon Age: Origins – Awakening

== See also ==
- Amaranth (disambiguation)
