= Amarantus of Alexandria =

Ancient Greek writer

Amarantus of Alexandria (Ancient Greek: Ἀμάραντος) was an ancient Greek writer who wrote a commentary on one of the idylls attributed to Theocritus, possibly from the writings of Theon, and a work titled On the Stage (Περὶ σκηνῆς), which is now lost. It probably contained biographical accounts of actors, and historical notes on stage performances. Regarding the time in which he lived, we know for certain that he lived after Juba II, king of Mauretania (1st century BC) and was probably an elderly contemporary of Galen in the 1st century AD.
