= Amaran =

Amaran (lit. 'undying, immortal') may refer to:

- Chiranjivi, immortal beings in Hinduism
- Amaran (band), a Swedish death metal band
- Amaran (1992 film), a 1992 Indian Tamil-language film by K. Rajeshwar
- Amaran (2024 film), a 2024 Indian Tamil-language film by Rajkumar Periasamy
  - Amaran (soundtrack), its soundtrack by G. V. Prakash Kumar
- Gangai Amaran, an Indian filmmaker and musician

== See also ==
- Amar (disambiguation)
- Amara (disambiguation)
