= Amar (Lebanese singer) =

Lebanese pop singer

- قمر محمود الطحش
- Born: Amar Mahmoud Al Tahech; 27 May 1986 (age 40); Tripoli, Lebanon
- Occupations: Singer and actress
- Years active: 2007–present
- Children: Jimmy, Luna

Amar Al Tahech (Arabic: قمر الطحش; born 27 May 1986) is a Lebanese singer and actress. After launching her debut single "Naroh Btehreny", she continued her career in the music industry and released her debut studio album titled Helwa.

== Early life ==
Amar was born in Tripoli, Lebanon. Her father was killed when she was about one year old. During her childhood, she spent approximately 15 years in an orphanage while her mother remarried and gave birth to a half-sister.

== Career ==
Amar launched her entertainment career as a singer in the mid-2000s, first gaining public attention with her debut single "Naroh Btehreny". She went on to release several popular songs and her first studio album, Helwa, which helped establish her presence in the Arabic pop music scene.

== Personal life ==
Amar's first marriage was to singer Adam when she was 20 years old; the marriage later ended in divorce. She subsequently entered a Nikah 'urfi marriage with Egyptian businessman Jamal Marwan, with whom she had a son, Jimmy. Marwan later denied paternity and refused to undergo a DNA test. Amar later married director of photography Mahdi Ghandour, with whom she had a daughter, Luna.

== Discography ==
=== Albums ===
- Helwa (2010)

=== Singles ===
List of singles as lead artist, with selected chart positions, showing year released and album name
Title	Year	Peak chart positions	Album
Title	Year	LBN	Album
"Naroh Btehreny"	2007	—	Arabica 2
"Al Ya'ny"	2008	—	Non-album single
"Oh La La"	2011	—	Helwa
"El Ataba Gazaz"	2011	—	Helwa
"Rannet Kholkhaly" (with Mohamed Ramadan, Saad El Soghayar & Karim Mahomud Abdel Aziz)	2012	—	Non-album singles
"Amar 14" (with Saad El Soghayar)	2012	—	Non-album singles
"Ma3 Nafsi"	2015	15	Non-album singles
"Yalla Nghani"	2016	—	Non-album singles
"Kiss My Lips"	2017	—	Non-album singles
"Ayza A3ish"	2018	—	Non-album singles
"Ana 7ala"	2018	8	Non-album singles
"BoM BoM" (feat. Eddy Wata)	2019	—	Non-album singles
"—" denotes a recording that did not chart or was not released in that territory.

== Filmography ==
=== Film ===
Year	Title	Arabic Title	Role	Notes
2012	Hasal Kh'eer	حصل خير	Amar	TV movie
2019	Hamlet Pharoan	حملة فرعون	Rama	TV movie

=== TV Series ===
Year	Title	Arabic Title	Role	Notes
2016	Nasibi Wa Qesmetik	نصيبي وقسمتي		
