= Amar (1), Kerman =

Coordinates: 28°46′N 58°58′E

Amar عمار (1)
- Village
- Interactive map of Amar
- Country: Iran
- Province: Kerman
- County: Fahraj
- Bakhsh: Negin Kavir
- Rural District: Chahdegal

Population (2006)
  - Total: 40
- Time zone: UTC+3:30 (IRST)
  - Summer (DST): UTC+4:30 (IRDT)

Amar (Persian: عمار (1), also Romanized as ʿAmār (1)) is a village in Chahdegal Rural District, Negin Kavir District, Fahraj County, Kerman Province, Iran. At the 2006 census, its population was 40, in 9 families.
