= USLHT Amaranth =

History

United States
- Name: USLHT Amaranth
- Namesake: Amaranth
- Ordered: 30 August 1890
- Awarded: 10 May 1891
- Builder: Cleveland Shipbuilding Company, Cleveland, Ohio
- Cost: $74,993.70
- Launched: 18 December 1891
- Commissioned: 14 April 1892
- Decommissioned: 29 September 1945
- Fate: Sold into commercial service, 19 October 1946; Laid up, 1954

General characteristics
- Type: Lighthouse tender
- Displacement: 975 long tons (991 t)
- Length: 166 ft (51 m)
- Beam: 28 ft (8.5 m) (wl.)
- Draft: 13 ft (4.0 m)
- Propulsion: 2 Scotch-type coal-fired boilers; 1 compound inverted reciprocating steam engine, 600 hp (447 kW)
- Speed: 10.4 knots (19.3 km/h; 12.0 mph)
- Complement: 29
- Armament: None

USLHT Amaranth was a schooner-rigged, twin-screw, wooden-hulled lighthouse tender of United States Lighthouse Service, which served as a vessel of the United States Navy during World War I, and as part of the United States Coast Guard during World War II.

Authorized on 30 August 1890, the contract for the construction of Amaranth was signed on 10 May 1891. Built by the Cleveland Shipbuilding Company of Cleveland, Ohio, at a cost of $74,993.70, the ship was launched on 18 December 1891, the lighthouse tender was accepted by the United States Lighthouse Service on 14 April 1892 and operated on the Great Lakes from her base at Detroit until the United States entered World War I.

== Service history ==
She was originally assigned to duty on Lake Superior and served there until transferred to the operational control of the United States Navy. Transferred to the Navy by the Executive order of 16 April 1917 which placed the Lighthouse Service under the control of the Navy Department, Amaranth was assigned to the 9th Naval District, but continued to serve much as she had done before the war. Following the armistice, she was returned to the jurisdiction of the Department of Commerce with the rest of the Lighthouse Service under an Executive order of 1 July 1919.

On the morning of 23 July 1920, while supplying Passage Island Light Station, Lake Superior, Michigan, the Amaranth struck the rocks under water at the extreme southwesterly point of the island, breaking the shoe and rudder, with the total loss of the latter. Repairs were made by the Port Arthur Shipbuilding Company, Port Arthur, Ontario. She also received new boilers and then returned to service.

In 1939 President Franklin D. Roosevelt merged the Lighthouse Service into the United States Coast Guard which, on 1 November 1941, was ordered to "...operate as a part of the Navy." Now redesignated USCGC Amaranth (WAGL-201), the ship was stationed at Duluth, Minnesota, throughout World War II, and maintained navigational aids on Lake Superior. Following the return of peace, she was decommissioned on 29 September 1945 and sold on 19 October 1946. She served as the privately owned freighter South Wind until being laid up in 1954.
