= Theon (1st century BC) =

Greek philosopher

Theon (Ancient Greek: Θέων; fl. 1st century BC) of Alexandria was a grammarian who taught at Rome in the reigns of the emperors Augustus and Tiberius. He succeeded Areius in this role, and was succeeded by Apion. He was the son of the grammarian Artemidorus of Tarsus and the head of the school at Alexandria.

Theon was the author of a Lexicon to the Greek comedians (Κωμικαὶ λέξεις), which is quoted by Hesychius in the Prooemium to his own Lexicon. It is doubtful whether he was the author of the comic lexicon quoted by the Scholiast to Apollonius Rhodius. He is one of the authors from whose works the Scholia to Aristophanes were derived. A Commentary on the Odyssey by a certain Theon is quoted in the Etymologicum Magnum. In one of the Scholia on Aristophanes, (the authenticity of which is debated) Theon is mentioned as one of the commentators on Apollonius Rhodius. It is possible, however, that one or both of these Commentaries on Homer and Apollonius, should be assigned to Aelius Theon, also of Alexandria.
