= Amhara, Bihar =

Amhara
- village
- Location within Bihar
- Coordinates: 25°52′N 84°58′E
- Country: India
- State: Bihar
- District: Patna

Government
  - Body: Panchayati Raj

Area
  - Total: 14 km^{2} (5.4 sq mi)
- Elevation: 62 m (203 ft)

Population (2011)
  - Total: 13,000 approx
  - Density: 930/km^{2} (2,400/sq mi)

Languages
  - Spoken: Hindi, Magadhi
- Time zone: UTC+5:30 (IST)
- PIN: 801103
- Telephone code: 91-6135
- Sex ratio: 897 ♂/♀
- Literacy: 70.68%

Amhara is a town and a Gram Panchayat in Bihta block of Patna district in the state of Bihar, India. Amhara lies in east of the Sone river and south of Bihta. The village is well connected to major cities with state highways.

== Languages ==
Local language is Magahi, which has the lexical similarity of 71-83% with Hindi[5] (compared to 60% for German and English) and is spoken by about 7,800,000 people in Bihar.

== Education ==
The education infrastructure in the village, albeit, having seen some improvement in the last few years, is still not up to the mark. There are five schools - two primary, two middle and one secondary - currently running in the village with average infrastructure. The school has ordinary teachers, with bare minimum level of knowledge and enthusiasm towards teaching.

== Health ==
Village has a government hospital which has its own building.

== Government ==
The Village elects members to the Panchayat Samiti. The Gram Pradhan is responsible for maintaining law and order in village.

== Economy ==
Agriculture is the main profession, with villagers mostly relying on the growing of paddy and wheat. A few decades ago, sugarcane used to be the primary crop, though rice, wheat and pulses too are grown widely. Amhara is spread over an area of 13 square kilometres (13 km^{2}). In some parts, it rises into irregular uplands and elevated plains, interspersed with detached rocks. In others, it sinks into marshy lowlands, which frequently remain under water during the rainy season. It has a big rice belt area having different kinds of flavored rice. But on account of shutting down of sugar mills, the farmers faced a big blow and had to switch to other crops to earn their daily bread. Recently, due to the dropping water level in the area, a few villagers have resorted to other means of livelihood. The situation becomes even more grim, when the bore-well operators are not even present most of the times to work the equipment.

== Demographics ==
As per election commission of India, Amhara village has a population of 5500 voter (adult population aged above 18). The literacy rate is 70.68%. The sex ratio is 897 which is much lower than the national average of 940. Village population consists of people from Hindu and Islam religion.

=== Folk-songs and folk-dances ===
The seasonal folk-songs commonly sung in the villages are Hori or Phag during spring. Malhar and Kajri in the rainy season. Women have their own songs for special occasions such as sohar (sung on the occasion of the birth of a child ) or Mangla geet (gari) during marriage ceremony. Bhajan-Kirtan in a chorus accompanied with musical is very much liked by inhabitants of the district.

A number of open air performances, combining the rural style of folk music and dancing with some national theme are a regular feature of rural life in the district. Nautanki and dramas based on mythology are often staged and attract large gatherings, particularly in the villages.

There are a number of fairs/melas organized at the different places and Utsavs.

== Transport ==
=== Road transport ===
The available multiple modes of public transport in the village are taxis, cycle rickshaws, auto rickshaws.

Bihta-Kanpa Road passes through Amhara which connects it to Bihta .

=== Railways ===
Bihta railway station is about 5 km from village Amhara.

== College and universities ==
- Netaji Subhas Institute of Technology, Bihta
- Indian Institute of Technology Patna
- National Institute of Electronics and Information Technology
- Footwear Designing and Development Institute
- Netaji Subhash Medical College and Hospital

== Religious places ==
- Maa Van Devi
- Devisthan
- Ram Janki Mandir
- Hanuman Mandir
- Sai Baba Mandir
- Budhwa Mahadev Mandir
- Amreshwarnath mandir
- Balaji & chaar dham mandir

== Industries ==
- Hero Cycles.
- Dugdh Dhara Troika Dairy Products Private Limited
- Apollo Rice Mill
- Raymond
