= HMS Amaranthe =

Three ships of the Royal Navy have borne the name HMS Amaranthe, a form of the French name for the herb genus Amaranth:

- HMS Amaranthe was a 14-gun brig-sloop, previously the French Amarante, launched in 1793. She was captured in 1796 and wrecked in 1799.
- HMS Amaranthe was a Fourth Rate corvette, previously the Dutch Venus captured in 1799 and broken up in 1804.
- HMS Amaranthe was an 18-gun Cruizer-class brig-sloop launched in 1804 and sold in 1815.
