= USS Amaranthus =

Tugboat of the United States Navy

History

United States
- Ordered: as Christiana
- Laid down: date unknown
- Launched: 1864
- Acquired: 1 July 1864
- Commissioned: 12 July 1864
- Decommissioned: 19 August 1865
- Stricken: 1865 (est.)
- Fate: Sold, 5 September 1865

General characteristics
- Displacement: 182 tons
- Length: 117 ft (36 m)
- Beam: 21 ft (6.4 m)
- Draft: 9 ft (2.7 m)
- Depth of hold: 8 ft (2.4 m)
- Propulsion: steam engine; screw-propelled
- Speed: 9.5 knots
- Complement: 40
- Armament: three 24-pounder smoothbore guns

USS Amaranthus was a screw steamer acquired by the Union Navy during the American Civil War. She was used by the Union Navy as a tugboat in support of the Union Navy blockade of Confederate waterways.

== Commissioning ==
Amaranthus a wooden-hulled screw tug built at Philadelphia, Pennsylvania, in 1864 by Bishop, Son, and Company—was purchased by the Navy there as Christiana on 1 July 1864. Renamed Amaranthus and fitted out at the Philadelphia Navy Yard, she was commissioned on 12 July 1864.

== South Atlantic Blockade ==
The Secretary of the Navy assigned the tug to the South Atlantic Blockading Squadron; but she was kept in the Delaware River performing towing duties, and did not join her squadron until she reached Port Royal, South Carolina, on 6 August. She was assigned to the inner cordon of the forces blockading Charleston, South Carolina; but for occasional runs back to Port Royal to carry passengers and dispatches and to receive repairs, she served off that port through the end of the Civil War.

On the night of 9 and 10 September, she sighted a steamer attempting to run out of Charleston and fired repeatedly at the blockade runner which, nevertheless, escaped to sea. Some two-and-one-half months later, she fired upon two incoming steamers which entered the harbor about two hours apart. On both occasions, Confederate shore batteries at Fort Moultrie fired upon the Union blockaders; a spent 10-inch shell struck Amaranthus' starboard counter, damaging the tug sufficiently to require her to enter a nearby inlet for repairs. The patching was quickly completed, and the steamer was back on station three days later.

On 1 February 1865, Acting Ensign William R. Cox, the tug's executive officer, assumed command. Following the collapse of the Confederacy early in the spring of 1865, Amaranthus remained off Charleston into the summer.

== Post-war ==
She departed that port on 10 August and entered the New York Navy Yard on 18 August. Decommissioned there the following day, the tug was sold at public auction on 5 September. She was documented under her original name on 28 December 1865 and served as the merchant tug Christiana until 1900.
