= Ammar =

Ammar may refer to:

- Ammar (name), masculine given name of Arabic origin, meaning "long-lived," "virtuous," "pious".

== Given name ==
- Ammar Abdulhamid, Syrian writer
- Ammar Bakdash (1954–2025), Syrian politician and economist
- Ammar Campa-Najjar, American politician
- Ammar Ibrahim (born 1996), Qatari sprinter
- Ammar bin Humaid Al Nuaimi, Crown Prince of the Emirate of Ajman
- Ammar al-Qurabi, Syrian human rights activist
- Ammar ibn Yasir, one of the companions of the Islamic prophet Muhammad

== Surname ==
- Al-Hasan ibn Ammar, Arab commander and statesman for the Fatimid Caliphate.
- Michael Ammar, American magician
- Muhammad ibn Ammar, Muwallad poet from Silves
- Nabil Ammar (born 1965), Tunisian diplomat and politician
- Rachid Ammar, chief of staff of the Tunisian Armed Forces

== Places ==
- Bani Ammar, a village in Egypt

== See also ==
- Amar (disambiguation)
- Amr (name)
- Omar (disambiguation)
