= Artemidorus Capito =

Physician and grammarian of ancient Greece

Artemidorus Capito(n) (Greek: Ἀρτεμίδωρος ὁ Καπίτων, Artemídōros ho Kapitōn; fl. early 2nd-century AD) was a Greek physician and grammarian at Rome.

== Life ==
Artemidorus was a Greek physician and grammarian active at Rome in the reign of the emperor Hadrian, AD 117–138. He was a relation of Dioscorides, who also edited the works of Hippocrates, and he is frequently mentioned by Galen. (Note: Comment. in Hippocr. "De Humor." vol. xvi. p. 2; Gloss. Hippocr. vol. xix. p. 83, &c.)

== Works ==
He published an edition of the works of Hippocrates, which Galen tells us (Note: Comment. in Hippocr. "De Nat. Hom." vol. xv. p. 21.) was not only much valued by the Emperor himself, but was also much esteemed even in Galen's time. He is, however, accused of making considerable changes in the text, and of altering the old readings and modernising the language.

== Identity ==
Artemidorus may perhaps be the person sometimes quoted simply by the name of Capito, although this is quite uncertain. Capito, a physician, probably lived in the first or second century AD, and appears to have given particular attention to diseases of the eyes. His prescriptions are quoted by Galen (Note: De Compos. Medicam. sec. Loc. iv. 7. vol. xii. p. 731.) and Aëtius. (Note: ii. 3. 77, p. 332.)

== See also ==
- Ancient Greek medicine
- Medicine in ancient Rome
- Galenic corpus
