= Eimar =

Eimar is a given name. Notable people with the name include:

- Eimar O'Duffy (1893–1935), Irish writer
- Eimar Soot (1857–1909), Norwegian engineer and topographer

== See also ==
- Eimear/Eimer/Emer
