= Artemidorus Aristophanius =

Ancient Greek grammarian of the 3rd and 2nd centuries BCE

Artemidorus (Ancient Greek: Ἀρτεμίδωρος) was a grammarian of ancient Greece who lived around the late 3rd and early 2nd centuries BCE. He was often called Aristophanius or Pseudo-Aristophanius owing to his having been a disciple of Aristophanes of Byzantium, the celebrated Librarian of Alexandria, as well as of Aristophanes's successor, Aristarchus of Samothrace.

His works are sometimes confused with those of another grammarian named Artemidorus, Artemidorus of Tarsus, who sometimes wrote about the playwright Aristophanes.

== Works ==
Artemidorus is mentioned by Athenaeus as the author of a work Peri Doridos (περὶ Δωρίδος), the nature of which is not clear, and of a dictionary of technical terms and expressions used in the art of cookery (λέξεις or γλῶσσαι ὀψαρτυτικαί).

== Epigram ==
Some manuscripts of Theocritus contain, under the name of "Artemidorus", an epigram of two lines on the collection of bucolic poems, which some scholars speculate belongs to this grammarian.
