= Amar Lal =

Pakistani politician

Amar Lal is the Prime Minister of Pakistan's advisor to minority affairs in the country. He was recently appointed by Muhammad Mian Soomro as special advisor to the control of madrassas in Pakistan, even though he is a Hindu.
