= Artemidorus of Tarsus =

Ancient Greek grammarian of the 1st century BCE

Artemidorus (Ancient Greek: Ἀρτεμίδωρος) of Tarsus was a grammarian of ancient Greece who lived around the 1st century BCE. He is mentioned by the geographer Strabo as one of the most distinguished persons of Tarsus.

It is not impossible that he may be the same as the one to whose grammatical or lexicographical works reference is made by the Scholiast on Aristophanes, though the work or works here referred to may also belong to Artemidorus Aristophanius.

He was the father of Theon of Alexandria.
