= Artemidorus (physician) =

Ancient Greek physician of the late 3rd century BCE

Artemidorus (Ancient Greek: Ἀρτεμίδωρος) was a physician of ancient Greece, who was quoted by Caelius Aurelianus in his work De morbis acutis et chronicis. From this reference we know he was a native of Side in Pamphylia, and a follower of the anatomist and physician Erasistratus.

His exact century is uncertain, but he must have lived some time between the third century BCE and the second century CE. He may perhaps be the same person as the "Artemidorus" (without any distinguishing epithet) who is quoted by the medical chronicler Galen in his work "On the composition of local remedies", but he is probably not the same person as the "Artemidorus Oionistes" (Ancient Greek: οἰωνιστής, referencing a diviner who predicts the future by reading signs given in the flight and cries of birds) who is mentioned by the same author in his commentaries on the Epidemics of Hippocrates.
