= Amar (2), Kerman =

Coordinates: 28°46′N 58°57′E

Amar عمار (2)
- Village
- Interactive map of Amar
- Country: Iran
- Province: Kerman
- County: Fahraj
- Bakhsh: Negin Kavir
- Rural District: Chahdegal

Population (2006)
  - Total: 54
- Time zone: UTC+3:30 (IRST)
  - Summer (DST): UTC+4:30 (IRDT)

Amar (Persian: عمار (2), also Romanized as ʿAmār (2)) is a village in Chahdegal Rural District, Negin Kavir District, Fahraj County, Kerman Province, Iran. At the 2006 census, its population was 54, in 10 families.
