= Amar, India =

Village in Gujarat state, India

Amar is a village in Porbandar district, which forms a part of the state of Gujarat, India. It lies approximately 20 miles (32 km) from Porbandar on the banks of the river Dudhi. At the 2001 census, the population of the Porbandar district was 536,835.
