= Amar, Lorestan =

Amar امار
- village
- Location within Iran
- Coordinates: 33°25′20″N 47°39′11″E
- Country: Iran
- Province: Lorestan
- County: Kuhdasht
- Bakhsh: Central
- Rural District: Kuhdasht-e Jonubi

Population (2006)
  - Total: 359
- Time zone: UTC+3:30 (IRST)
  - Summer (DST): UTC+4:30 (IRDT)

Amar (Persian: امار, also Romanized as Amār and ‘Ammār; also known as Amār-e Mīānrūd) is a village in Kuhdasht-e Jonubi Rural District, in the Central District of Kuhdasht County, Lorestan Province, Iran. At the 2006 census, its population was 359, in 73 families.
