= Universal Muslim Association of America =

American Shia Muslim organization

- Abbreviation: UMAA
- Formation: September 2002
- Type: Nonprofit organization
- Website: UMAAmerica.org

The Universal Muslim Association of America (UMAA) is an American Shia Muslim organization that organizes conventions and conducts religious education and civic advocacy. Its activities have included national conventions and litigation challenging restrictions on travel to the United States.

== History and conventions ==
According to the organization, UMAA was established in September 2002 by scholars, community organizers and community leaders. Its first annual convention took place in Washington, D.C., in May 2003. The gathering attracted approximately 3,000 participants.

In June 2004, journalist Mary Jacoby described UMAA as an organization of politically active American Shia Muslims.

ProPublica's Nonprofit Explorer records February 2004 as the date on which the Internal Revenue Service issued the organization's tax exemption.

=== Recent conventions ===
The 2024 convention was held from May 24 to 27 in Bethesda, Maryland. According to the Imam Mahdi Association of Marjaeya (I.M.A.M.), its representative, Sayyid M. B. Kashmiri, presented the organization's Blueprint for Shia Muslim Communities in North America. The proposals addressed legal representation, scholarships, financial assistance, social services and higher education.

The 2025 convention took place from October 10 to 12 at the Hilton Toronto/Markham Suites Conference Centre in Ontario. Its theme was "The Global Shia Narrative: Identity, Challenges, and Opportunities". The program included discussions of theology, youth leadership, civic engagement and interfaith dialogue. Shia Waves reported that journalist Mehdi Hasan delivered the keynote address and that more than 5,000 people attended.

In February 2026, UMAA held a three day conference in Karachi, Pakistan. UMAA has also publicized an economic forum with the Economic Pakistan American Council in Karachi and an exhibition of Shia art in the city curated by Laila Tauqeer and Sibte Hasan Haider.

The October 2026 convention was held in Markham, Ontario, from October 9 to 11, with the theme "The Next Chapter: From Identity to Impact". According to the Shia Muslim Foundation, it jointly presented a panel with UMAA on faith, public service and community safety, featuring state legislators Akbar Ali and Alabbas Farhat, Dearborn mayor Abdullah Hammoud and advocate Ali Aljarrah.

== Activities ==
UMAA describes its work as including civic participation, dialogue with other religious communities, professional networking and religious education. Its educational initiatives include English language publications and courses. In 2015, its media division released The Hidden Quran, a video series of introductory lectures on the chapters of the Quran.

=== Public affairs and interfaith dialogue ===
UMAA participated in the 2014 U.S.–Islamic World Forum in Doha, Qatar. The Brookings Institution organized the forum with the State of Qatar under the theme "Islam and Inclusion".

In February 2015, UMAA attended a White House meeting with President Barack Obama. That month, UMAA sponsored a dialogue with the 14th Dalai Lama and Muslim religious and civic leaders at the Park Hyatt Washington. The Development Organization for Societies in Transition hosted the event, which focused on service and included Sheikh Fadhil al-Sahlani.

In February 2026, Business Recorder reported that a joint UMAA and Economic Pakistan American Council delegation met Pakistan's deputy prime minister and foreign minister, Ishaq Dar, in Islamabad. The report described discussion of trade, interfaith relations and ties between the peoples of Pakistan and the United States.

According to the Shia Muslim Foundation, UMAA participated with SMF and Idara e Jaferia in an April 14, 2026 meeting with Senator Chris Van Hollen and his national security staff concerning the security of Shia Muslim communities. SMF also reported that UMAA joined its April 28 meeting with Representative Jamie Raskin to discuss mosque safety and communication with law enforcement agencies.

=== Travel ban litigation ===
In March 2017, UMAA and individual plaintiffs filed Universal Muslim Association of America v. Trump in the United States District Court for the District of Columbia, challenging Executive Order 13780, the Trump administration's revised travel ban. The plaintiffs alleged religious and national origin discrimination and violations of the First and Fifth Amendments. Their arguments included the effect of travel restrictions on American Shia Muslims' access to religious scholars from abroad.

The case was heard alongside a separate challenge brought by Iranian American organizations. In May 2017, Judge Tanya Chutkan deferred a decision on a request to block the order because injunctions issued by courts in Maryland and Hawaii were already in place.
