= List of ancient Greek poets =

This list of ancient Greek poets covers poets writing in the ancient Greek language, regardless of location or nationality of the poet. For a list of modern-day Greek poets, see List of Greek poets.

== A ==
- Adrianus (poet), wrote an epic poem on the history of Alexander the Great, of which only one line is extant.
- Aeschylus /ˈɛskələs/ (Greek: Αἰσχύλος, 525–456 BC), earliest of the three surviving Classical Athenian tragedians.
- Aeschylus of Alexandria, epic poet, 2nd century
- Agathon (Greek Ἀγάθων) (c. 448–400 BC)
- Agathyllus (Gr. Ἀγάθυλλος) elegiac poet from Arcadia, who is quoted by Dionysius of Halicarnassus in reference to the history of Aeneas and the foundation of Rome.
- Alcaeus of Mytilene (c. 620 BC – 6th century BC), lyric poet who supposedly invented the Alcaic verse
- Alcman (also Alkman, Greek Ἀλκμάν, 7th century BC) choral lyric poet from Sparta; earliest representative of the Alexandrinian canon of the Nine lyric poets.
- Alexander Aetolus of Pleuron in Aetolia, poet and man of letters, the only representative of Aetolian poetry, flourished about 280 BC
- Alexandrian Pleiad is the name given to a group of seven Alexandrian poets and tragedians in the 3rd century BC.
- Alexis (c. 375 BC – c. 275 BC), comic poet of the Middle Comedy, born at Thurii and taken early to Athens, where he became a citizen
- Amphis was an Athenian comic poet of uncertain origin from approximately the 4th century BC
- Anacreon (Greek Ἀνακρέων, born c. 570 BC), lyric poet, notable for drinking songs and hymns and included in the canonical list of Nine lyric poets
- Antimachus, of Colophon or Claros, poet and grammarian, flourished about 400 BC
- Antimachus of Teos epic poet said to have observed an eclipse of the sun in 753 BC
- Antipater of Sidon (2nd century BC) writer and poet best known for his list of Seven Wonders of the World
- Antipater of Thessalonica author of more than a hundred epigrams in the Greek Anthology; flourished around 15 BC
- Anyte of Tegea (fl. early 3rd century BC) Arcadian poet, admired for her epigrams and epitaphs
- Apollodorus of Athens (born c. 180 BC) grammarian, writer and historian most famous for a verse chronicle of Greek history from the fall of Troy in the 12th century BC to 144 BC
- Apollonius of Rhodes also known as Apollonius Rhodius (Latin; Greek Ἀπολλώνιος Ῥόδιος Apollōnios Rhodios; born early 3rd century BC — died after 246 BC) was an epic poet, scholar, and director of the Library of Alexandria.
- Aratus (Greek Aratos; c. 315 BC/310 BC – 240 BC) Macedonian Greek didactic poet, known for his technical poetry
- Archestratus (Greek Archestratos; fl. 330 BC) poet of Gela or Syracuse
- Archilochus (Greek: Ἀρχίλοχος; c. 680 BC – c. 645 BC) poet and mercenary
- Arctinus of Miletus epic poet whose reputation is purely legendary, as none of his works survive; traditionally dated between 775 BC and 741 BC
- Aristeas, semi-legendary poet and miracle-worker, a native of Proconnesus in Asia Minor, active c. 7th century BC
- Aristodama (c. 218 BC), poet of ancient Ionia
- Aristophanes, c. 456–386 BC, known as the Father of Comedy
- Asclepiades of Samos epigrammatist, lyric poet, and friend of Theocritus, who flourished about 270 BC
- Asius of Samos, archaic epic
- Aulus Licinius Archias (fl. c. 120 BC–61 BC) poet born in Antioch in Syria (modern Antakya in Turkey)

== B ==
- Bacchylides lyric poet born at Iulis, on the island of Ceos; Eusebius says he flourished in 467 BC
- Besantinus Roman-era poet
- Bianor (poet) author of 22 epigrams from the Greek Anthology
- Bion of Smyrna bucolic poet born at Phlossa near Smyrna; flourished 100 BC
- Boeo author of a hymn about the founding of the temple of Apollo at Delphi
- Burtas (Βούρτας), a poet of uncertain age, wrote in elegiac verse an account of early Roman history

== C ==
- Callimachus (c. 305 BC – c. 240 BC), poet and critic; native of Cyrene and scholar of the Library of Alexandria
- Callinus (also known as Kallinus) of Ephesus in Asia Minor, flourished mid-7th century BC; the earliest known Greek elegiac poet
- Chaeremon Athenian dramatist of the first half of the fourth century BC generally considered a tragic poet
- Charixene
- Chersias of Orchomenus, archaic epic
- Choerilus (tragic poet) Athenian tragic poet, who exhibited plays as early as 524 BC
- Choerilus of Iasus, epic poet of Iasus in Caria, who lived in the 4th century BC.
- Choerilus of Samos, epic poet of Samos, who flourished at the end of the 5th century BC
- Cinaethon of Sparta, a legendary early Greek poet sometimes called the author of the lost epics Oedipodea, Little Iliad and Telegony; Eusebius says that he flourished in 764/3 BC
- Cleanthes (c. 330 BC – c. 230 BC)
- Cleitagora Spartan woman poet mentioned by Aristophanes and Cratinus
- Cleobulina daughter of Cleobulus, known for her riddles
- Cleobulus sixth century BC poet, one of the Seven Sages of Greece
- Cleophon (poet), Athenian tragic poet who flourished in the 4th century BC
- Corinna, poet traditionally attributed to the 6th century BC
- Cratinus poet of Old Comedy
- Cratinus the Younger poet of Middle Comedy
- Creophylus of Samos legendary early Greek singer, native to Samos or Chios, said to have been a contemporary of Homer
- Crobylus possible Middle Comedian, lived some time after 324 BC
- Crinagoras of Mytilene (70 BC – 18 AD)
- Cyclic poets
- Cynaethus (late 6th century BC)

== D ==
- Diagoras the Atheist of Melos, poet and sophist of the 5th century BC
- Dionysius Chalcus (Greek: Διονύσιος ὁ Χαλκοῦς) an ancient Athenian poet and orator

== E ==
- Elephantis (fl. late 1st century BC), poet apparently renowned in the classical world as the author of a notorious (lost) sex manual.
- Epicharmus of Kos flourished sometime between c. 540 and c. 450 BC; a dramatist and philosopher often credited with being one of the first comic writers.
- Epimenides of Knossos (Crete) (Greek: Ἐπιμενίδης), a semi-mythical 6th century BC Greek seer and philosopher-poet.
- Erinna, female contemporary and friend of Sappho; a native of Rhodes, Telos or Tenos; flourished about 600 BC.
- Eubulus (poet), Athenian Middle Comedy poet, flourished 370s and 360s BC.
- Eugammon of Cyrene
- Eumelus of Corinth
- Euphorion of Chalcis (3rd century BC)
- Eupolis (c. 446 BC – c. 411 BC)
- Euripides (c. 480 BC – c. 406 BC), one of the three surviving Classical Athenian tragedians, with 18 (possibly 19) surviving plays.
- Evenus of Paros (5th century BC)

== G ==
- Gorgo, a rival of Sappho

== H ==
- Hedyle (4th century BC)
- Hermesianax of Colophon, elegiac poet of the Alexandrian school, flourished about 330 BC
- Hermippus the one-eyed, Athenian writer of the Old Comedy, flourished during the Peloponnesian War.
- Herodas (3rd century BC)
- Hesiod (mid-8th century BC)
- Hipponax (6th century BC)
- Homer (8th century BC)

== I ==
- Ibycus (Ἴβυκος), lyric poet of Rhegium in Italy, contemporary of Anacreon, flourished in the 6th century BC; one of the Nine lyric poets
- Ion of Chios (c. 490/480 BC – c. 420 BC) dramatist, lyric poet and philosopher, contemporary of Euripides
- Iophon (flourished 428 BC–405 BC), tragic poet, son of Sophocles
- Isyllus poet whose name was rediscovered in the course of excavations on the site of the temple of Asclepius at Epidaurus, where an inscription was found engraved on stone, consisting of 72 lines of verse and preceded by two lines of prose giving this author's name

== L ==
- Lasus, lyric poet of the 6th century BC
- Lesches, a semi-legendary poet and reputed author of the Little Iliad; traditionally a native of Pyrrha in Lesbos; flourished about 660 BC (according to others, about 50 years earlier)
- Likymnios of Chios, dithyrambic poet, probably 4th century BC
- Lycophron, Hellenistic tragic poet

== M ==
- Magnes (comic poet) (5th century BC)
- Megalostrata (poet) Spartan woman poet, known from a fragment of Alcman quoted by Athenaeus
- Melinno, lyric poet, 2nd or 1st century BC.
- Menander (c. 342/41 – c. 290 BC), best-known writer of Athenian New Comedy.
- Menippus of Gadara in Coele-Syria, cynic and satirist, flourished 3rd century BC.
- Mesomedes, lyric poet and composer of the early 2nd century.
- Mimnermus of Colophon, elegiac poet, flourished about 630–600 BC.
- Moero, Hellenistic poet from Byzantium, mother of the tragedian Homerus of Byzantium.
- Moschus, bucolic poet and friend of Aristarchus of Samothrace, born at Syracuse, flourished about 150 BC.
- Myrtis of Anthedon, lyric poet said to have taught Pindar and Corinna.

== N ==
- Naumachius
- Nicander (fl. 2nd century BC)
- Nicarchus (1st century AD)
- Nine lyric poets
- Nonnus
- Nossis

== O ==
- Olen (poet), early poet from Lycia who went to Delos
- Onomacritus, (c. 530 – 480 BC), also known as Onomacritos or Onomakritos, a chresmologue, or compiler of oracles
- Oppian or Oppianus (in Greek, Οππιανος) was the name of the authors of two (or three) didactic poems in Greek hexameters, formerly identified as one poet, but now generally regarded as two:
  - Oppian of Corycus (or Anabarzus) in Cilicia, who flourished in the reign of Marcus Aurelius
  - Oppian of Apamea (or Pella) in Syria. His extant poem on hunting (Cynegetica) is dedicated to the emperor Caracalla, so that it must have been written after 211
- Oroebantius of Troezena

== P ==
- Palladas (flourished 4th century AD) of Alexandria; unknown except for his epigrams in the Greek Anthology
- Panyassis of Halicarnassus (sometimes known as Panyasis), 5th century BC epic poet, wrote the Heracleia and the Ionica
- Parthenius of Nicaea of Nicaea in Bithynia; grammarian and poet taken prisoner in the Mithridatic Wars and carried to Rome in 72 BC. He taught Virgil Greek.
- Peisander of Camirus in Rhodes, epic poet who flourished about 640 BC.
- Phanocles elegiac poet who probably flourished about the time of Alexander the Great.
- Pherecrates (5th century BC), Athenian Old Comedy poet and rough contemporary of Cratinus, Crates and Aristophanes.
- Philemon (poet) (c. 362 BC – c. 262 BC), Athenian New Comedy poet and playwright born either at Soli in Cilicia or at Syracuse in Sicily but moved to Athens some time before 330 BC
- Philitas of Cos (c. 340 – c. 285 BC), Alexandrian poet and critic, founder of the Alexandrian school of poetry
- Philocles, Athenian tragic poet during the 5th century BCE.
- Philoxenus of Cythera (435 BC–380 BC) a dithyrambic poet.
- Phocylides gnomic poet of Miletus, contemporary of Theognis of Megara, born about 560 BC.
- Phrynichus (comic poet), poet of the Old Attic comedy and contemporary of Aristophanes, flourished around 429 BC.
- Phrynichus (tragic poet)
- Philyllius, Athenian comic poet
- Pindar (c. 522 BC – c. 443 BC)
- Plato (comic poet) (fl. c. 400 BC)
- Polyeidos (poet) (fl. c. 400 BC)
- Poseidippus of Pella (c. 310 BC – c. 240 BC)
- Poseidippus of Cassandreia (316 BC – c. 250 BC)
- Pratinas (fl. c. 500 BC)
- Praxilla (5th century BC)

== Q ==
- Quintus Smyrnaeus (c. 4th century AD), Imperial-period poet who wrote the 14-book epic poem Posthomerica.

== R ==
- Rhyanus poet and grammarian, native of Crete, friend and contemporary of Eratosthenes (275—195 BC)
- Rufinus (poet), epigrammatist

== S ==
- Sannyrion, Athenian comic poet of the late 5th century BC.
- Sappho (Attic Greek Σαπφώ, Aeolic Greek Ψάπφω), lyric poet born on the island of Lesbos in the late 7th century BC; died in 570 BC.
- Semonides iambic poet, flourished in the middle of the 7th century BC, native of Samos.
- Simonides of Ceos (c. 556 BC–469 BC), lyric poet born at Ioulis on Kea; named one of the Nine lyric poets.
- Solon (Greek: Σόλων, c. 638 BC–558 BC. Pronounced sŏ'lōn), famous Athenian lawmaker and lyric poet.
- Sophocles (c. 497/6 BC – winter 406/5 BC), one of the three surviving Classical Athenian tragedians, with 7 surviving works.
- Sositheus (fl. c. 280 BC)
- Sotades (3rd century BC)
- Stasinus
- Stesichorus (c. 630 BC – 555 BC)
- Susarion (fl. early 6th century BC)
- Syagrus (poet)

== T ==
- Telecleides poet of comedy in the 5th century BC, and violent opponent of Pericles
- Telesilla (fl. 510 BC) poet, native of Argos
- Terpander of Antissa in Lesbos; poet and citharode who lived about the first half of the 7th century BC
- Theocritus 3rd century BC Doric poet of Bucolics and mimes
- Theodectes (c. 380 BC – c. 340 BCE)
- Theognis of Megara 6th century BC elegiac poet of aphoristic verses
- Thespis (fl. 6th century BC)
- Thestorides of Phocaea
- Timocles
- Timocreon of Rhodes, lyric/sympotic poet 5th century BC and bitter critic of Themistocles
- Tyrtaeus (fl. late 7th century BC) a Spartan elegiac poet (or Athenian), author of martial verses

== X ==
- Xenocles, (Ξενοκλής), or Zenocles, tragedian, flourished 415 BC
- Xenokleides, 4th century BC Athenian poet
- Xenophanes (c. 570 BC – c. 478 BC), philosopher and poet from Colophon

== See also ==
- Ancient Greek literature
- Lists of poets
- List of Modern Greek poets
