= Aeschylus (disambiguation) =

Aeschylus (с. 525/524-c. 456/455 BC) was an Athenian playwright of the 5th century BC, best known for the Oresteia trilogy.

Aeschylus may also refer to:

== People ==
- Aeschylus of Athens, King of Athens from 778 to 755 BC
- Aeschylus of Alexandria, epic poet in the 2nd century
- Aeschylus of Cnidus, contemporary of Cicero, and one of the most celebrated rhetoricians in Asia Minor
- Aeschylus of Rhodes, governor of that city after its conquest by Alexander the Great

== Other uses ==
- 2876 Aeschylus, asteroid named after the playwright

== See also ==
- Escalus
