= Roma (personification) =

Female deity in ancient Roman religion, personification of Rome

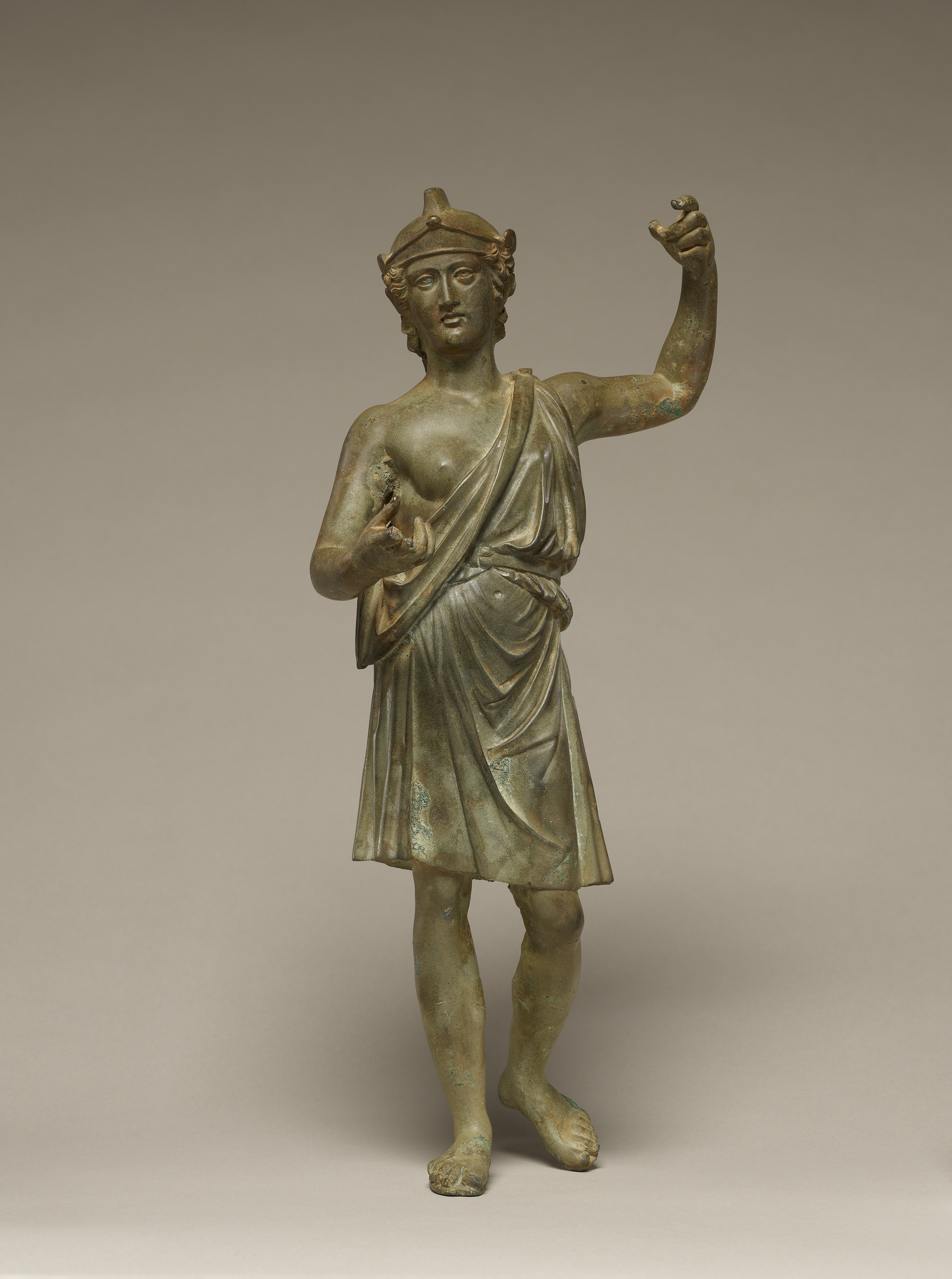
Bronze statuette of Roma or Virtus. She originally held a spear in her left hand and if Roma, a figure of Victory in her right, c. 50–75 AD. Getty Villa

In ancient Roman religion, Roma was a female deity who personified the city of Rome and, more broadly, the Roman state. She was created and promoted to represent and propagate certain of Rome's ideas about itself, and to justify its rule. She was portrayed on coins, sculptures, architectural designs, and at official games and festivals. Images of Roma had elements in common with other goddesses, such as Rome's Minerva, her Greek equivalent Athena and various manifestations of Greek Tyche, who protected Greek city-states; among these, Roma stands dominant, over piled weapons that represent her conquests, and promising protection to the obedient. Her "Amazonian" iconography shows her "manly virtue" (virtus) as fierce mother of a warrior race, augmenting rather than replacing local goddesses. On some coinage of the Roman Imperial era, she is shown as a serene advisor, partner and protector of ruling emperors. In Rome, the Emperor Hadrian built and dedicated a gigantic temple to her as Roma Aeterna ("Eternal Rome"), and to Venus Felix ("Venus the Bringer of Good Fortune"), emphasising the sacred, universal and eternal nature of the empire.

Roma's official cult served to advance the propagandist message of Imperial Rome. In Roman art and coinage, she is usually depicted in military form, with helmet and weapons. In Rome's eastern provinces, she was often shown with mural crown or cornucopia, or both. Her image is rarely found in a commonplace or domestic context. Roma was probably favoured by Rome's high-status Imperial representatives abroad, rather than the Roman populace at large. She was depicted on silver cups, arches, and sculptures, including the base of the column of Antoninus Pius. She survived into the Christian period as a personification of the Roman state. Her depiction seated with a shield and spear later influenced that of Britannia, personification of Britain.

== Republican era ==
=== Identity and iconography ===
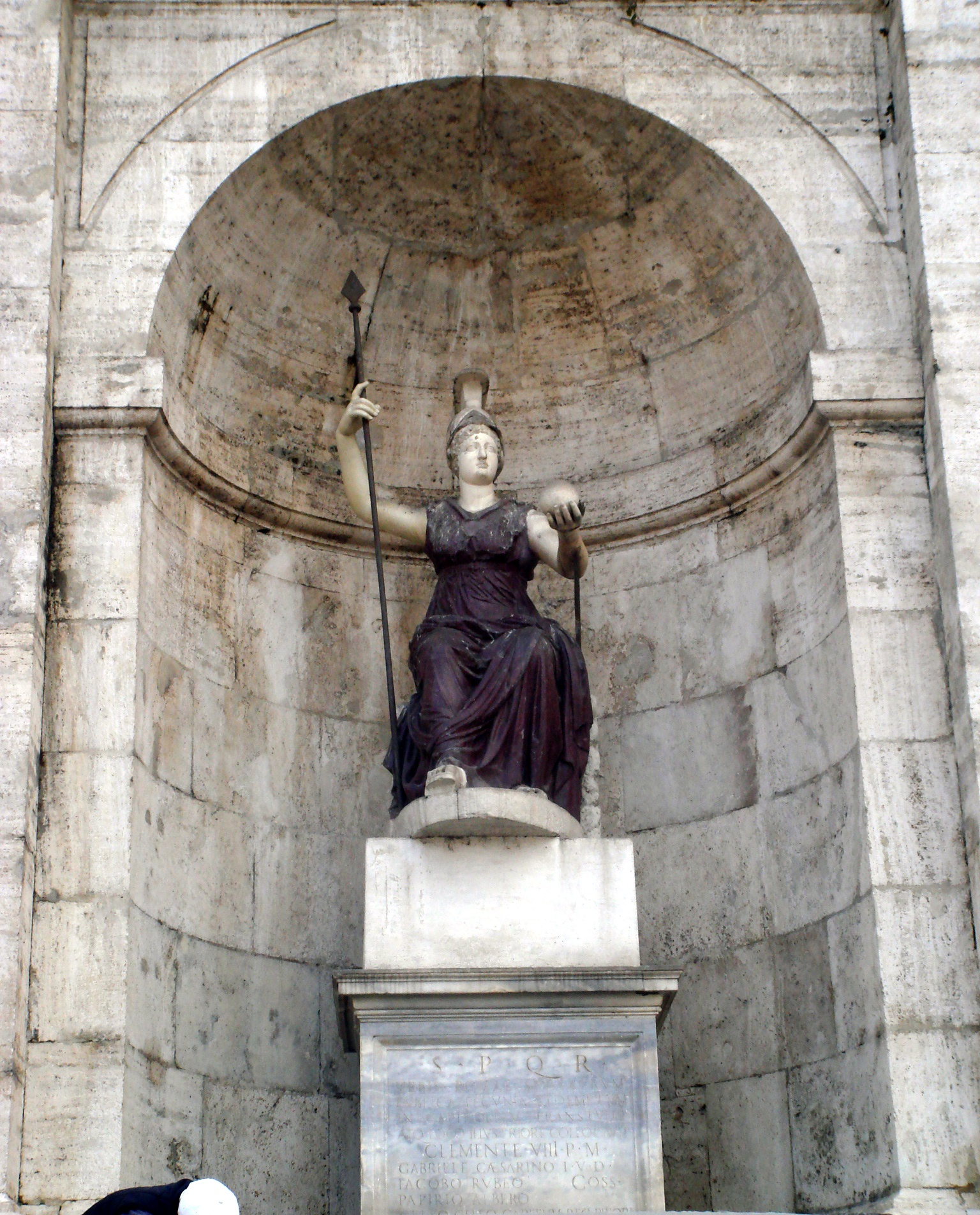
Roma in the Piazza del Campidoglio; adapted from a statue of Minerva by the addition of weapons, in the modern era

A helmeted figure on Roman coins of 280–276 and 265–242 BC is sometimes interpreted as Roma but the identification is contestable. Other early Roman coinage shows a warlike "Amazon" type, possibly Roma but in Mellor's opinion, more likely a genius than dea (goddess). During the late Second Punic War and the Pyrrhic War, Rome issued coins with a Phrygian helmeted head; some are stamped Roma. In later coin issues, Roma wears varieties of the Attic helmet, the standard pattern for Roman army officers. In cases where clear coin legends are lacking, identification has been unresolved. Other female members of Rome's official pantheon were also helmeted, including Bellona, and Minerva, the latter being equivalent to Greek Athena, who is believed by some scholars to be Roma's original.

The earliest, more-or-less unequivocal coin identification of Roma is a silver stater of c. 275 BC issued by Rome's ethnically Greek allies at Locri, on the Italian peninsula. It shows an enthroned woman with shield and other war-gear, clearly labelled as Roma. Another woman, labelled as Pistis (Greek equivalent to Roman Fides, or "good faith"), stands before Roma with a crown of leaves raised above her head. A Roman denarius of 114/115 shows Roma with Romulus, Remus and the she-Wolf, the mythological beast who fostered them, and nourished them with her milk; the coin image implies that Roma has protected and nourished Rome since its very foundation. Her "Amazonian" appearance recalls the fierce, barbaric, bare-breasted Amazons who fought in the Trojan War alongside the Trojans, supposed ancestors of the Romans. In the late Republican and early Imperial era, Roman literature presents Roma as one of the Roman people's several "Great Mothers", who included Venus and Cybele. Ennius personified the "Roman fatherland" as Roma: for Cicero, she was the "Roman state", but neither of these are dea Roma. Though her Roman ancestry is possible – perhaps merely her name and the ideas it evoked, according to Mellor – she emerges as a Greek deity, whose essential iconography and character were already established in Italy, Magna Graecia and Rome.

=== Earliest cults ===
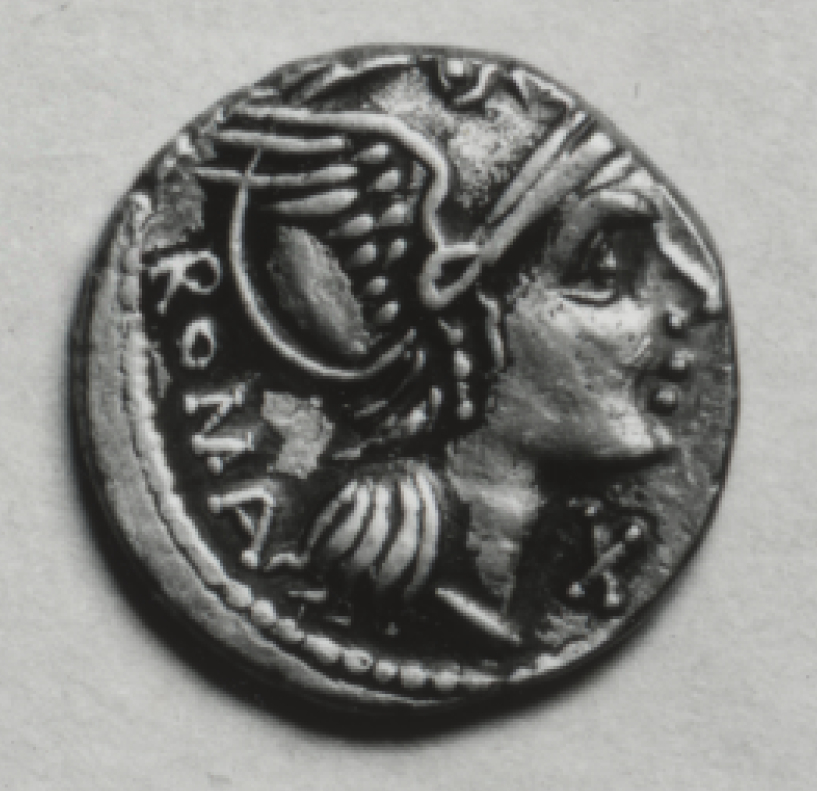
Roma on a denarius, 93–92 BC (Walters Art Museum)

The earliest certain cult to dea Roma was established at Smyrna in 195 BC, probably to mark Rome's successful alliance against Antiochus III. Mellor has proposed her cult as a form of religio-political diplomacy which adjusted traditional Graeco-Eastern divine monarchic honours to Republican mores: divine honours to the divine personification of the Roman state acknowledged the authority of its offices, Republic and city, but did not displace local, Greek cult to individual Roman benefactors. (Note: The Hellenophile general Flamininus was given divine honours jointly with Roma for his military achievements on behalf of Greek allies: Plutarch, Flamininus, 16 (Bill Thayer, University of Chicago, accessed December 24, 2022), gives the ending lines of what he describes as a lengthy Chalcidian hymn to Zeus, Roma and Flamininus.)

Democratic city-states such as Athens and Rhodes accepted Roma as analogous to their traditional cult personifications of the demos (ordinary people). In 189 BC, Delphi and Lycia instituted festivals in her honour. Roma as "divine sponsor" of athletics and pan-Hellenic culture seems to have dovetailed neatly into a well-established and enthusiastic festival circuit, and temples to her were outnumbered by her civic statues and dedications. In 133 BC, Attalus III bequeathed the people and territories of Pergamon to Rome, as to a trusted ally and protector. The Pergamene bequest became the new Roman province of Asia, and Roma's cult spread rapidly within it.

In contrast to her putative "Amazonian" Roman original, Greek coinage reduces the ferocity of her image, and depicts her in the "dignified and rather severe style" of a Greek goddess, often wearing a mural crown, or sometimes a Phrygian helmet. She is occasionally bareheaded. In this and later periods, she was often associated with Zeus (as guardian of oaths) and Fides (the personification of mutual trust). (Note: The Roman cult to Fides was instituted in the Late Republic: Cicero, De Natura Deorum, 2. 61.) Her Eastern cult appealed for Rome's alliance and protection. A panegyric to her survives, in five Sapphic stanzas attributed to the Greek poet Melinno, who claims that she is the daughter of Ares and celebrates her fierce commitment to her offspring and proteges.

Hail, Roma, daughter of Ares, golden-belted warlike queen, you whose earthly home is Olympus the eternally unshattered. Ancient Fate gave to you alone the unbroken glory of royal command, so that the strength to rule is in your hands. Under your strong-strapped yoke the chests of the earth and the gray sea are harnessed. You safely steer the cities of the people. And though mighty time strikes down all things and reshapes life into many different forms, for you alone the wind that blows to the uttermost ends of power does not shift. For indeed you bear the strongest great warriors of all, just like the bountiful crop yielded by Demeter's fields.

At this time, her cult in Republican Rome and its Eastern coloniae was virtually non-existent. In her "Amazonian" type, her usually single bare breast signifies the same boldness and fiercely maternal, nurturing virtues. In Hellenistic religious tradition, gods were served by priests and goddesses by priestesses but Roma's priesthood was male, perhaps in acknowledgment of the virility of Rome's military power. Priesthood of the Roma cult was competed among the highest ranking local elites. (Note: In the East – as later in the provincial West – Roma's priests were probably elected.)

== Imperial era ==
The assassination of Julius Caesar led to his apotheosis and cult as a State divus in Rome and her Eastern colonies. Caesar's adopted heir Augustus ended Rome's civil war and became princeps ("leading man") of the Republic, and in 30/29 BC, the koina of Asia and Bithynia requested permission to honour him as a living divus. Republican values held monarchy in contempt, and despised Hellenic honours – Caesar had fatally courted both – but an outright refusal might offend loyal provincials and allies. A cautious formula was drawn up: non-Romans could only offer him cult as divus jointly with dea Roma. Roma had an Imperial role as consort to the emperor and mother of the entire Roman people. In Greek city-states her iconography would have merged with that of the local Tyche; this usually included a mural crown and cornucopia. Roma's seated pose, seen in more than half the known depictions, was also used for Athena, the Hellenic equivalent of Roman Minerva. Like Athena, Roma represents "manly" female virtues, a personification of an empire built on conquest. From here on, Roma increasingly took the attributes of an Imperial or divine consort to the Imperial divus, but some Greek coin types show her as a seated or enthroned authority, and the Imperial divus standing upright as if her supplicant or servant.

In the western part of the Empire, the foundation of the Imperial cult centre at Lugdunum introduced Roman models for provincial and municipal assemblies and government, a Romanised lifestyle, and an opportunity for local elites to enjoy the advantages of Roman citizenship through election to Imperial cult priesthood. Its ara (altar) was dedicated to Roma and Augustus. (Note: The cult altar was inaugurated in 10 or 12 BC: Fishwick favours 12 BC as both practical and a particularly auspicious date for Augustus.) Thereafter, Roma's presence is well attested by inscriptions and coinage throughout the Western provinces. Literary sources have little to say about her, but this may reflect her ubiquity rather than neglect: in the early Augustan era, as in Greece, she may have been honoured above her living Imperial consort. (Note: Emperors were not deified until their death. Fishwick sees the persistence of Roma's Hellenic seniority as dea (over the Augustan divus) in Western Imperial cult.) (Note: Mellor finds Roma an essential companion to the Augustan and later Imperial divi, based on the surmise of Imperial cult as less one of obedience than a Romano-Hellenic framework for co-operation and acculturation: emperors of the Principate claimed to represent and sustain the "senate and people of Rome", not to dominate them.) (Note: Priests at the Lugdunum complex were known by the Greek title of sacerdos. Most others were flamen who – contrary to Roman tradition – served a number of deities. In general, female Imperial cult honorands (such as the living or deceased and deified Empress and state goddesses) were served by a priestess. Some were wife to the cult priest, but most may have been elected in their own right. One priestess is rather confusedly flamina sive sacerdos – Western Imperial cults show remarkably liberal interpretations of cult and priesthood: some appear to be unique. However, with only one possible exception (at Toulouse) dea Roma was served by priests, as in her Hellenic cult.)

In provincial Africa, one temple to Roma and Augustus is known at Leptis Magna and another at Mactar. On the Italian peninsula, six have been proven – Latium built two, one of them privately funded. During the reign of Tiberius, Ostia built a grand municipal temple to Roma and Augustus.

In the city of Rome itself, the earliest known state cult to dea Roma was combined with cult to Venus at the Hadrianic Temple of Venus and Roma. This was the largest temple in the city, probably dedicated to inaugurate the reformed festival of Parilia, which was known thereafter as the Romaea after the Eastern festival in Roma's honour. The temple contained the seated, fully draped, Hellenised and highly influential image of dea Roma – the Palladium in her right hand symbolised Rome's eternity. In Rome, this was a novel realisation. Greek interpretations of Roma as a dignified deity had transformed her from a symbol of military dominance to one of Imperial protection and gravitas.

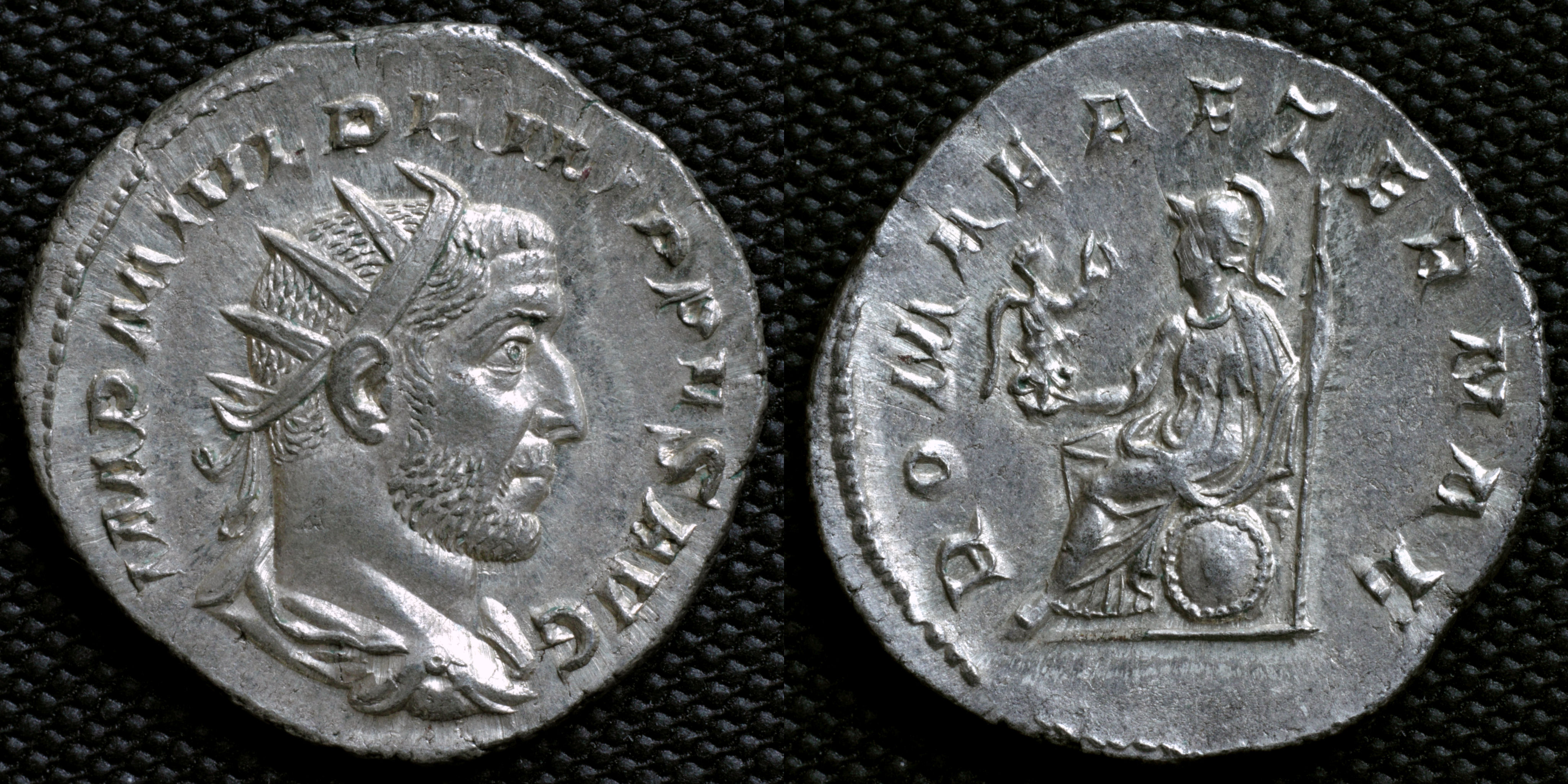

First side of the image: O: draped and cuirassed bust with radiate crown IMP M IVL PHILIPPVS AVG
Second side of the image: R: Roma seated left on shield, holding Victory and scepter ROMAE AETERNAE
silver antoninianus struck by Philip the Arab in Rome, AD 247; ref.: RIC 44b

Following the defeat of Clodius Albinus and his allies by Septimius Severus at Lugdunum, Roma was removed from the Lugdunum cult ara to the temple, where along with the Augusti she was co-opted into a new formulation of Imperial cult. Fishwick interprets the reformed rites at Lugdunum as those offered any paterfamilias by his slaves. It is not known how long this phase lasted, but it appears to have been a unique development. In a later, even more turbulent era, a common coin type of Probus shows him in the radiate solar crown of the Dominate: the reverse offers Rome's Temple of Venus and dea Roma. While Probus' image shows his monarchic Imperium, Roma displays his claims to restoration of Roman tradition and Imperial unity.

== In arts, craft and literature of the Imperial era ==
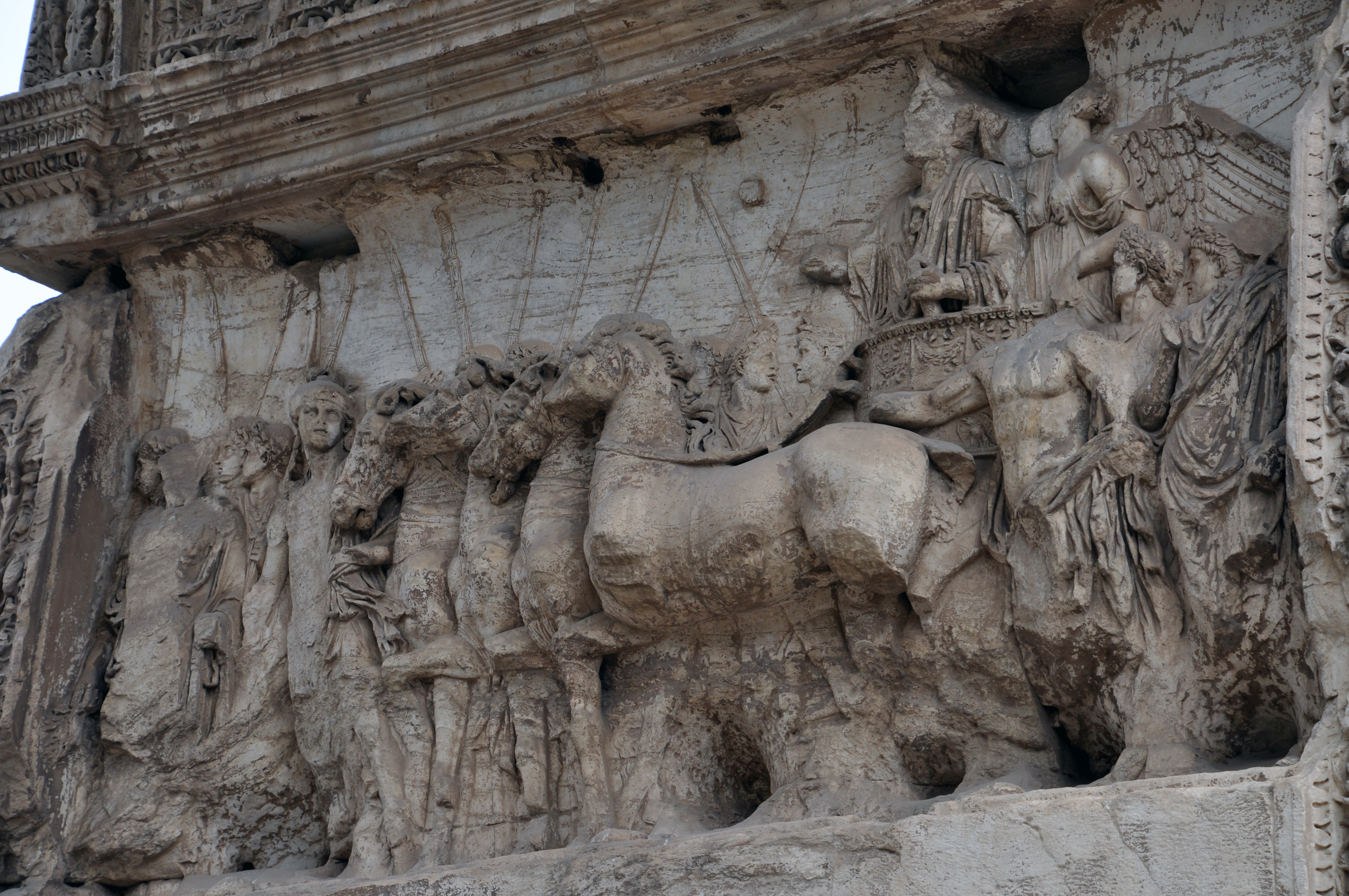
Roma escorting the emperor in a chariot on the Arch of Titus.

Lucan's poem, Pharsalia, depicts Roma as a strong woman who represents Roman values. The poem follows the civil war between Julius Caesar and the forces of the Roman Senate, led by Pompey the Great. Caesar, having repudiated Roma and her values, ends up with a mistress in Egypt (Cleopatra), having set his own destiny on a path to eventual self-destruction. The poet identifies Roma (the res publica) with the idealised Roman matrona. A man who rejects either one cannot be truly Roman.

Roma is represented as a major character on the silver Boscoreale cup. She stands helmeted, prepared for war, vigilant but at peace. Her foot rests on a "weapon pile"; trophies of past conflict. She converses with a young, standing male usually identified as the genius of the Roman people, who appears to be waiting to speak with the seated emperor (probably Augustus). In the Gemma Augustea sculpture by Dioscurides, Roma sits beside Augustus in military apparel.

On the Arch of Titus (1st-century CE), the arch of Septimius Severus and the arch of Constantine, Roma accompanies the emperor in his chariot, as his escort.

Figures of Roma are rare in a domestic context, throughout the Empire, and in the provinces they may have been associated with Roman residents. In Corinth, a statuette of Roma was found, along with those of other deities, in a domestic shrine in the Panayia Domus, tentatively dated to the 2nd or 3rd century AD. The deities were smaller than life but all were well-crafted and most had traces of gilding: the Roma figure sits on a backless chair, and wears a triple-crested war-helmet and a peplum. She has one breast exposed and wears shin-high openwork boots, based on a "draped Amazon", warlike type. Sterling speculates an official connection between the owners of this Roma figure and the nearby Corinthian Temple 1.

== In the Book of Revelation ==
In the Book of Revelation, the letter to the church in Pergamum (2:12–17) warns against Christian involvement in eating food sacrificed to idols, potentially a reference to the Roman imperial cult which was popular in Pergamum in the era and worshipped the deified Augustus and the goddess Roma. Later, the book introduces a villainous character called the Whore of Babylon, generally considered a reference to Rome, the dominant power of the era, and potentially an outright caricature of Roma:

The woman was clothed in purple and scarlet, and adorned with gold and jewels and pearls, holding in her hand a golden cup full of abominations and the impurities of her fornication; and on her forehead was written a name, a mystery: "Babylon the great, mother of whores and of earth’s abominations." And I saw that the woman was drunk with the blood of the saints and the blood of the witnesses to Jesus. (...) The woman you saw is the great city that rules over the kings of the earth.

— Revelation 17:4-6; 18 (NRSV)

Additionally, the Whore of Babylon is described as riding a beast with seven heads, and the book says that "the seven heads are seven mountains on which the woman is seated," typically understood as the seven hills of Rome. An image of Dea Roma on a sestertius of Emperor Vespasian shows her reclining on Rome's seven hills with various accoutrements; in this interpretation, the readers of the Book of Revelation, familiar with the iconography of Roman coins, would understand who was being referred to. Rather than Roma's depiction as an elegant and regal woman bedecked in jewels and taming a wild animal in conquest in Roman art, the author of Revelation sees Roma as a corrupt and evil force "drunk with blood."

While most scholars recognize that Babylon is a cipher for Rome, they also say that Babylon represents more than just the Roman city of the first century. Craig Koester writes that "the whore is Rome, yet more than Rome". It "is the Roman imperial world, which in turn represents the world alienated from God".

== Modern times ==
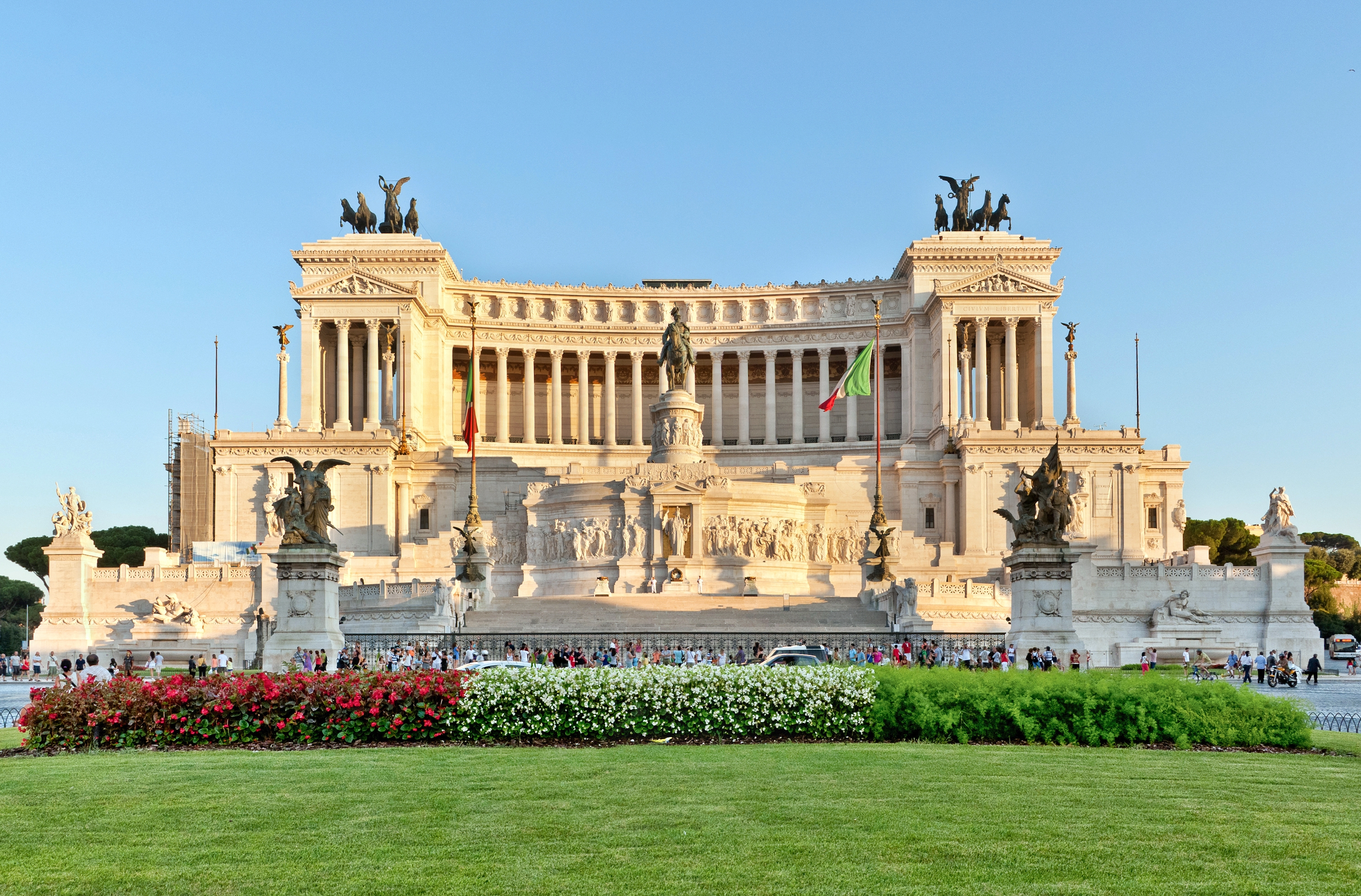
Altare della Patria in Rome

The Altar of the Fatherland is the most famous part of the Altare della Patria in Rome and is the one with which it is often identified. On the top of the entrance stairway, it was designed by the Brescian sculptor Angelo Zanelli, who won a competition specially held in 1906. It is formed from the side of the Tomb of Italian Unknown Soldier that faces the outside of the building (the other side, which faces inside the Vittoriano, is in a crypt), from the sacellum of the statue of Roma (which is exactly above the tomb of the Unknown Soldier) and two vertical marble reliefs that descend from the edges of the aedicula containing the statue of the goddess Rome and which run downwards laterally to the tomb of the Unknown Soldier.

The statue of Roma present at the Vittoriano interrupted a custom in vogue until the 19th century, by which the representation of this subject was with exclusively warlike traits. Angelo Zanelli, in his work, decided to further characterize the statue by also providing the reference to Athena, Greek goddess of wisdom and the arts, as well as of war. The great statue of the deity emerges from a golden background. The presence of the goddess Roma in the Vittoriano underlines the irremissible will of the Unification of Italy patriots to have Rome as the capital of Italy, an essential concept, according to the common feeling, from the history of the peninsula and the islands of Italian culture.

== Legacy ==
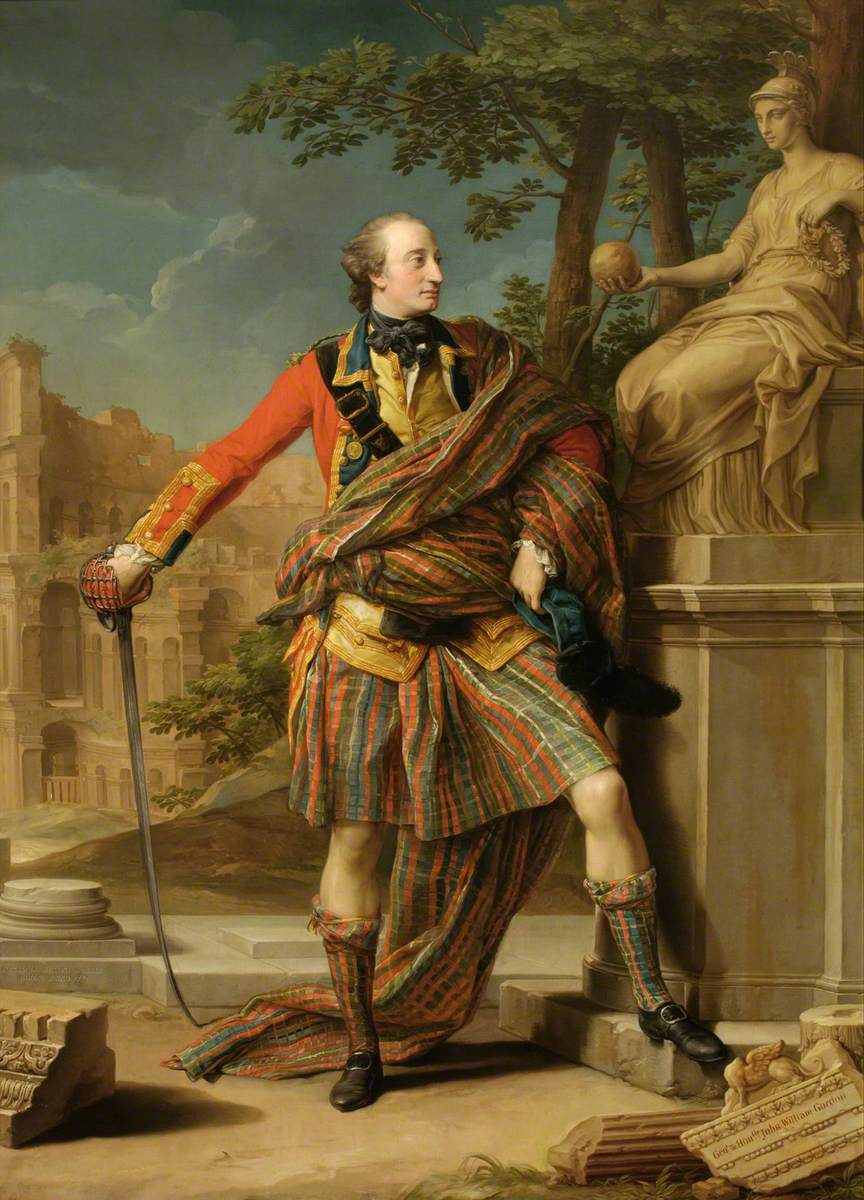
Portrait of William Gordon by Pompeo Batoni, 1766. A statue of Roma is shown prominently in this Grand Tour painting

Ronald Mellor wrote in the introduction to his work on Roma, summing up her influence, that "As personification, as goddess or as symbol, the name Roma stretches from classical Greece to Mussolini's Fascist propaganda ... Roma has been seen as a goddess, a whore, a near-saint, and as the symbol of civilization itself. She remains the oldest continuous political-religious symbol in Western civilization."

== Bibliography ==
- Beard, Mary; Price, Simon; North, John A. (1998). Religions of Rome: Volume 1·A History. Cambridge University Press. ISBN 0-521-31682-0.
- Fishwick, Duncan. The imperial cult in the Latin West: studies in the ruler cult of the western provinces of the Roman Empire. Brill, 1987–2005.
- Mellor, Ronald J. (1991) [1981]. "The Goddess Roma". In Haase, Wolfgang; Temporini, Hildegard (eds.). Aufstieg und Niedergang der romischen Welt. de Gruyter. pp. 950–1030. ISBN 3-11-010389-3.
