= Gorgo =

Gorgo may refer to:

- Gorgons; the term "Gorgo" is the singular
- Another name for Medusa, one of the three monstrous Gorgons in Greek mythology
- Gorgo, one of the dogs that tore apart Actaeon
- Gorgo (mythology), a woman of king Aegyptus
- Gorgo (poet), rival of Sappho
- Gorgo, Queen of Sparta (6th–5th century BC), queen of Sparta, daughter of king Cleomenes I and wife of king Leonidas I
- Görgö, the Hungarian name for the town of Spišský Hrhov, Slovakia
- Gorgo, a frazione (subdivision) of the comune of Latisana, Italy
- Gorgo (film), a 1961 film, or its protagonist, the giant monster Gorgo
- 681 Gorgo, an asteroid
- Gorgo, a former brush-footed butterfly genus now included in Erebia
- Gorgo, a character in the anime The Wonderful Adventures of Nils
