= Ephippus of Olynthus =

Ephippus (Ancient Greek: Ἔφιππος) of Olynthus was an Ancient Greek historian of Alexander the Great.

It is commonly believed, though no reason is assigned, that Ephippus lived about or shortly after the time of Alexander. There is however a passage in Arrian which would determine the age of Ephippus very accurately, if it could be proved that the Ephippus there mentioned is identical with the historian. Arrian says, that Alexander before leaving Egypt appointed Aeschylus of Rhodes and Ephippus ton Chalkideôs, superintendents (episkopoi) of the administration of Egypt. The reading ton Chalkideôs, though adopted by the recent editors of Arrian, is not in all MSS., and some editions read Chalkidona or Chalkêdona; but if we might amend Chalkideaa, we should have reason for supposing that the person mentioned by Arrian is the same as Ephippus of Olynthus, for Olynthus was the principal town in Chalcidice, and Ephippus might just as well be called a native of Olynthus as of Chalcidice.

If the Ephippus then in Arrian be the same as the historian, he was a contemporary of Alexander and survived him for some time, for he wrote an account of the king's burial. The work of Ephippus is distinctly referred to by Athenaeus only, though Diodorus and others also seem to have made use of it. Athenaeus calls it in some passages peri tês Alexandron kai Hêphaistiônos metallagês, and in others he has taphês or teleutês instead of metallagês, so that at all events we must conclude that it contained an account of the burial of Alexander as well as of his death.

From the few fragments still extant, it would appear that Ephippus described more the private and personal character of his heroes than their public careers. It should be remarked that by a singular mistake Suidas in his article Ephippus gives an account of Ephorus of Cumae.

Pliny mentions one Ephippus among the authorities he consulted upon plants, and it is generally believed that he is a different person from our historian; but all the writers whom Pliny mentions along with him, belong to the period of Alexander, so that it is by no means improbable that he may be Ephippus of Olynthus. All that is known about Ephippus and the fragments of his work, is collected by R. Geier, in his Alexandri Magni Histor. Scriptores, actate suppares.
