= Syagrus =

Syagrus may refer to:

== People ==
- Syagrus (legendary poet), a legendary Greek oral poet
- Syagrus, a Lacedaemonian envoy sent to Gelon, a tyrant in Sicily, to seek his support against Xerxes
- Syagrus, a general of the Aetolians

== Other ==
- Syagrus, the ancient name of Cape Fartak (Ra's Fartak) in Arabia
- Syagrus (plant), a genus of palm trees
- Syagrus (beetle), a genus of beetle in the family Chrysomelidae, the leaf beetles
