= Hymen (god) =

Ancient Greek god of marriage ceremonies

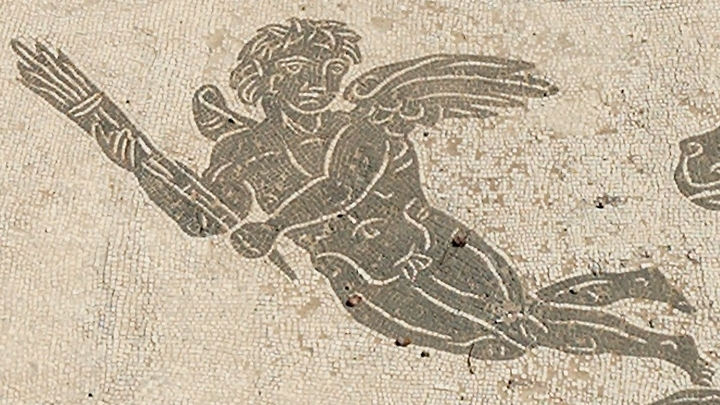
Hymen depicted on a Roman mosaic, Ostia Antica

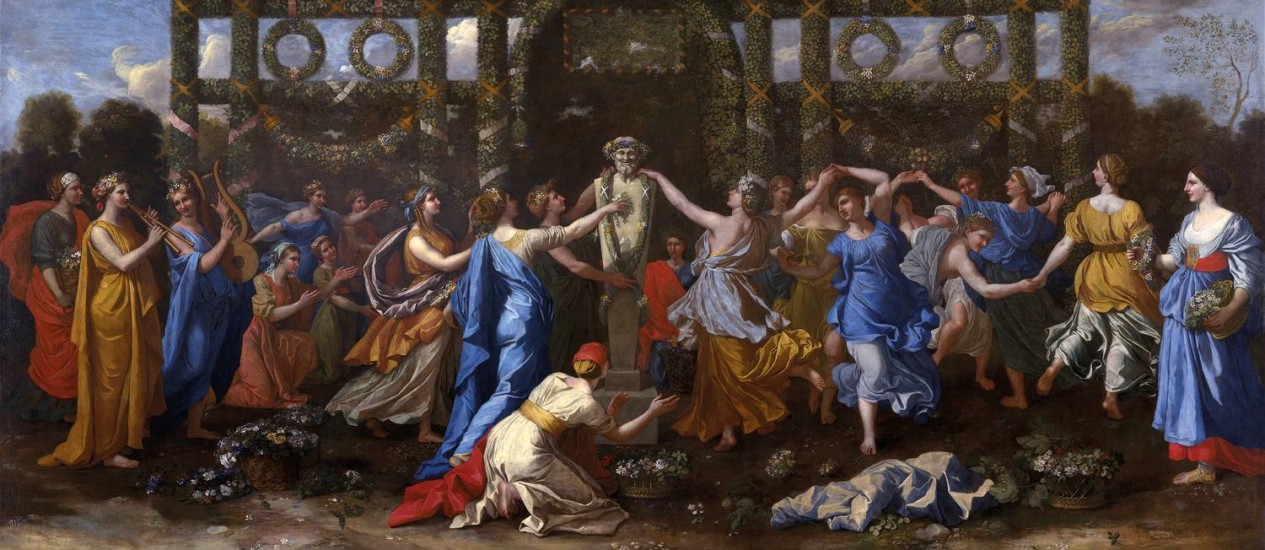
Nicolas Poussin, Hymenaios Disguised as a Woman During an Offering to Priapus, 1634, São Paulo Museum of Art

In Greek mythology, Hymen (Ancient Greek: Ὑμήν, romanized: Humḗn), Hymenaios or Hymenaeus (Ὑμέναιος), is a god of marriage ceremonies who inspires feasts and song. Related to the god's name, a hymenaios is a genre of Greek lyric poetry that was sung during the procession of the bride to the groom's house in which the god is addressed, in contrast to the Epithalamium, which is sung at the nuptial threshold.

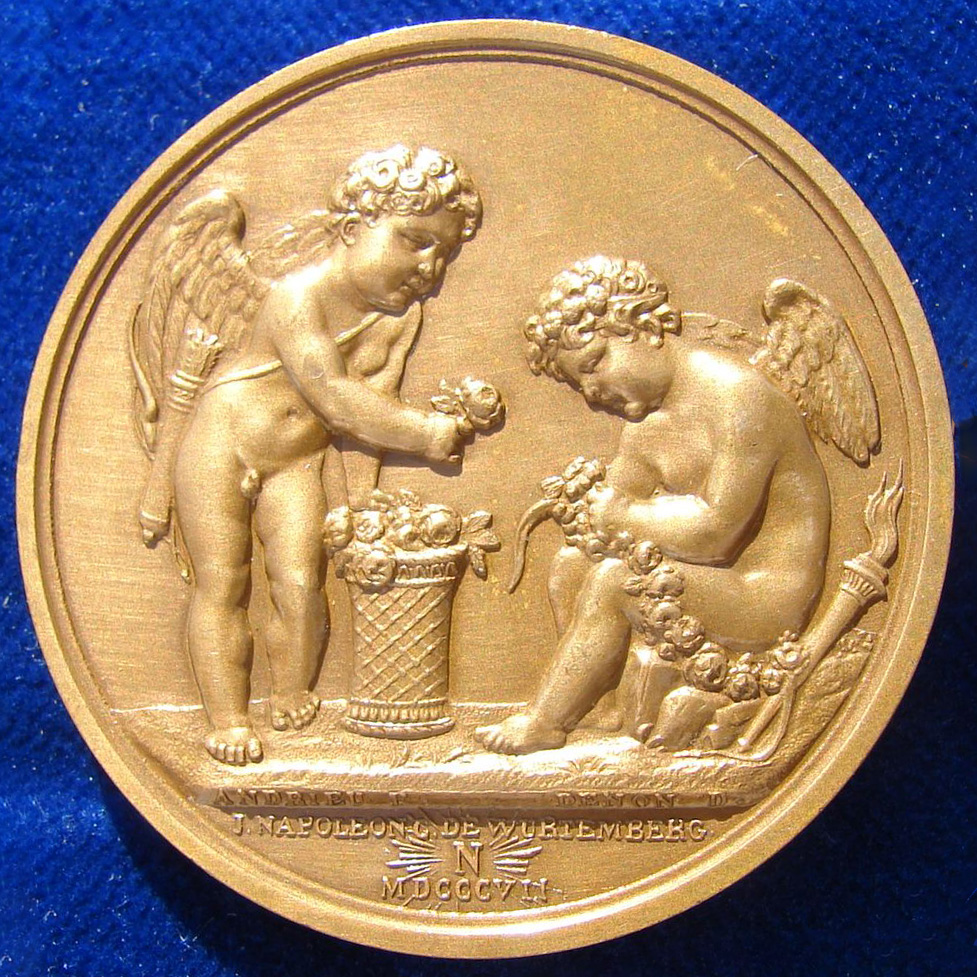
Cupid standing (left), and Hymen sitting (right). Hymen's burning torch on a Napoleonic wedding medal of 1807. It commemorates the marriage of Napoleon's youngest brother Jérôme Bonaparte to Princess Catharina of Württemberg at Fontainebleau.

== Etymology ==
Hymen's name is derived from the Proto-Indo-European root *syuh₁-men-, "to sew together," hence, "joiner;" it is also recorded in Doric Greek as Ὑμάν (Humán). The term hymen was also used for a thin skin or membrane such as that which covers the vaginal opening and was traditionally supposed to be broken by sexual intercourse after a woman's (first) marriage. The membrane's name was, therefore, not directly connected to that of the god, but they shared the same root and in folk etymology were sometimes supposed to be related.

== Function and representation ==
Hymen is supposed to attend every wedding. If he did not, the marriage would supposedly prove disastrous and so the Greeks would run about calling his name aloud. He presided over many of the weddings in Greek mythology, for all the deities and their children.

Hymen is celebrated in the ancient marriage song of unknown origin (called a Hymenaios) Hymen o Hymenae, Hymen delivered by Catullus.

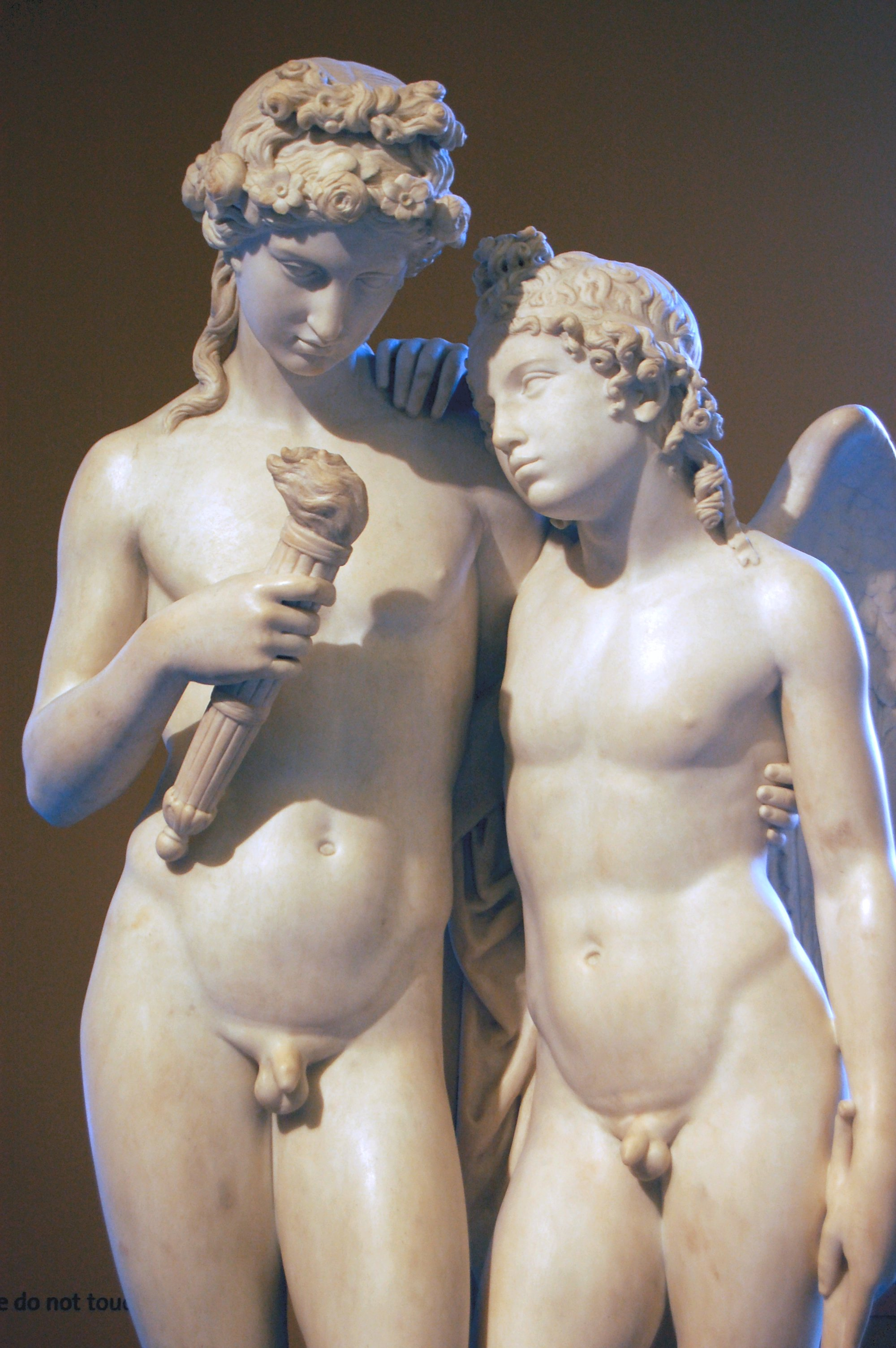
Cupid Rekindling the Torch of Hymen, a sculpture by George Rennie

== Mythology ==
Hymen was mentioned in Euripides's The Trojan Women in which Cassandra says:

Bring the light, uplift and show its flame! I am doing the god's service, see! I making his shrine to glow with tapers bright. O Hymen, king of marriage! blest is the bridegroom; blest am I also, the maiden soon to wed a princely lord in Argos. Hail Hymen, king of marriage!

Hymen also appears in the work of the 7th- to 6th-century BCE Greek poet Sappho (translation: M. L. West, Greek Lyric Poetry, Oxford University Press):

High must be the chamber –
Hymenaeum!
Make it high, you builders!
A bridegroom's coming –
Hymenaeum!
Like the War-god himself, the tallest of the tall!

Hymen is most commonly the son of Apollo and one of the Muses, Clio or Calliope or Urania or Terpsichore. In Seneca's play Medea, he is stated to be the son of Dionysus. Servius calls him the son of Dionysus by Aphrodite.

Other stories give Hymen a legendary origin. In one of the surviving fragments of the Megalai Ehoiai attributed to Hesiod, it's told that Magnes "had a son of remarkable beauty, Hymenaeus. And when Apollo saw the boy, he was seized with love for him, and wouldn't leave the house of Magnes".

Aristophanes' Peace ends with Trygaeus and the Chorus singing the wedding song, with the repeated phrase "Oh Hymen! Oh Hymenaeus!", a typical refrain for a wedding song.

According to Athenaeus, Likymnios of Chios, in his Dithyrambics, says that Hymenaeus was the erastes of Argynnus, a boy from Boeotia.

Maurus Servius Honoratus, in his commentaries on Virgil's Eclogues, mentions that Hesperus, the Evening Star, inhabited Mount Oeta in Thessaly and that there he had loved the young Hymenaeus, son of Apollo with a similar singing voice, which he was said to have lost at the wedding of Dionysus and Ariadne.

=== Later story of origin ===
According to a later romance, Hymen was an Athenian youth of great beauty but low birth who fell in love with the daughter of one of the city's wealthiest women. Since he could not speak to her or court her because of his social standing, he instead followed her wherever she went.

Hymen disguised himself as a woman in order to join one of those processions, a religious rite at Eleusis in which only women went. The assemblage was captured by pirates, Hymen included. He encouraged the women and plotted strategy with them, and together, they killed their captors. He then agreed with the women to go back to Athens and win their freedom if he were allowed to marry one of them. He thus succeeded in both the mission and the marriage, and his marriage was so happy that Athenians instituted festivals in his honour, and he came to be associated with marriage.

According to Apollodorus, "the Orphics report" that Hymenaeus was among those resurrected by Asclepius.

== In popular culture ==
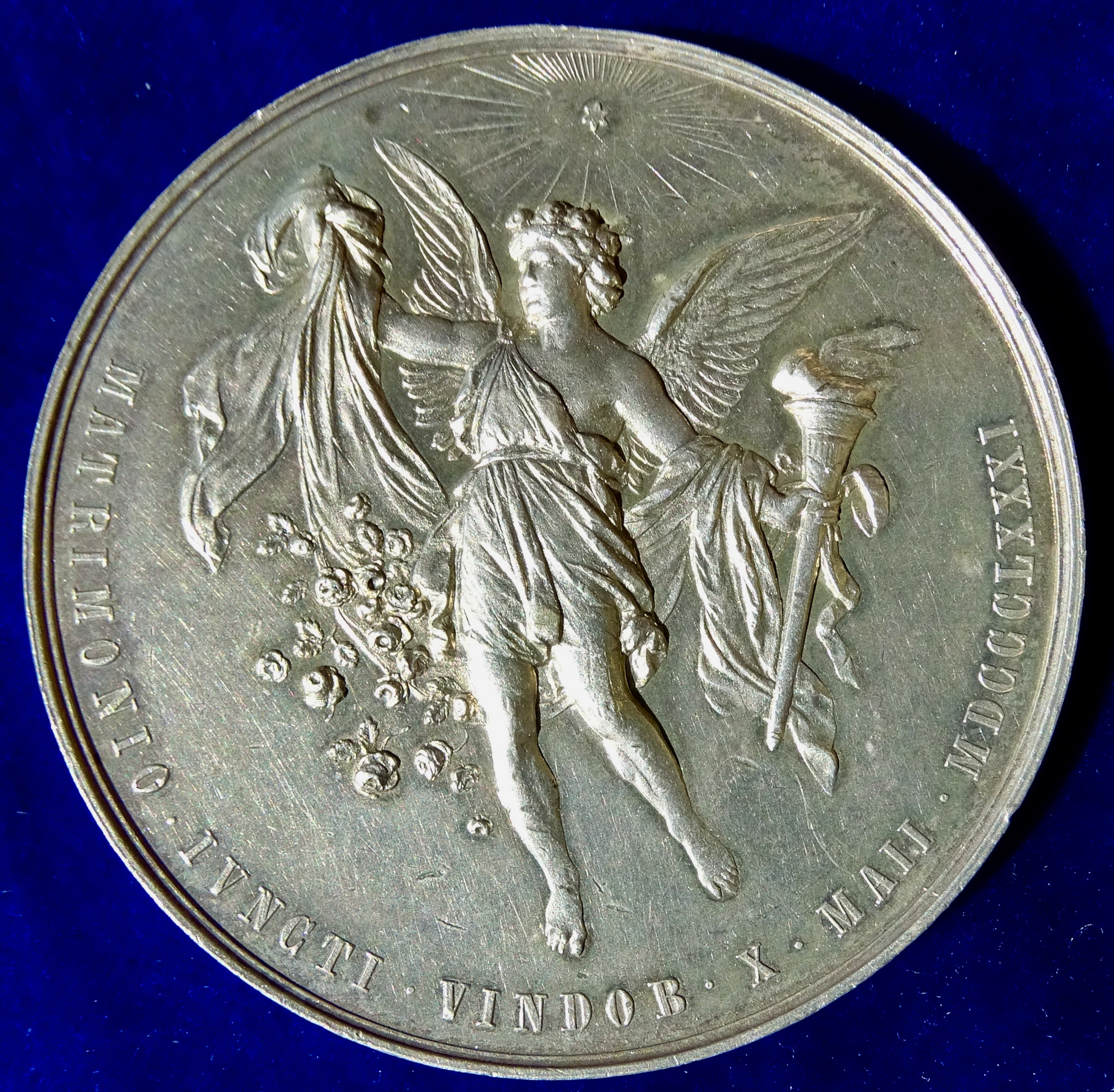
Hymen on the reverse of the 1881 wedding medal of Crown Prince Rudolf of Habsburg & Stephanie of Belgium by Tautenhayn

At least since the Italian Renaissance, Hymen was generally represented in art as a young man wearing a garland of flowers and holding a burning torch in one hand.

Hymen is mentioned in seven plays by William Shakespeare: Hamlet, The Tempest, Much Ado about Nothing, Titus Andronicus, Pericles, Prince of Tyre, Timon of Athens, and As You Like It – in which he presides over the rites for four weddings. These include a dance of harmony for the eight characters entering their unions, including the play's protagonist and heroine Rosalind with her beloved Orlando.

In 1817, John Wolcot coined the term Hymen's war terrific to describe the race among the children of King George III to marry and produce sons, done in order to avoid a succession crisis in the British monarchy.

Hymen (1921) is an early book of poetry by the American modernist poet H.D. The eponymous long poem of the collection imagines an ancient Greek women's ritual for a bride.

== Sister project ==
Media related to Hymen (god) at Wikimedia Commons
