= Argynnus =

Greek mythological boy from Boeotia

In Greek mythology, Argynnus (Ancient Greek: Ἄργυννος, romanized: Árgunnos) is a young and handsome boy from Boeotia. He is said to have been a lover of the Greek king Agamemnon, and to have later died in the Cephissus river. Agamemnon subsequently establishes the worship of Aphrodite under the epithet "Argynnus".

His story is told by the Greek elegiac poet Phanocles, as well as by Athenaeus and the Roman poet Propertius.

== Family ==
According to the Byzantine author Stephanus of Byzantium, he is the son of Pisidice, while Likymnios of Chios considered him the lover of the god Hymenaeus.

== Mythology ==
According to the elegiac poet Phanocles, while Agamemnon is in the town of Aulis, he becomes enamoured of Argynnus. His love for the boy causes him to forget his troops. The boy later dies from drowning in the Cephissus river, leading Agamemnon to start a cult to Aphrodite Argynnus.

The Greek grammarian and rhetorician Athenaeus (2nd to 3rd century AD) tells a similar tale, of how Agamemnon mourned the loss of Argynnus, his friend or lover, when he drowned in the Cephisus river. He buried him, honored with a tomb and a shrine to Aphrodite Argynnus.

Plutarch narrates a version in which Argynnus does not reciprocate Agamemnon's love, fleeing whilst he pursues.

The Roman elegiac poet Propertius tells of "Agamemnon's woe" at the loss of the young man, who he calls a descendant of Athamas. He also states that Agamemnon does not set sail, ultimately leading to the sacrifice of his daughter, Iphigenia.

This episode is also found in Clement of Alexandria.

According to the Byzantine grammarian Stephanus of Byzantium (fl. 6th century AD), Argynnus is a prince from Boeotia, one of the sons of the queen Pisidice, placing him as a descendant of Athamas, and ultimately of Aeolus. He briefly recounts the story of his death.

According to Athenaeus, Likymnios of Chios, in his Dithyrambics, says that Argynnus was a lover of the god Hymenaeus.
