= Argennis =

Epithet of Aphrodite

Argennis (Ancient Greek: Ἀργεννίς) was an epithet of the Greek goddess Aphrodite, which was derived from Argennus (sometimes Anglicized as "Argynnos"), a son of Peisidice.

Argennus was lusted after by the ancient king Agamemnon, and pursued by him. In order to escape, Argennus hurled himself to his death in the river Cephissus, after which Agamemnon built a sanctuary of Aphrodite Argennis to honor him.
