= Aristodama of Smyrna =

Aristodama of Smyrna (Ancient Greek: Ἀριστοδάμα) was a 3rd-century BCE itinerant poet of ancient Ionia. She was most likely born in Smyrna, on the west coast of Asia minor or modern-day Izmir, Turkey. None of her works have survived to the present; we know of her only through inscriptions found in the mainland Greek cities of Lamia and Chaleion. Through the inscriptions we know only a little about her. She was the daughter of Amytas. It is also mentioned that she had a brother, Dionysius. It is very likely that her brother was her chaperone. Though her age when receiving her awards is unclear there is a possibility that she was a child as no husband is mentioned in either inscription, as well as the appearance of her brother as a chaperone. However, neither inscription called her a pais (a child or servant person below the age of puberty). The inscription talks about the two decrees that she was awarded when she visited these places.

The first decree was from Lamia. It states that Aristodama is to receive proxenos, possession of land, and inviolability (safety both on land and at sea, and during war and peace). Aristodama must have lived sometime after 217 BCE. This can be deduced because the contemporary Agetas of Callipolis is mentioned in the Lamia inscription as an Aetolian general. The decree also said she shall be granted safety for her and any children she may have in the future for the rest of time. She is also given a house and land that will also be granted safety. For her brother he is to be given proxenia, citizenship, and also inviolability. The second decree is along the same lines however this one was a delphic copy issued from the Lokrian polis of Chaleion. Chaleion honored her for several readings of an epic (that they may have commissioned from her) narrating the traditions of their Aetolian ancestors. Where she was praised for being pious and virtuous, and for her good-will to the country she will be crowned with a garland of sacred laurel. This decree adds a few different and interesting things. For example, this decree states that she will be given immunity and 100 drachmas, possibly equivalent to 1/3 of a person's yearly income at the time, this was given as a guest gift. In this decree they also add that her brother should be given immunity. This perhaps is the earliest known such honor granted to a woman, it provides evidence of the opportunities of education and advancement for women in the Hellenistic period. This might be the first ever recorded instance where a woman has received these honors, and on her own merit.

== See also ==
- Newman, J. K. (1988). Ennius’ Annales: Innovation and Continuity [Review of The Annals of Quintus Ennius, by O. Skutsch]. The American Journal of Philology, 109(3), 435. https://doi.org/10.2307/294896
- Mack, William. “Consulting the Oracle at Dodona about a Female Proxenos? Lhôte No. 15 Reconsidered (SEG 56 663).” Zeitschrift Für Papyrologie Und Epigraphik 188 (2014): 155–156. http://www.jstor.org/stable/23850804
- SCHOLTEN, JOSEPH. “The Importance of Being Aitolian.” In Belonging and Isolation in the Hellenistic World, edited by SHEILA L. AGER and RIEMER A. FABER, 102. University of Toronto Press, 2013. http://www.jstor.org/stable/10.3138/9781442699441.12
- CAMERON, ALAN. “The Ivory Tower.” In Callimachus and His Critics, 47. Princeton University Press, 1995. http://www.jstor.org/stable/j.ctt1m3nzh4.7
- Goff, Barbara. “In and Out of the City: Imaginary Citizens.” In Citizen Bacchae: Women's Ritual Practice in Ancient Greece, 1st ed., Footnote 3. University of California Press, 2004. http://www.jstor.org/stable/10.1525/j.ctt1pns7d.9
