= Anne K. Mellor =

American academic

- Born: Anne Kostelanetz Mellor; July 15, 1941 (age 85)
- Spouse: Ronald J. Mellor
- Children: 1

Academic background
- Education: Brown University (BA); Columbia University (MA, PhD)

Academic work
- Discipline: English Literature; Women's Studies
- Institutions: University of California, Los Angeles

Anne Kostelanetz Mellor (born July 15, 1941) is an American academic working as a Distinguished Professor of English Literature and Women's Studies at the University of California, Los Angeles. She specializes in Romantic literature, British cultural history, feminist theory, philosophy, art history and gender studies. She is most known for a series of essays and books that introduced forgotten female Romantic writers into literary history, and she edited the first volume of feminist essays on Romantic writers in 1988, entitled Romanticism and Feminism.

== Education ==
Mellor received her Bachelor of Arts, summa cum laude, from Brown University in 1963. She earned a Master of Arts in English in 1964 and a PhD in comparative literature in 1968, both from Columbia University.

== Scholarship ==
Her most important books on women and Romanticism include Mothers of the Nation: Women's Political Writing in England, 1780-1830 (2000), Mary Shelley: Her Life, Her Fiction, Her Monsters (1988), Romanticism and Gender (1993). She also co-edited British Literature 1780-1830, a literary anthology that contributed to the prominence of women writers in Romanticism course syllabi and literary criticism.

== Awards ==
In 1999, Mellor received the Keats-Shelley Association Distinguished Scholar Award. She has received, among many others, two Guggenheim Fellowships and several National Endowment for the Humanities grants.
