= Melinno =

Ancient Greek poetess

Melinno (Ancient Greek: Μελιννῶ, romanized: Melinnô) was a Greek lyric poet. She is known from a single surviving poem, known as the "Ode to Rome". The poem survives in a quotation by the fifth century AD author Stobaeus, who included it in a compilation of poems on manliness. It was apparently included in this collection by mistake, as Stobaeus misinterpreted the word ρώμα (rhṓma) in the first line as meaning "strength", rather than being the Greek name for the city of Rome.

== Overview ==
Nothing is known of Melinno or her life. Scholars have suggested dates ranging from the third century BC to the second century AD. C. M. Bowra argued based on the content of the poem attributed to her that the first half of the second century BC was likely; and most scholars agree with a date in the republican period. The fact that she wrote a poem about the power of Rome without any mention of the emperor suggests that she was writing before the beginning of the principate. Literary parallels have been suggested between Melinno's poetry and poems in honour of Tiberius Quinctius Flaminius from 191 BC. However, some scholars, such as Hugh Lloyd-Jones, argue for a date in the second century AD. Lloyd-Jones sees the poem as characteristic of the Greek revivalism of the period, and draws comparisons to the poetry of Mesomedes and Julia Balbilla.

According to Stobaeus, Melinno was from the island of Lesbos. This may have been based on her use of the Sapphic stanza in her poetry. However, she does not use a Lesbian dialect in her poetry, and aside from Stobaeus' testimony there is nothing to link her to the island.

Melinno's "Ode to Rome" is a hymn to the goddess Roma, made up of five Sapphic stanzas. It is written in an artificial choral dialect, and Melinno's use of this dialect and the Sapphic stanza, which was rarely used after Sappho's day, suggest that she was well-educated. Each of Melinno's stanzas is a self-contained unit, unlike the practice of the archaic Lesbian poets. C. M. Bowra describes the effect as being "stiff and stilted", but suggests that these sharp divisions between the stanzas were to allow the poem to be performed as part of a ritual, with each stanza performed separately. Josephine Balmer notes that despite the stiffness of the poem, which "even Melinno's apologists" acknowledge, it is filled with mythological and literary allusions.

The poem resembles the traditional form of a hymn, with the first stanza as an invocation to the goddess, and the remaining stanzas praising her. It does not end with the prayer which would traditionally make up the third part of a hymn; it is uncertain whether the poem originally contained such a prayer which is lost.

== Works cited ==
- Balmer, Josephine (1996). Classical Women Poets. Bloodaxe Books. ISBN 1-85224-342-2.
- Bowra, C. M. (1957). "Melinno's Hymn to Rome". Journal of Roman Studies. 47 (1). doi:10.2307/298561. JSTOR 298561.
- Natoli, Bartolo A.; Pitts, Angela; Hallett, Judith P. (2022). Ancient Women Writers of Greece and Rome. Routledge.
- Plant, I. M. (2004). Women Writers of Ancient Greece and Rome: an Anthology. Norman: University of Oklahoma Press.
- Pomeroy, Sarah B. (1977). "Technikai kai Mousikai: The Education of Women in the Fourth Century and the Hellenistic World". American Journal of Ancient History. 2 (1).
- Rayor, Diane (1991). Sappho's Lyre: Archaic Lyric and Women Poets of Ancient Greece. Berkeley: University of California Press. ISBN 978-0-520-07336-4.
- Robbins, Emmet (2006). "Melinno". Brill's New Pauly.
