= Cleitagora =

Ancient Greek poet

Cleitagora or Clitagora or Kleitagora (Greek: Κλειταγόρα) was a lyric poet mentioned by Aristophanes in his Wasps and his lost play the Danaïdes; a fragment of Cratinus also mentions her. A drinking song named "Cleitagora" is mentioned in Aristophanes' Lysistrata.

According to a scholiast on Lysistrata and the Suda she was a Spartan. However, the scholiast on the Wasps says that Cleitagora was Thessalian, and Hesychius says that she was from Lesbos. Sarah Pomeroy argues that a Spartan origin is more likely. As Spartan women, unlike other Greek women, drank wine in their daily life rather than only at religious festivals, it makes sense to name a drinking song after a Spartan woman. If Cleitagora was Spartan, this would explain why the song "Cleitagora" was said to be more appropriate to sing than "Telamon" when the Spartan women are visiting in Lysistrata.

Nothing further is known of either Cleitagora or the song named after her.

== See also ==
- Megalostrata

== Works cited ==
- Aristophanes (1971). MacDowell, Douglas (ed.). Wasps. Oxford: Clarendon Press.
- Pomeroy, Sarah B. (2002). Spartan Women. Oxford: Oxford University Press. ISBN 0-19-513066-9.
- Smith, Philip (1870). "Cleitagora". In Smith, William (ed.). Dictionary of Greek and Roman Biography and Mythology. Vol. 1. p. 784.
