= Agetas =

3rd-century BC Greek general

- Occupation: Commander-in-chief

Agetas (Ancient Greek: Ἀγήτας) of Callipolis was commander-in-chief (or strategos) of the Aetolians in 217 BC, during which year he made an incursion into Acarnania and Epirus and ravaged both countries. For this accomplishment, he received the honor of a statue in the city of Lamia. Agetas also fought in the Macedonian Wars, and served as strategos again, succeeding Dorymachus around the start of the 2nd century. In 200, he was the strategos who met with a Roman diplomatic trio consisting of Gaius Claudius Nero, Publius Sempronius Tuditanus, and Marcus Aemilius Lepidus.
