= Ronald J. Mellor =

American historian (born 1940)

- Born: September 30, 1940 (age 85)
- Education: Regis High School; Princeton University (PhD)
- Occupation: Historian
- Spouse: Anne K. Mellor
- Children: 1

Ronald J. Mellor (born September 30, 1940) is a distinguished professor of history at the University of California, Los Angeles. His area of research has been ancient religion and Roman historiography, where he has published a number of books.

Mellor attended Regis High School in New York City. He received his Ph.D. in Classics from Princeton University in 1968. His previous teaching posts include Stanford University. He has been a Visiting Fellow/Scholar at University College, London, the Humanities Research Centre of the Australian National University, the American Academy in Rome, and the Institute for Advanced Study in Princeton, New Jersey.

== Bibliography ==
- Ronald Mellor, "θΕΑ ΡΩΜΗ: The Worship of the Goddess Roma in the Greek World" ISBN 3525251386 Vandenhoeck & Ruprecht 1975
- Ronald Mellor, "From Augustus to Nero: The First Dynasty of Imperial Rome" ISBN 0870132636 Michigan State Univ. Press 1989
- Ronald Mellor, "Tacitus" ISBN 0-415-90665-2 Routledge 1992
- Ronald Mellor, "Tacitus: The Classical Tradition" ISBN 0815309333 Garland Books/Routledge 1995
- Ronald Mellor, "The Roman Historians" ISBN 0415117747 Routledge 1999
- Ronald Mellor, "Text and Tradition: Studies in Greek History and Historiography in Honor of Mortimer Chambers" (with L. Tritle) 1999 Regina Books
- Ronald Mellor, "The Ancient Roman World" (with Marni McGee)ISBN 0195153804 Oxford University Press 2004
- Ronald Mellor, "The World in Ancient Times: Primary Sources and Reference Volumes" (with Amanda Podany) ISBN 0195222202 Oxford University Press 2005
- Ronald Mellor, "Augustus and the Creation of the Roman Empire" ISBN 0312404697 St Martin's Press 2005
- Ronald Mellor, "Tacitus' Annals" ISBN 0195151933 Oxford University Press 2010
- Ronald Mellor, "The Historians of Ancient World" Routledge 1997 (1st ed.); 2004 (expanded 2nd ed.); 2012 (expanded 3rd ed.) ISBN 9780415527163
