= Naumachius =

Ancient Greek poet

Naumachius (Ancient Greek: Ναυμάχιος) was a Greek didactic poet.

Of his poems, seventy-three hexameters (in three fragments) are preserved by Stobaeus in his Florilegium (4.22b.32, 4.23.7, 4.32c.76). Although the poem begins with the notion that the ideal life of an intelligent woman is one in which she remains unmarried, living in the company of like-minded women, it turns to advice on how a woman should conduct herself in the second-best life, that of a wife, outlining how she should coexist with her husband, raise their children, and manage the household. From the remarks on celibacy and the allusion to a mystic marriage it has been conjectured that the author was a Christian.

The Greek fragments have been very loosely translated (anonymously) into English under the title of Advice to the Fair Sex (London 1736). The Greek text is in Gaisford's Poetae minores Graeci, i (Oxford 1823) 461–5, and (all three fragments together as one continuous passage) in Ernst Heitsch, Die griechischen Dichterfragmente der Römischen Kaiserzeit (Göttingen 1961) 92–4.
