= Oroebantius =

Ancient Greek poet

Oroebantius (Ancient Greek: Ὀροιβάντιος) of Troezena, an ancient epic poet, whose poems were said by the Troezenians to be more ancient than those of Homer.
