= Phanocles =

Ancient Greek poet

Phanocles (Ancient Greek: Φανοκλῆς) was a Greek elegiac poet who probably flourished about the time of Alexander the Great.

His extant fragments show resemblances in style and language to Philitas of Cos, Callimachus and Hermesianax. He was the author of a poem on pederasty, entitled Loves or Beautiful Boys (Ancient Greek: Ἔρωτες ἢ Καλοί). A lengthy fragment in Stobaeus (Florilegium, 4.20b.47) describes the love of Orpheus for the youthful Calaïs, son of Boreas, and his subsequent death at the hands of the Thracian women. Erotes e Kaloi describes among others the love between Dionysus and Adonis, Cycnus and Phaethon, Tantalus and Ganymedes, and of Agamemnon and Argynnus.
