= Agathyllus =

Ancient Greek poet

Agathyllus (Ancient Greek: Ἀγάθυλλος) was a Greek elegiac poet from Arcadia, who is quoted by Dionysius of Halicarnassus in reference to the history of Aeneas and the foundation of Rome.

He came into Arcadia, and, in Nesus, married his two daughters Codone and Anthemone. But he himself hastened to the Hesperian land, where he begot Romulus.

Some of his other verses are preserved by Dionysius, although he largely says the accounts of Agathyllus agree with those of another ancient writer, Cephalon.
