= Megalostrata (poet) =

Spartan poet

Megalostrata (Ancient Greek: Μεγαλοστράτα) was a female Spartan poet known only from a fragment of the lyric poet Alcman, which is cited in Athenaeus' Deipnosophistae. Alcman describes her as a "golden-haired maiden enjoying the gift of the Muses". None of her works survive. According to Athenaeus, Megalostrata was the lover of Alcman, who loved her because of her conversational skills. However, the love between Megalostrata and Alcman was probably an invention of Archytas or Chamaeleon, Athenaeus' sources for his anecdote about Megalostrata.

== See also ==
- Cleitagora
