= Isyllus =

Ancient Greek poet

Isyllus (Ancient Greek: Ἴσυλλος) was an ancient Greek poet from Epidaurus, of the 4th or 3rd century BC.

== Work ==
His name was rediscovered in the course of excavations on the site of the temple of Asclepius at Epidaurus. An inscription was found engraved on stone, consisting of 72 lines of verse (trochaic tetrameters, hexameters, ionics), mainly in the Doric Greek dialect. It is preceded by two lines of prose stating that the author was Isvllus, an Epidaurian, and that it was dedicated to Asclepius and Apollo of Malea. It contains a few political remarks, showing general sympathy with an aristocratic form of government; a self-congratulatory notice of the resolution, passed at the poet's instigation, to arrange a solemn procession in honor of the two gods; a paean (no doubt for use in the procession), chiefly occupied with the genealogical relations of Apollo and Asclepius; a poem of thanks for the assistance rendered to Sparta by Asclepius against "Philip", when he led an army against Sparta to put down the monarchy. The offer of assistance was made by the god himself to the youthful poet, who had entered the Asclepieum to pray for recovery from illness, and communicated the good news to the Spartans. The Philip referred to is identified with (a) Philip II of Macedon, who invaded Peloponnesus after the battle of Chaeronea in 338 BC, or (b) with Philip V, who undertook a similar campaign in 218 BC.

== Editions ==
Wilamowitz-Moellendorff, who characterizes Isyllus as a "poetaster without talent and a farcical politician," has written an elaborate treatise on him (see Kiessling and Moellendorff, Philologische Untersuchungen, Heft 9, 1886), containing the text with notes, and essays on the political condition of Peloponnesus and the cult of Asclepius. The inscription was first edited by P. Kavvadias (1885), and by J. F. Baunack in Studien auf dem Gebiete der griechischen und der arischen Sprachen (1886).
