= Aeschylus of Alexandria =

Ancient Greek poet

Aeschylus of Alexandria (Greek Αισχύλος ὁ Ἀλεξανδρεύς) was an epic poet who must have lived before the end of the 2nd century, and whom Athenaeus calls a well-informed man. One of his poems bore the title Amphitryon, and another Messeniaca. A fragment of the former is preserved in Athenaeus. According to Zenobius, he had also written a work on proverbs.
