= Aeschylus of Rhodes =

4th-century BC Rhodian

Aeschylus
- Occupation: Inspector of Governors

Aeschylus (Ancient Greek: Αισχύλος) of Rhodes was appointed by Alexander the Great one of the inspectors of the governors of that country after its conquest in 332 BC. He is not spoken of again until 319, when he is mentioned as conveying in four ships six hundred talents of silver from Cilicia to Macedonia, which were detained at Ephesus by Antigonus, in order to pay his foreign mercenaries.
