= Gorgo (poet) =

Gorgo was an ancient Greek poetess who, according to the 2nd-century CE Maximus of Tyre, was a rival of Sappho. Maximus provides further descriptions of Sappho's supposed attacks on these authors, writing that "sometimes she [Sappho] censures them," or "cross-examines" them or even utilizes irony in her attacks on these writers. More specifically, regarding the irony, he compares Socrates's mockery of Ion wherein, before tearing apart the arguments of his opponent, Socrates begins by saying "Good day to you Ion." Likewise, Sappho supposedly begins her invective by proclaiming "I wish the daughter of the house of Polyanax a very good day." It is not entirely clear exactly who this "daughter of the house of Polyanax" is; it may refer to either Gorgo or Andromeda, another rival of Sappho. According to the classicist Stefano Caciagli, it is more likely that the text refers specifically to Gorgo, as Maximus already discusses fragments from Sappho that were insults against Andromeda, and—according to Caciagli—it is unlikely that Maximus would have cited two passages concerning Andromeda and none about Gorgo, for he otherwise never quotes two passages concerning the same rival of Socrates.

Gorgo is also mentioned directly in a surviving fragment of Sapphic poetry as a "yokemate" ("σύνδυγος," "súndugos") of another individual named Archeanassa, who—according to the ancient commentary accompanying the passage—actually the held the name Pleistodica, with the name Archeanassa presumably deriving from her family name. The usage of the term súndugos perhaps implies that Gorgo and Pleistodica they were lovers or at the very least close friends. Alternatively, according to the classicist Holt Parker, the term súndugos is probably best interpreted as an insult in this context, in part on account of Sappho's aforementioned personal conflict with Gorgo. Parker further suggests that the entire purpose of this passage was to insult the female line of the family Pittacus, a member of the Archaeanactid dynasty. Gorgo is also mentioned in a third fragment from Sappho, of which only a small sentence survives noting the existence of men who, depending upon the translation of the participle κεκορημένοις ("kekorēménois"), are either "fed up with Gorgo" or perhaps "satiated with her." If the latter translation is accepted, then the text may reference supposed sexual promiscuity.
