= Syagrus (poet) =

Ancient Greek poet

Syagrus (Ancient Greek: Σύαγρος) is a legendary ancient Greek oral poet. He is said in a traditional list to have been a rival of Homer; elsewhere it is said that he followed Orpheus and Musaeus in chronological sequence and was the first maker of an epic on the Trojan War. This would have been a forerunner of the later poems in the Epic Cycle.

== Sources ==
- Diogenes Laërtius, Lives of the Philosophers 2.46.
- Aelian, Varia Historia 14.21.
- Eustathius of Thessalonica, Commentary on the Iliad 1.6.
