= Likymnios of Chios =

Poet of ancient Greece

Likymnios of Chios (Greek: Λικύμνιος, Latin: Licymnius) was an ancient Greek dithyrambic poet from Chios, probably born in the fourth century BCE although this is not certain.

Aristotle mentions him in his "Rhetoric", saying that Likymnios' works were as good in written form as spoken or better. He is also mentioned by Chaeremon of Alexandria. Partii says that he wrote a poem about the conquest of Sardis and Eustathius of Epiphania mentions him in a poem as Λικύμνιον Βουπραδιέα ἀοιδόν. In his Erotica Pathemata, Parthenius of Nicaea credits the story of Nanis to Likymnios and Hermesianax.

Of his dithyrambs none are wholly extant; they are survived only by fragments recorded in the works of others. One such fragment, concerning Hypnos and Endymion, his lover, is preserved in Athenaeus of Naucratis' Deipnosophistae. Another of his fragments, a prayer for health rendered in poetic verse, was preserved by Sextus Empiricus in Against Ethicists, although the attribution is uncertain; of the six preserved lines, three lines are identical to lines in the a known paean, also to health, by Ariphron of Sicyon.
