= Richard Foerster (classical scholar) =

German classical scholar

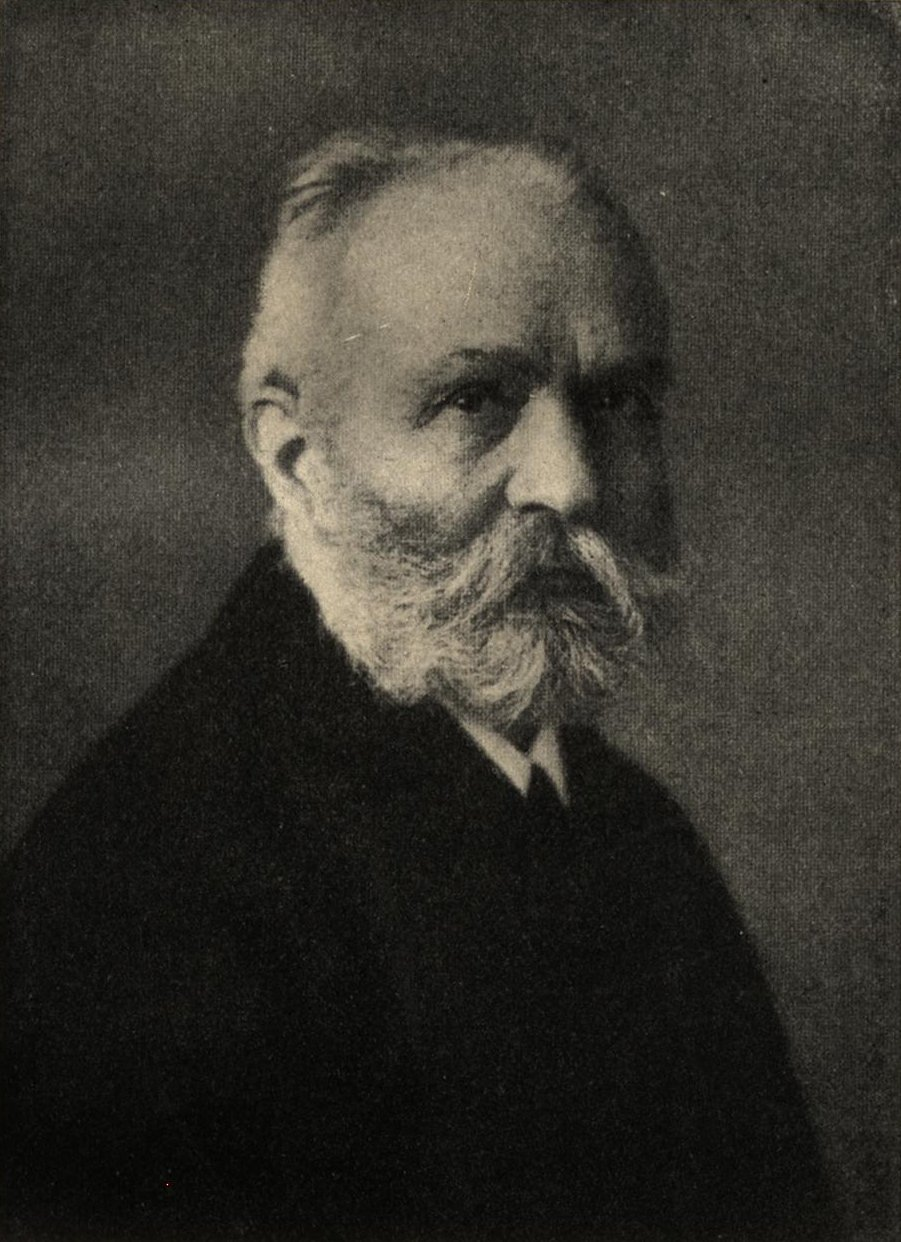
- Born: March 2, 1843; Görlitz, Prussia (now Germany)
- Died: August 7, 1922 (aged 79); Breslau, Germany (now Poland)
- Citizenship: German Empire
- Education: University of Jena, University of Breslau
- Known for: critical editions of Libanius, Choricius of Gaza, Physiognomonics
- Scientific career
- Fields: Classics
- Workplaces: University of Rostock, University of Kiel, University of Breslau

Signature
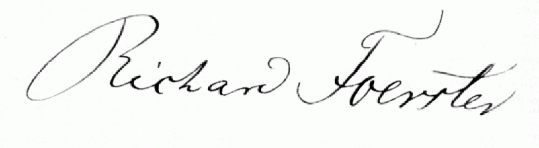

Richard Foerster (March 2, 1843 – August 7, 1922) was a German classical scholar.

He is best known for his extensive research on Greek rhetoric of Late antiquity and for his critical edition of Libanius' works.

== Biography ==
Though born and raised in Görlitz, Foerster never saw himself a Lusatian and felt the strongest allegiance to Silesia, where he studied since winter term 1861 after a semester at Jena. In Breslau he dropped theology and concentrated on classics in a comprehensive way. Apart from Greek and Roman literature (under Jacob Bernays and Martin Hertz) he studied metrics under Rudolf Westphal, archaeology under August Rossbach, Sanskrit under Adolf Friedrich Stenzler. His doctoral thesis was inspired by Friedrich Haase and dealt with a phaenomenon in Greek grammar called attractio casus.

From 1866 on Foerster worked as a substitute teacher at the Maria-Magdalenen-Gymnasium in Breslau. After being promoted to Dr. phil. in 1866 and earning the venia legendi via habilitation in 1868, Foerster was granted the Travel Stipend of the German Archaeological Institute. The next two years he spent in Italy, mostly Rome, where he met many foreign scholars, collated manuscripts and laid the foundation for what was to become his life's work: critical editions of the physiognomists and of the works of Libanius.

Back at Breslau, Foerster juggled four different tasks: Teaching elementary Latin und Greek at the gymnasium, holding lectures and seminars at the university, proceeding with his scientific studies and propagating ancient culture in the Schlesische Gesellschaft für vaterländische Kultur ("Silesian Society for Patriotic Culture"). He eventually resigned from his school position when he was offered an extraordinary chair at the university in 1873.

In 1875, Foerster accepted a chair at the University of Rostock where he worked as third Professor of Classical Philology besides Ludwig Bachmann and Franz Volkmar Fritzsche. Despite being constantly challenged by Fritzsche's difficult personality, Foerster soon came to enjoy his work as professor in Rostock. He was glad about his students which came to admire him in return. His scientific studies were prolongated by the small and outdated library. After acting as Dean of the Faculty of Philosophy in 1879/1880 Foerster went on a research travel to England, Spain, and France (funded by the Prussian Academy of Sciences), where he collated manuscripts and started his third opus magnum, the collection of the orations of Choricius of Gaza which were partly unedited at the time.

Soon after his return to Rostock, Foerster was called to a chair at Kiel. In Kiel he had a bigger library at his disposal and more students to teach than in Rostock. Relations to his colleagues Peter Wilhelm Forchhammer and Friedrich Blass were complicated and further strained over the years. In a collegial way he only collaborated with the professores extraordinarii Friedrich Leo and Ivo Bruns. Among the other professors Foerster was revered. In 1885 he was elected Dean of the Faculty of Philosophy, in 1886 he was elected Rector of the University. In his ceremonial speech he talked about Die klassische Philologie der Gegenwart ("Classical Philology in the Present"), giving his views of the field and of the ideal scientist.

In December 1889, Foerster was offered a chair at his alma mater in Breslau. He accepted with great pleasure and went to Breslau in April 1890. For a few years, he worked alongside his old teachers Hertz and Rossbach. After the latter's death, Foerster was put in charge of the Archaeological Museum and made Professor of Philology and Archaeology. He continued teaching and research until his death in 1922, aged 79.

== Works ==
Richard Foerster's academic career spanned from the 1860s to the Interwar period. Educated a philologist and humanist, Foerster early turned to archaeology and later to art history; but he never quit pursuing his philological tasks which were his life's work.

=== Physiognomy ===
Philological and archaeological interests met in Foerster's early enterprise to collate and edit the ancient writings on physiognomy, the art of relating a person's appearance to his character and personality. From Aristotle (Physiognomonics) on, ancient philosophers and sophists had dealt with this matter in different ways. Part of their writing was only extant in Latin or Arabic translation, which Foerster also collated and re-translated. After nearly 25 years, Foerster eventually finished his edition Scriptores physiognomonici Graeci et Latini. It was published in 1893 in two volumes and dedicated to August Rossbach, Foerster's former teacher and (now) colleague in Breslau, at his 75th birthday.

=== Libanius ===
During his time in Italy, Foerster was inspired by Rudolf Hercher to collate the manuscripts of the late antique orator and sophist Libanius of Antiochia. This was a task of major importance for several reasons: Libanius' orations, declamations and progymnasmata had an immense impact on the Byzantine writers because of their admired Attic. But the only available edition (by Johann Jacob Reiske and his wife Ernestine Christine Reiske, 1784–1797) did not meet strict philological standards as it was based only on a selection of manuscripts. Also, the approximately 1500 letters of Libanius (preserved and transmitted after his death) were an important historical source for the 4th century A.D. But the most recent edition (by Johann Christoph Wolf, 1738) was outdated, and the authenticity of a number of letters was uncertain.

Foerster made it his life's work to collate every available manuscript of Libanius' writings, present a proper text in an all-new edition, trace Libanius' sources as well as his reception by later authors, put his letters into historical context, and resolve the authenticity issue by analysing the history of transmission and reception. He succeeded in all these tasks, but not in every way definitively. Whilst his historical commentary on the letters and the textual constitution was often criticised by other scholars, Foerster's main achievement remains the most reliable edition of all the works of Libanius.

After a lot of preliminary work (which had considerable impact in the classics) Foerster published his edition of Libanii opera omnia from 1903 until his death, in 12 volumes. After his death, his pupil Eberhard Richtsteig completed the final volume (published 1927) and created the index (1923).

=== Choricius of Gaza ===
While working on Libanius, Foerster was led to the 5th century orator Choricius of Gaza. In Spain he found several manuscripts containing unedited orations by the Gazaean, which Foerster published subsequently in minor magazines and indices. He also prepared a complete edition of the orations in a major publishing house, but he failed to prepare the complete edition during his life. After Foerster's death, Reichsteig edited it for Teubner (1929).

== Major writings ==
- Quaestiones de attractione enuntiationum relativarum qualis quum in aliis tum in graeca lingua potissimumque apud graecos poetas fuerit. Berlin 1868
- Der Raub und die Rückkehr der Persephone in ihrer Bedeutung für die Mythologie, Litteratur- und Kunstgeschichte. Stuttgart 1874
- Francesco Zambeccari und die Briefe des Libanios: Ein Beitrag zur Kritik des Libanios und zur Geschichte der Philologie. Stuttgart 1878
- Farnesina-Studien. Ein Beitrag zur Frage nach dem Verhältnis der Renaissance zur Antike. Rostock 1880
- Scriptores physiognomonici Graeci et Latini. Two volumes, Leipzig 1893. Reprinted Stuttgart 1994
- Johann Jacob Reiske’s Briefe. Leipzig 1897
- Libanii Opera. Twelve volumes, Leipzig 1903–1927 (9th volume, containing the introduction to the edition of the Epistles, and 12th volume, containing the indexes, edited after Foerster's death by Eberhard Richtsteig). Reprinted Hildesheim 1963, 1985, 1998
- Das Erbe der Antike. Festreden, gehalten an der Universität Breslau. Breslau 1911
- Die Universität Breslau einst und jetzt. Vier akademische Reden. Breslau 1919
- Choricii Gazaei opera. Leipzig 1929. Reprinted Stuttgart 1972, Ann Arbor 1998
