= De rerum natura =

1st-century BC didactic poem by Lucretius

- by Lucretius
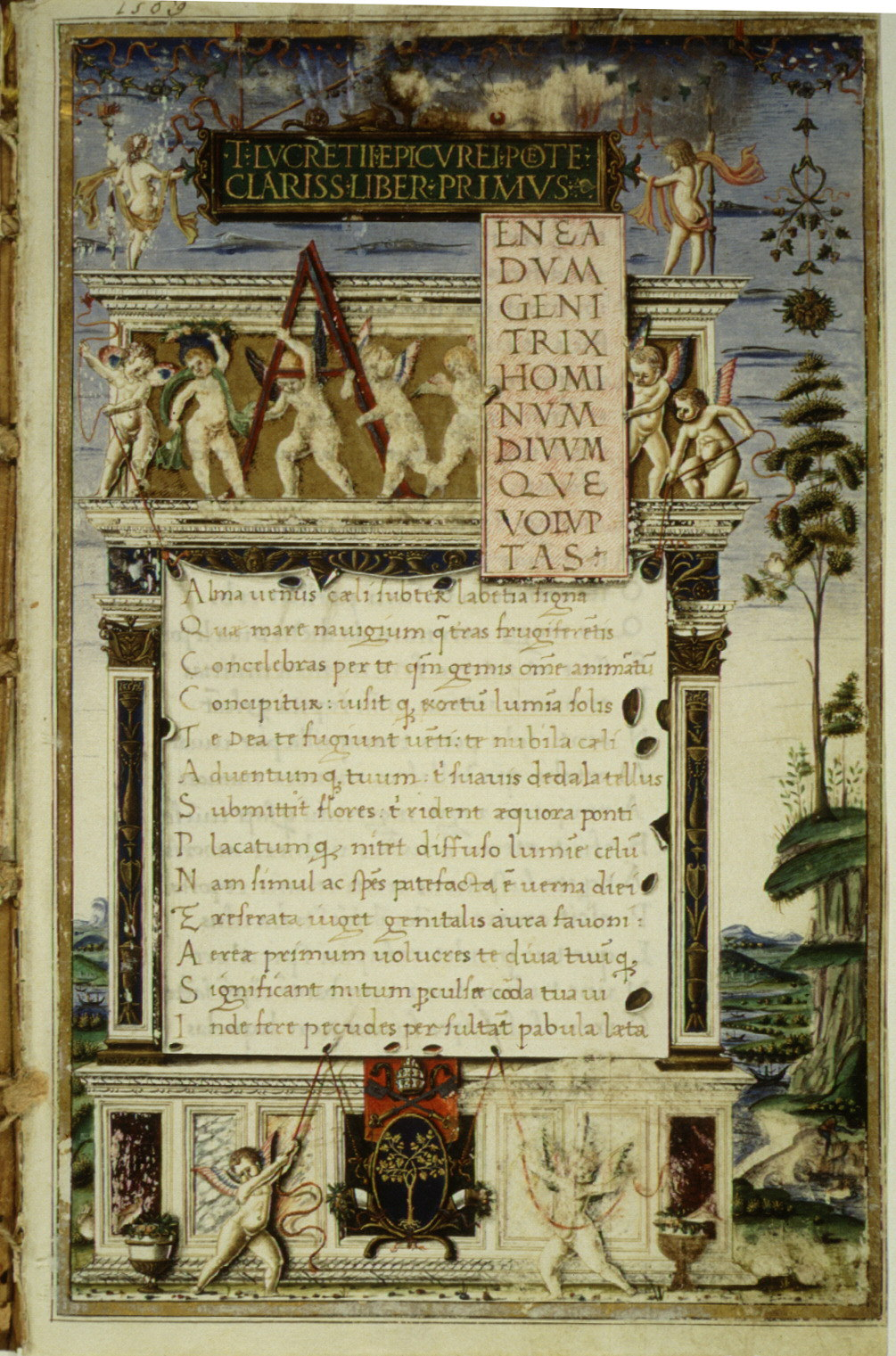
- Opening of Pope Sixtus IV's 1483 manuscript of De rerum natura, scribed by Girolamo di Matteo de Tauris
- Written: First-century BC
- Country: Roman Republic
- Language: Latin
- Subject(s): Epicureanism, ethics, physics, natural philosophy
- Genre: Didactic
- Meter: Dactylic hexameter
- Publication date: 1473
- Published in English: 1682
- Media type: manuscript
- Lines: 7,400

Full text
- On the Nature of Things at Wikisource

De rerum natura (Latin: [deː ˈreːrʊn naːˈtuːraː]; On the Nature of Things) is a first-century BCE didactic poem by the Roman poet and philosopher Lucretius (c. 99 – c. 55 BCE) with the goal of explaining Epicurean philosophy to a Roman audience. The poem, written in some 7,400 dactylic hexameters, is divided into six untitled books, and explores Epicurean physics through poetic language and metaphors. Namely, Lucretius explores the principles of atomism; the nature of the mind and soul; explanations of sensation and thought; the development of the world and its phenomena; and explains a variety of celestial and terrestrial phenomena. The universe described in the poem operates according to these physical principles, guided by fortuna ("chance"), and not the divine intervention of the traditional Roman deities.

== Background ==
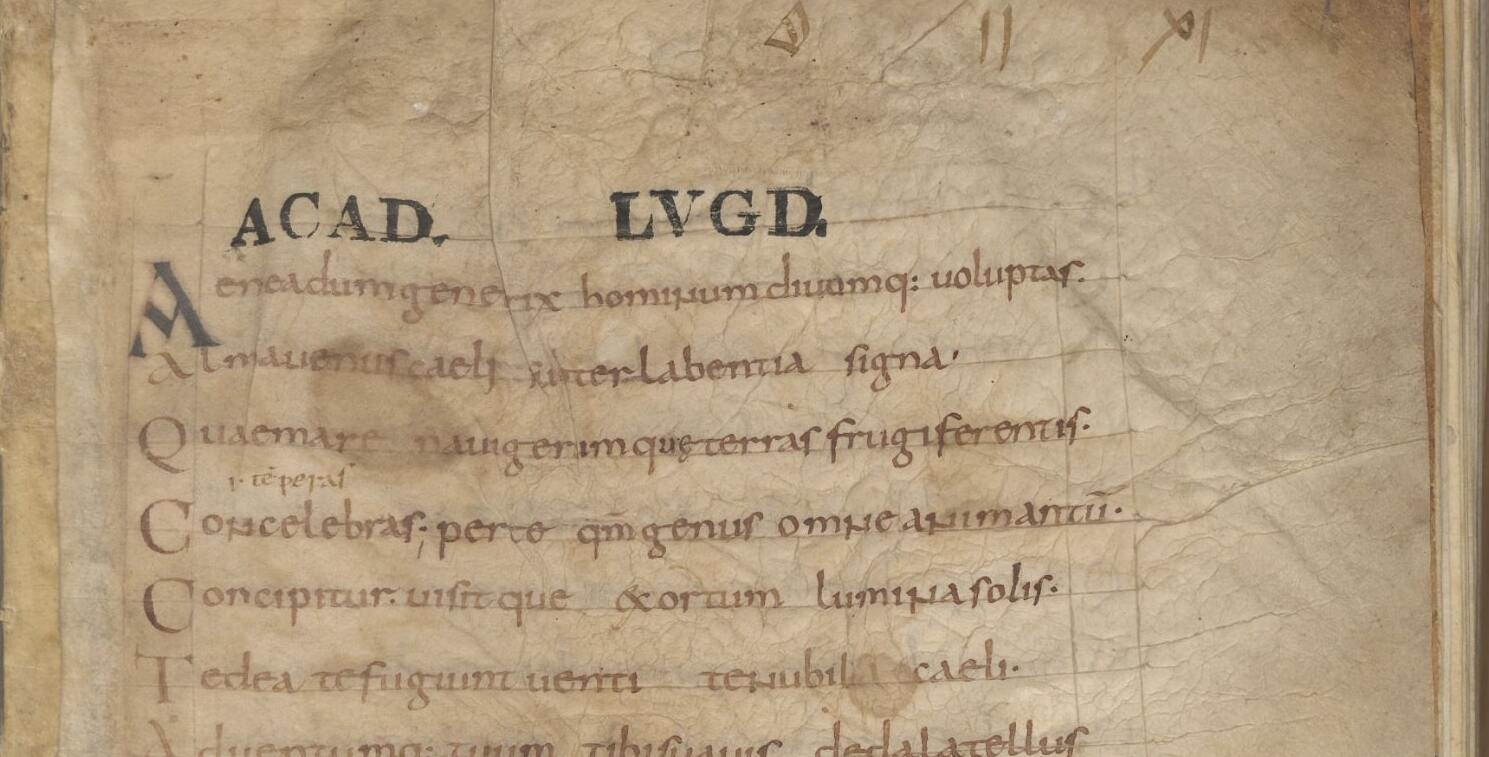
First lines: Aeneadum genetrix, hominum divomque voluptas. / alma Venus, caeli subter labentia signa / Quae mare navigerum, quae terras frugiferentis... (Translation: Mother of Aeneas' tribe, delight of men and gods, nurturing Venus, who under the gliding signs of heaven [brings] fruitfulness to the ship-carrying sea and the lands..). 9th century copy, Leiden University Library.

To the Greek philosopher Epicurus, the unhappiness and degradation of humans arose largely from the dread which they had of the power of the deities and terror of their wrath. This wrath was supposed to be displayed by the misfortunes inflicted in this life and by the everlasting tortures that were the lot of the guilty in a future state or, where these feelings were not strongly developed, from a vague dread of gloom and misery after death. Epicurus thus made it his mission to remove these fears, so as to establish tranquility in the minds of his readers. To do this, Epicurus invoked the atomism of Democritus to demonstrate that the material universe was formed not by a Supreme Being but by the mixing of elemental particles which had existed from all eternity, governed by certain simple laws. He argued that the deities (whose existence he did not deny) lived forever in the enjoyment of absolute peace—strangers to all the passions, desires and fears, which affect humans—and are totally indifferent to the world and its inhabitants, unmoved alike by their virtues and their crimes. This meant that humans had nothing to fear from them.

Lucretius's task was to clearly state and to fully develop these views in an attractive form. His work was an attempt to show through poetry that everything in nature can be explained by natural laws, without the need for the intervention of divine beings. Lucretius identifies the supernatural with the notion that the deities created our world or interfere with its operations in some way. He argues against fear of such deities by demonstrating, through observations and arguments, that the operations of the world can be accounted for in terms of natural phenomena, which are the result of regular but purposeless motions and interactions of tiny atoms in empty space.

== Contents ==
=== Synopsis ===
The poem consists of six untitled books, in dactylic hexameter. The first three books provide a fundamental account of being and nothingness, matter and space, the atoms and their movement, the infinity of the universe both as regards time and space, the regularity of reproduction (no prodigies, everything in its proper habitat), the nature of mind (animus, directing thought) and spirit (anima, sentience) as material bodily entities, and their mortality, since, according to Lucretius, they and their functions (consciousness, pain) end with the bodies that contain them and with which they are interwoven. The last three books give an atomic and materialist explanation of phenomena preoccupying human reflection, such as vision and the senses, sex and reproduction, natural forces and agriculture, the heavens, and disease.

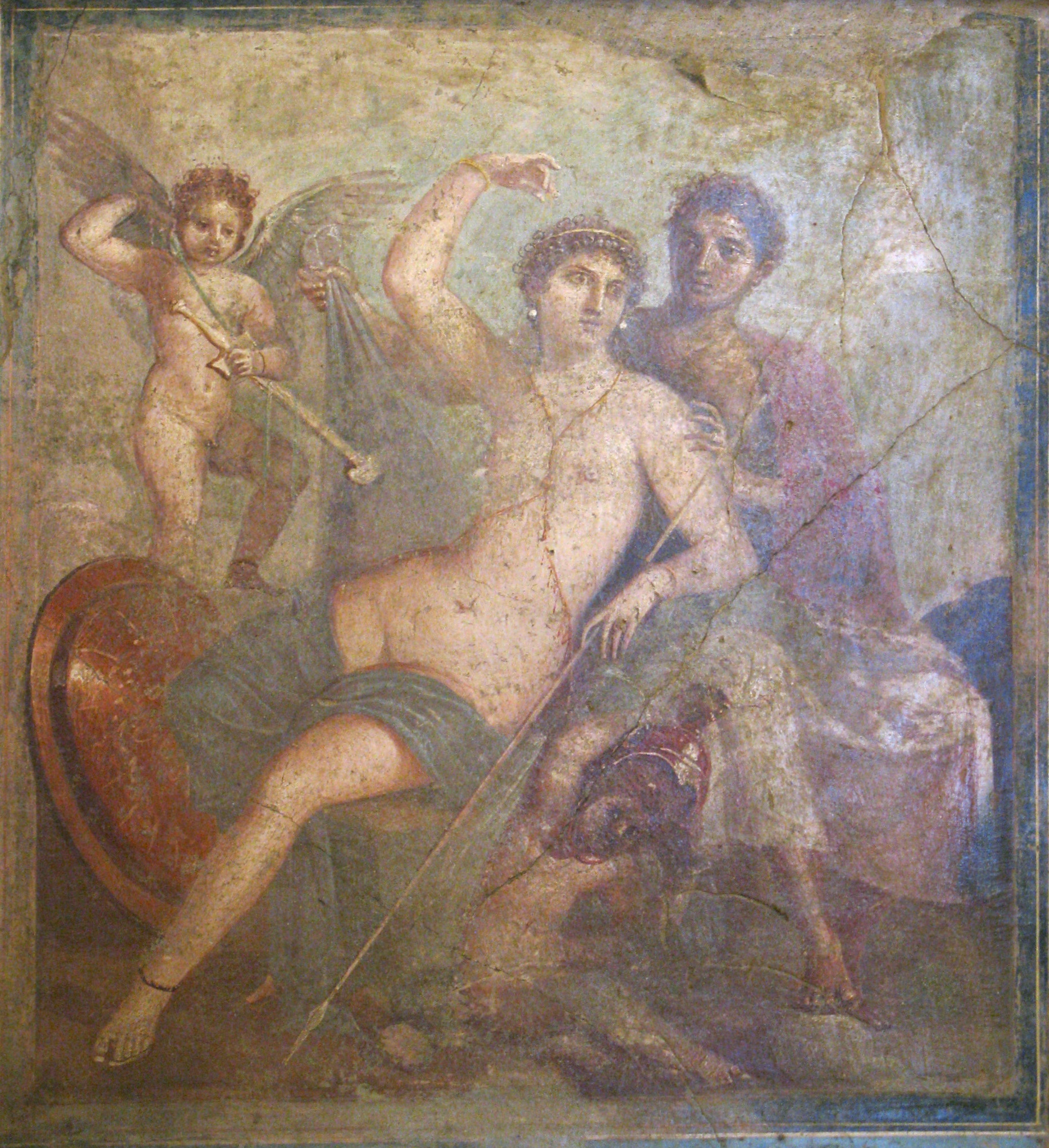
Lucretius opens his poem by addressing Venus (center), urging her to pacify her lover, Mars (right). Given Lucretius's relatively secular philosophy and his eschewing of superstition, his invocation of Venus has caused much debate among scholars.

Lucretius opens his poem by addressing Venus as the mother of Rome (Aeneadum genetrix) and the mother of nature (Alma Venus), urging her to pacify her lover Mars and spare Rome from strife. By recalling the opening to poems by Homer, Ennius, and Hesiod (all of which begin with an invocation to the Muses), the proem to De rerum natura conforms to epic convention. The entire poem is also written in the format of a hymn, recalling other early literary works, texts, and hymns and in particular the Homeric Hymn to Aphrodite. The choice to address Venus may have been due to Empedocles's belief that Aphrodite represents "the great creative force in the cosmos". Given that Lucretius goes on to argue that the gods are removed from human life, many have thus seen this opening to be contradictory: how can Lucretius pray to Venus and then deny that the gods listen to or care about human affairs? In response, many scholars argue that the poet uses Venus poetically as a metonym. For instance, Diskin Clay sees Venus as a poetic substitute for sex, and Bonnie Catto sees the invocation of the name as a metonym for the "creative process of natura".

After the opening, the poem commences with an enunciation of the proposition on the nature and being of the deities, which leads to an invective against the evils of superstition. Lucretius then dedicates time to exploring the axiom that nothing can be produced from nothing, and that nothing can be reduced to nothing (Nil fieri ex nihilo, in nihilum nil posse reverti). Following this, the poet argues that the universe comprises an infinite number of Atoms, which are scattered about in an infinite and vast void (Inane). The shape of these atoms, their properties, their movements, the laws under which they enter into combination and assume forms and qualities appreciable by the senses, with other preliminary matters on their nature and affections, together with a refutation of objections and opposing hypotheses, occupy the first two books.

In the third book, the general concepts proposed thus far are applied to demonstrate that the vital and intellectual principles, the Anima and Animus, are as much a part of us as are our limbs and members, but like those limbs and members have no distinct and independent existence, and that hence soul and body live and perish together; the book concludes by arguing that the fear of death is a folly, as death merely extinguishes all feeling—both the good and the bad.

The fourth book is devoted to the theory of the senses, sight, hearing, taste, smell, of sleep and of dreams, ending with a disquisition upon love and sex.

The fifth book is described by Ramsay as the most finished and impressive, while Stahl argues that its "puerile conceptions" are proof that Lucretius should be judged as a poet, not as a scientist. This book addresses the origin of the world and of all things therein, the movements of the heavenly bodies, the changing of the seasons, day and night, the rise and progress of humankind, society, political institutions, and the invention of the various arts and sciences which embellish and ennoble life.

The sixth book contains an explanation of some of the most striking natural appearances, especially thunder, lightning, hail, rain, snow, ice, cold, heat, wind, earthquakes, volcanoes, springs and localities noxious to animal life, which leads to a discourse upon diseases. This introduces a detailed description of the great pestilence that devastated Athens during the Peloponnesian War. With this episode, the book closes; this abrupt ending suggests that Lucretius might have died before he was able to finalize and fully edit his poem.

=== Purpose ===
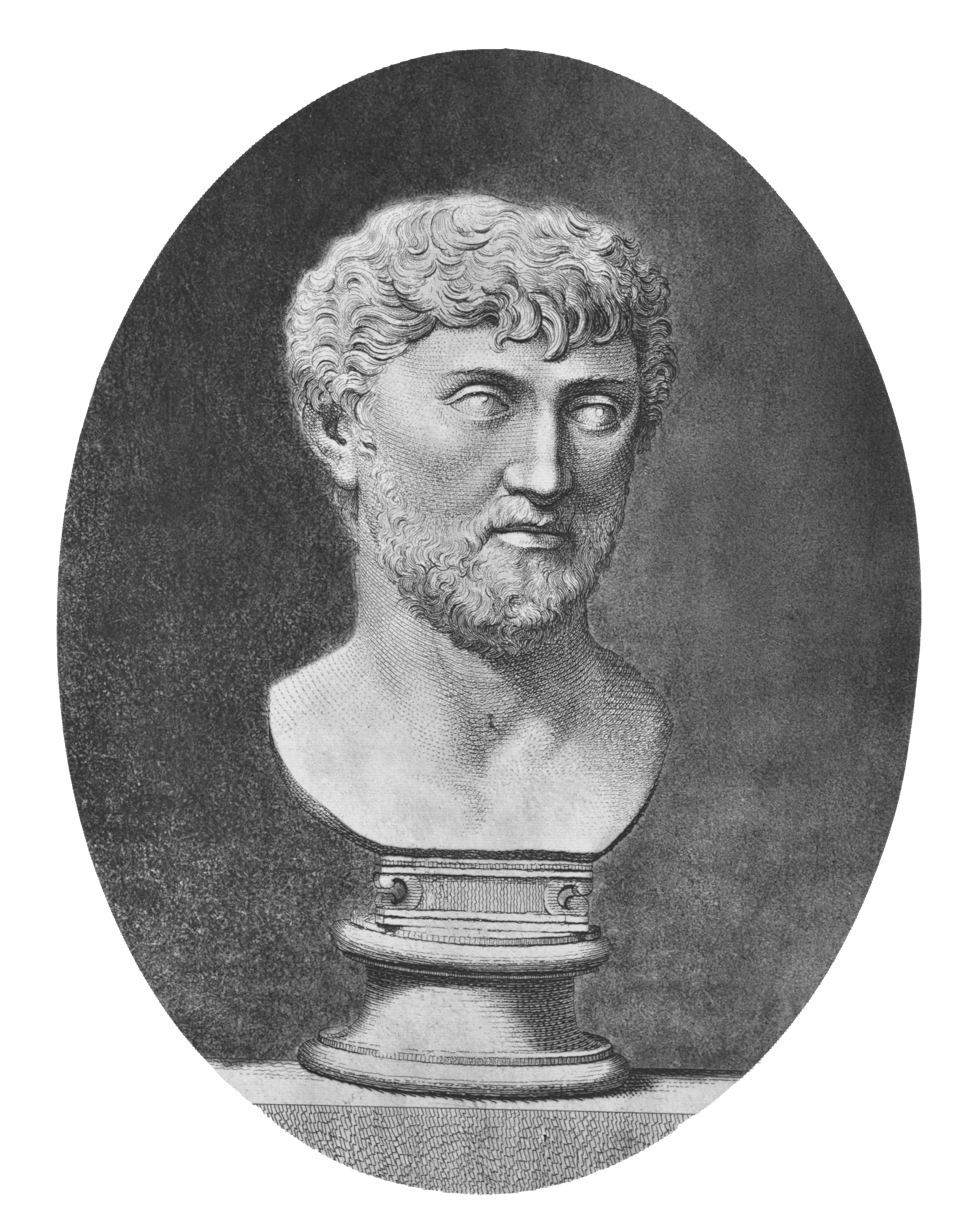
Fictional portrait of the Roman scholar and poet Lucretius, author of De rerum natura

Lucretius wrote this epic poem to "Memmius", who may be Gaius Memmius, who in 58 BC was a praetor, a judicial official deciding controversies between citizens and the government. There are over a dozen references to "Memmius" scattered throughout the long poem in a variety of contexts in translation, such as "Memmius mine", "my Memmius", and "illustrious Memmius". According to Lucretius's frequent statements in his poem, the main purpose of the work was to free Gaius Memmius's mind of the supernatural and the fear of death—and to induct him into a state of ataraxia by expounding the philosophical system of Epicurus, whom Lucretius glorifies as the hero of his epic poem.

However, the purpose of the poem is subject to ongoing scholarly debate. Lucretius refers to Memmius by name four times in the first book, three times in the second, five in the fifth, and not at all in the third, fourth, or sixth books. In relation to this discrepancy in the frequency of Lucretius's reference to the apparent subject of his poem, Kannengiesser advances the theory that Lucretius wrote the first version of De rerum natura for the reader at large, and subsequently revised in order to write it for Memmius. However, Memmius' name is central to several critical verses in the poem, and this theory has therefore been largely discredited. The German classicists Ivo Bruns and Samuel Brandt set forth an alternative theory that Lucretius did at first write the poem with Memmius in mind, but that his enthusiasm for his patron cooled over time. Stearns suggests that this is because Memmius reneged on a promise to pay for a new school to be built on the site of the old Epicurean school. Memmius was also a tribune in 66, praetor in 58, governor of Bithynia in 57, and was a candidate for the consulship in 54 but was disqualified for bribery, and Stearns suggests that the warm relationship between patron and client may have cooled (sed tua me virtus tamen et sperata voluptas / suavis amicitiae quemvis efferre laborem, "But still your merit, and as I hope, the joy / Of our sweet friendship, urge me to any toil").

There is a certain irony to the poem, namely that while Lucretius extols the virtue of the Epicurean school of thought, Epicurus himself had advised his acolytes from penning poetry because he believed it to make that which was simple overly complicated. Near the end of his first book, Lucretius defends his fusion of Epicureanism and poetry with a simile, arguing that the philosophy he espouses is like a medicine: life-saving but often unpleasant. Poetry, on the other hand, is like honey, in that it is "a sweetener that sugarcoats the bitter medicine of Epicurean philosophy and entices the audience to swallow it." (Of note, Lucretius repeats these 25 lines, almost verbatim, in the introduction to the fourth book.)

=== Completeness ===
The state of the poem as it currently exists suggests that it was released in an unfinished state. For instance, the poem concludes rather abruptly while detailing the Plague of Athens, there are redundant passages throughout (e.g., 1.820–821 and 2.1015–1016) alongside other aesthetic "loose ends", and at 5.155 Lucretius mentions that he will spend a great deal of time discussing the nature of the gods, which never appears in the text. Some have suggested that Lucretius died before being able to edit, finalize, and publish his work.

== Main ideas ==
=== Metaphysics ===
==== Lack of divine intervention ====
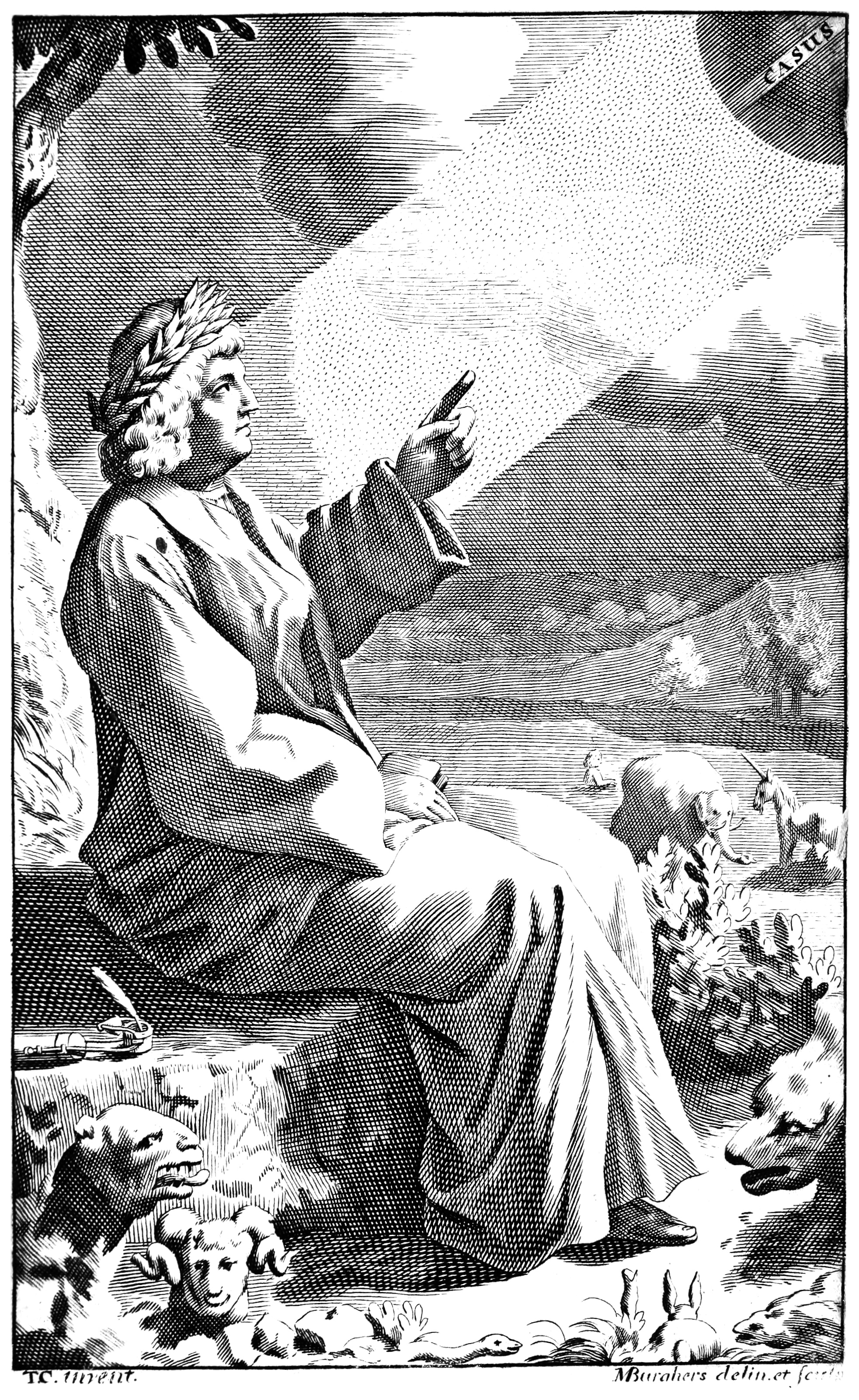
Lucretius pointing to the casus, the downward movement of the atoms. From the frontispiece to Of the Nature of Things, 1682.

After the poem was rediscovered and made its rounds across Europe and beyond, numerous thinkers began to see Lucretius's Epicureanism as a "threat synonymous with atheism." Some Christian apologists viewed De rerum natura as an atheist manifesto and a dangerous foil to be thwarted. However, at that time the label was extremely broad and did not necessarily mean a denial of divine entities (for example, some large Christian sects labelled dissenting groups as atheists). What is more, Lucretius does not deny the existence of deities; he simply argues that they did not create the universe, that they do not care about human affairs, and that they do not intervene in the world. Regardless, due to the ideas espoused in the poem, much of Lucretius's work was seen by many as a direct challenge to theistic, Christian belief. The historian Ada Palmer has labelled six ideas in Lucretius's thought (viz. his assertion that the world was created from chaos, and his denials of Providence, divine participation, miracles, the efficacy of prayer, and an afterlife) as "proto-atheistic". She qualifies her use of this term, cautioning that it is not to be used to say that Lucretius was himself an atheist in the modern sense of the word, nor that atheism is a teleological necessity, but rather that many of his ideas were taken up by 19th-, 20th-, and 21st-century atheists.

==== Repudiation of immortality ====
De rerum natura does not argue that the soul does not exist; rather, the poem claims that the soul, like all things in existence, is made up of atoms, and because these atoms will one day drift apart, the human soul is not immortal. Lucretius thus argues that death is simply annihilation, and that there is no afterlife. He likens the physical body to a vessel that holds both the mind (mens) and spirit (anima). To prove that neither the mind nor spirit can survive independent of the body, Lucretius uses a simple analogy: when a vessel shatters, its contents spill everywhere; likewise, when the body dies, the mind and spirit dissipate. And as a simple ceasing-to-be, death can be neither good nor bad for this being, since a dead person—being completely devoid of sensation and thought—cannot miss being alive. To further alleviate the fear of non-existence, Lucretius makes use of the symmetry argument: he argues that the eternal oblivion awaiting all humans after death is exactly the same as the infinite nothingness that preceded our birth. Since that nothingness (which he likens to a deep, peaceful sleep) caused us no pain or discomfort, we should not fear the same nothingness that will follow our own demise:

Look back again—how the endless ages of time come to pass
Before our birth are nothing to us. This is a looking glass
Nature holds up for us in which we see the time to come
After we finally die. What is there that looks so fearsome?
What's so tragic? Isn't it more peaceful than any sleep?

According to the Stanford Encyclopedia of Philosophy, Lucretius sees those who fear death as embracing the fallacious assumption that they will be present in some sense "to regret and bewail [their] own non-existence."

=== Physics ===
Lucretius maintained that he could free humankind from fear of the deities by demonstrating that all things occur by natural causes without any intervention by the deities. Historians of science, however, have been critical of the limitations of his Epicurean approach to science, especially as it pertained to astronomical topics, which he relegated to the class of "unclear" objects.

Thus, he began his discussion by claiming that he would

explain by what forces nature steers the courses of the Sun and the journeyings of the Moon, so that we shall not suppose that they run their yearly races between heaven and earth of their own free will [i.e., are gods themselves] or that they are rolled round in furtherance of some divine plan....

However, when he set out to put this plan into practice, he limited himself to showing how one, or several different, naturalistic accounts could explain certain natural phenomena. He was unable to tell his readers how to determine which of these alternatives might be the true one. For instance, when considering the reason for stellar movements, Lucretius provides two possible explanations: that the sky itself rotates, or that the sky as a whole is stationary while constellations move. If the latter is true, Lucretius, notes, this is because: "either swift currents of ether whirl round and round and roll their fires at large across the nocturnal regions of the sky"; "an external current of air from some other quarter may whirl them along in their course"; or "they may swim of their own accord, each responsive to the call of its own food, and feed their fiery bodies in the broad pastures of the sky". Lucretius concludes that "one of these causes must certainly operate in our world... But to lay down which of them it is lies beyond the range of our stumbling progress."

Despite his advocacy of empiricism and his many correct conjectures about atomism and the nature of the physical world, Lucretius concludes his first book stressing the absurdity of the (by then well-established) spherical Earth theory, favoring instead a flat Earth cosmology.

Drawing on these, and other passages, William Stahl considered that "The anomalous and derivative character of the scientific portions of Lucretius' poem makes it reasonable to conclude that his significance should be judged as a poet, not as a scientist." His naturalistic explanations were meant to bolster the ethical and philosophical ideas of Epicureanism, not to reveal true explanations of the physical world.

==== The swerve ====
Determinism appears to conflict with the concept of free will. Lucretius attempts to allow for free will in his physicalistic universe by postulating an indeterministic tendency for atoms to veer randomly (Latin: clinamen, literally "the turning aside of a thing", but often translated as "the swerve"). According to Lucretius, this unpredictable swerve occurs at no fixed place or time:

When atoms move straight down through the void by their own weight, they deflect a bit in space at a quite uncertain time and in uncertain places, just enough that you could say that their motion has changed. But if they were not in the habit of swerving, they would all fall straight down through the depths of the void, like drops of rain, and no collision would occur, nor would any blow be produced among the atoms. In that case, nature would never have produced anything.

This swerving provides the indeterminacy that Lucretius argues allows for the "free will which living things throughout the world have" (libera per terras ... haec animantibus exstat ... voluntas).

== Textual history ==
=== Classical antiquity to the Middle Ages ===
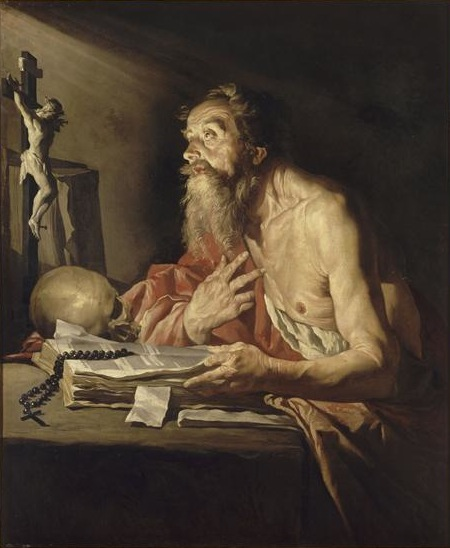
St. Jerome contended in his Chronicon that Cicero amended and edited De rerum natura. This assertion has been hotly debated, with most scholars thinking it was a mistake on Jerome's part.

Martin Ferguson Smith notes that Cicero's close friend, Titus Pomponius Atticus, was an Epicurean publisher, and it is possible his slaves made the very first copies of De rerum natura. If this were the case, then it might explain how Cicero came to be familiar with Lucretius's work. In c. AD 380, St. Jerome would contend in his Chronicon that Cicero amended and edited De rerum natura, although most scholars argue that this is an erroneous claim; the classicist David Butterfield argues that this mistake was likely made by Jerome (or his sources) because the earliest reference to Lucretius is in the aforementioned letter from Cicero. Nevertheless, a small minority of scholars argue that Jerome's assertion may be credible.

The oldest purported fragments of De rerum natura were published by K. Kleve in 1989 and consist of sixteen fragments. These remnants were discovered among the Epicurean library in the Villa of the Papyri, Herculaneum. Because, as W. H. D. Rouse notes, "the fragments are so minute and bear so few certainly identifiable letters", at this point in time "some scepticism about their proposed authorship seems pardonable and prudent." However, Kleve contends that four of the six books are represented in the fragments, which he argues is reason to assume that the entire poem was at one time kept in the library. If Lucretius's poem were to be definitely placed at the Villa of the Papyri, it would suggest that it was studied by the Neapolitan Epicurean school.

Copies of the poem were preserved in a number of medieval libraries, with the three earliest extant manuscripts dating to the ninth century. The oldest—and, according to David Butterfield, most famous—of these is the Codex Oblongus, often called O. This copy has been dated to the early ninth century and was produced by a Carolingian scriptorium (likely a monastery connected to the court of Charlemagne). O is currently housed at Leiden University Libraries as MS VLF 30. The second of these ninth-century manuscripts is the Codex Quadratus, often called Q. This manuscript was likely copied after O, sometime in the mid-ninth century. Today, Q is also housed at Leiden University Libraries as VLQ 94. The third and final ninth-century manuscript—which comprises the Schedae Gottorpienses fragment (commonly called G and located in the Kongelige Bibliotek of Copenhagen) and the Schedae Vindobonenses fragments (commonly called V and U and located in the Austrian National Library in Vienna)—was christened by Butterfield as S and has been dated to the latter part of the ninth century. Scholars consider manuscripts O, Q, and S to all be descendants of the original archetype, which they dub Ω. However, while O is a direct descendant of the archetype, Q and S are believed to have both been derived from a manuscript (Ψ) that in turn had been derived from a damaged and modified version of the archetype (Ω^{I}).

=== Rediscovery to the present ===
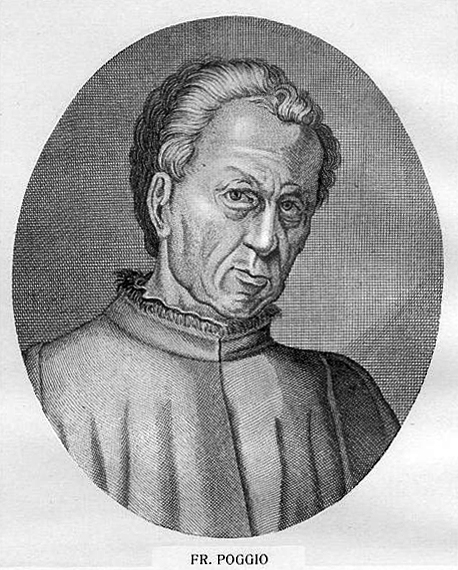
De rerum natura was rediscovered by Poggio Bracciolini c. 1416–1417.

While there exist a handful of references to Lucretius in European sources dating between the ninth and fifteenth centuries (references that, according to Ada Palmer, "indicate a tenacious, if spotty knowledge of the poet and some knowledge of [his] poem"), no manuscripts of De rerum natura are known to survive from this span of time. Rather, all the remaining Lucretian manuscripts, apart from the early three discussed above, that are known date from or after the fifteenth century. This is because De rerum natura was rediscovered in January 1417 by Poggio Bracciolini, who probably found the poem in the Benedictine library at Fulda. The manuscript that Poggio discovered did not survive, but a copy (the "Codex Laurentianus 35.30") of it by Poggio's friend, Niccolò de' Niccoli, did, and today it is kept at the Laurentian Library in Florence.

Machiavelli made a copy early in his life. Molière produced a verse translation which does not survive; John Evelyn translated the first book.

The Italian scholar Guido Billanovich demonstrated that Lucretius' poem was well known in its entirety by Lovato Lovati (1241–1309) and some other Paduan pre-humanists during the thirteenth century. This proves that the work was known in select circles long before the official rediscovery by Bracciolini. It has been suggested that Dante (1265–1321) might have read Lucretius's poem, as a few verses of his Divine Comedy exhibit a great affinity with De rerum natura, but there is no conclusive evidence for this hypothesis.

The first printed edition of De rerum natura was produced in Brescia, Lombardy, in 1473. Other printed editions followed soon after. Additionally, although only published in 1996, Lucy Hutchinson's translation of De rerum natura was in all likelihood the first in English and was most likely completed some time in the late 1640s or 1650s, though it remained unpublished in manuscript.

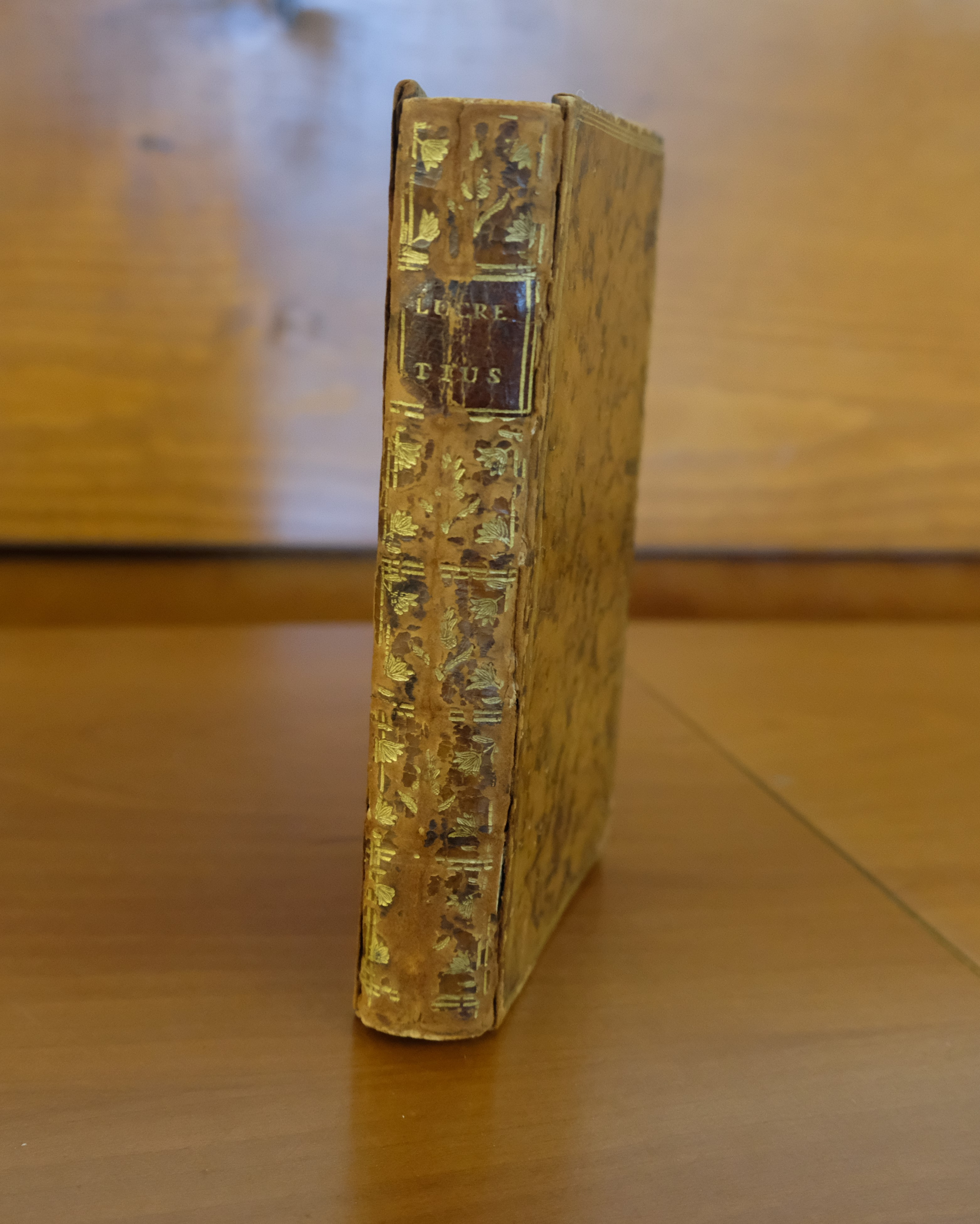
1754 copy of De rerum natura

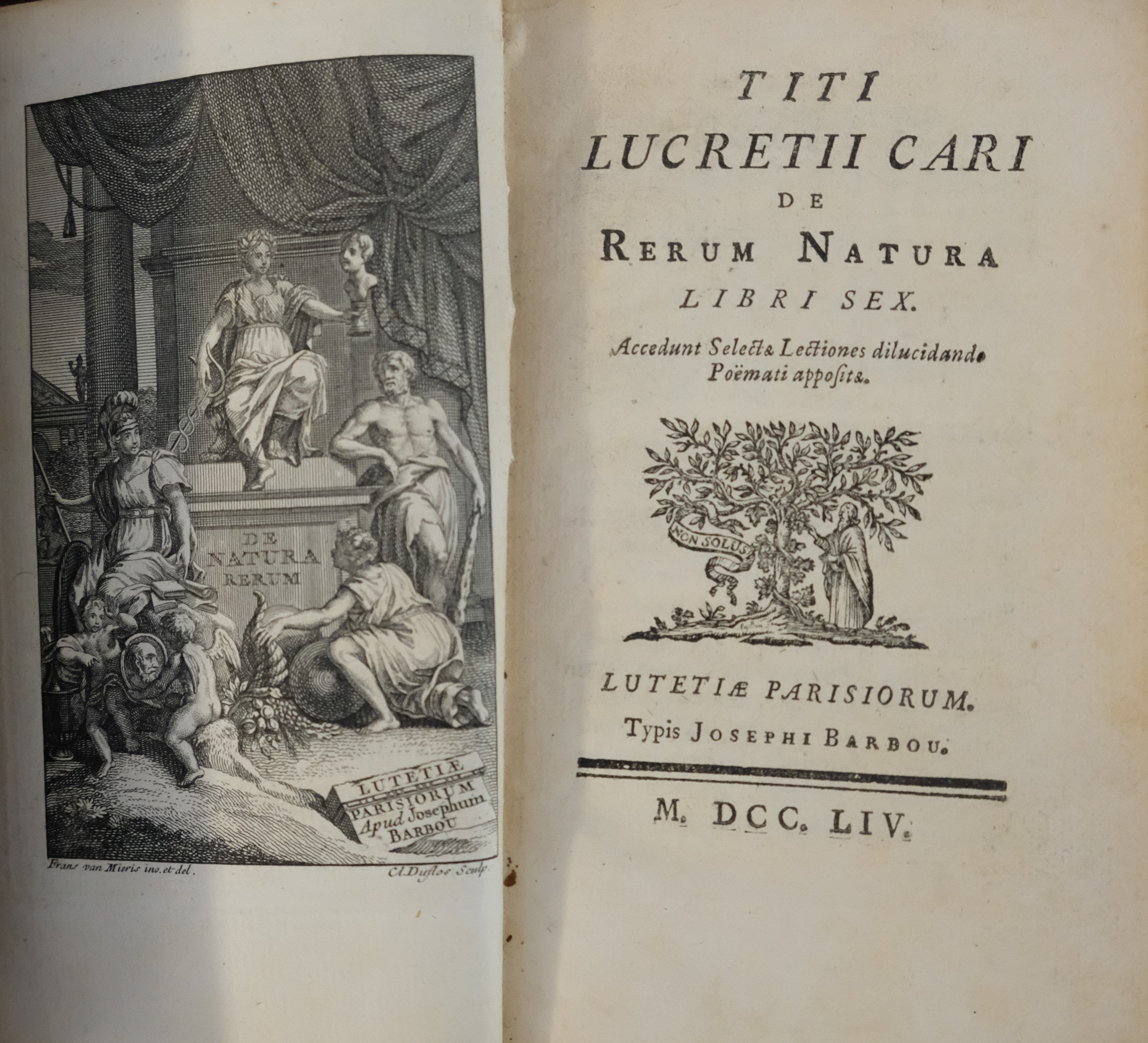
Frontispiece of a 1754 copy of De rerum natura

== Reception ==
=== Classical antiquity ===
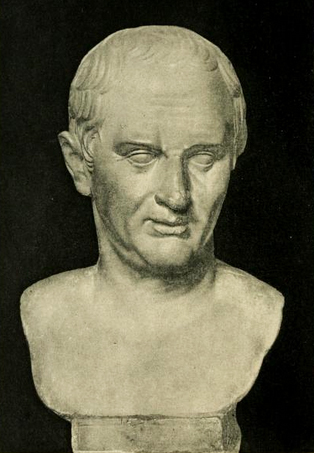
Many scholars believe that Lucretius and his poem were referenced or alluded to by Cicero.

The earliest recorded critique of Lucretius's work is in a letter written by the Roman statesman Cicero to his brother Quintus, in which the former claims that Lucretius's poetry is "full of inspired brilliance, but also of great artistry" (Lucreti poemata, ut scribis, ita sunt, multis luminibus ingeni, multae tamen artis).

It is also believed that G. Julius Caesar alludes to Lucretius' work variously in his Gallic Wars, just as the Roman poet Virgil referenced Lucretius and his work in the second book of his Georgics when he wrote: "Happy is he who has discovered the causes of things and has cast beneath his feet all fears, unavoidable fate, and the din of the devouring Underworld" (felix qui potuit rerum cognoscere causas/atque metus omnis et inexorabile fatum/subiecit pedibus strepitumque Acherontis avari). According to David Sedley of the Stanford Encyclopedia of Philosophy, "With these admiring words, Virgil neatly encapsulates four dominant themes of the poem—universal causal explanation, leading to elimination of the threats the world seems to pose, a vindication of free will, and disproof of the soul's survival after death."

Lucretius was almost certainly read by the imperial poet Marcus Manilius (fl. 1st century AD), whose didactic poem Astronomica (written c. AD 10–20) alludes to De rerum natura in a number of places. However, Manilius's poem espouses a Stoic, deterministic understanding of the universe, and by its very nature attacks the very philosophical underpinnings of Lucretius's worldview. This has led scholars like Katharina Volk to argue that "Manilius is a veritable anti-Lucretius". What is more, Manilius also seems to suggest throughout this poem that his work is superior to that of Lucretius's. (Coincidentally, De rerum natura and the Astronomica were both rediscovered by Poggio Bracciolini in the early 15th century.)

Additionally, Lucretius's work is discussed by the Augustan poet Ovid, who in his Amores writes "the verses of the sublime Lucretius will perish only when a day will bring the end of the world" (Carmina sublimis tunc sunt peritura Lucreti / exitio terras cum dabit una dies), and the Silver Age poet Statius, who in his Silvae praises Lucretius as being highly "learned". David Butterfield also writes that "clear echoes and/or responses" to De rerum natura can be detected in the works of the Roman elegiac poets Catullus, Propertius, and Tibullus, as well as the lyric poet Horace.

In regards to prose writers, a number either quote from Lucretius's poem or express great admiration for De rerum natura, including Vitruvius (in De Architectura), Marcus Velleius Paterculus (in the Historiae Romanae), Quintilian (in the Institutio Oratoria), Tacitus (in the Dialogus de oratoribus), Marcus Cornelius Fronto (in De eloquentia), Cornelius Nepos (in the Life of Atticus), Apuleius (in De Deo Socratis), and Gaius Julius Hyginus (in the Fabulae). Additionally, Pliny the Elder lists Lucretius (presumably referring to his De rerum natura) as a source at the beginning of his Naturalis Historia, and Seneca the Younger quoted six passages from De rerum natura across several of his works.

=== Late antiquity and the Middle Ages ===
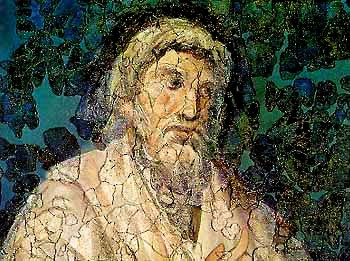
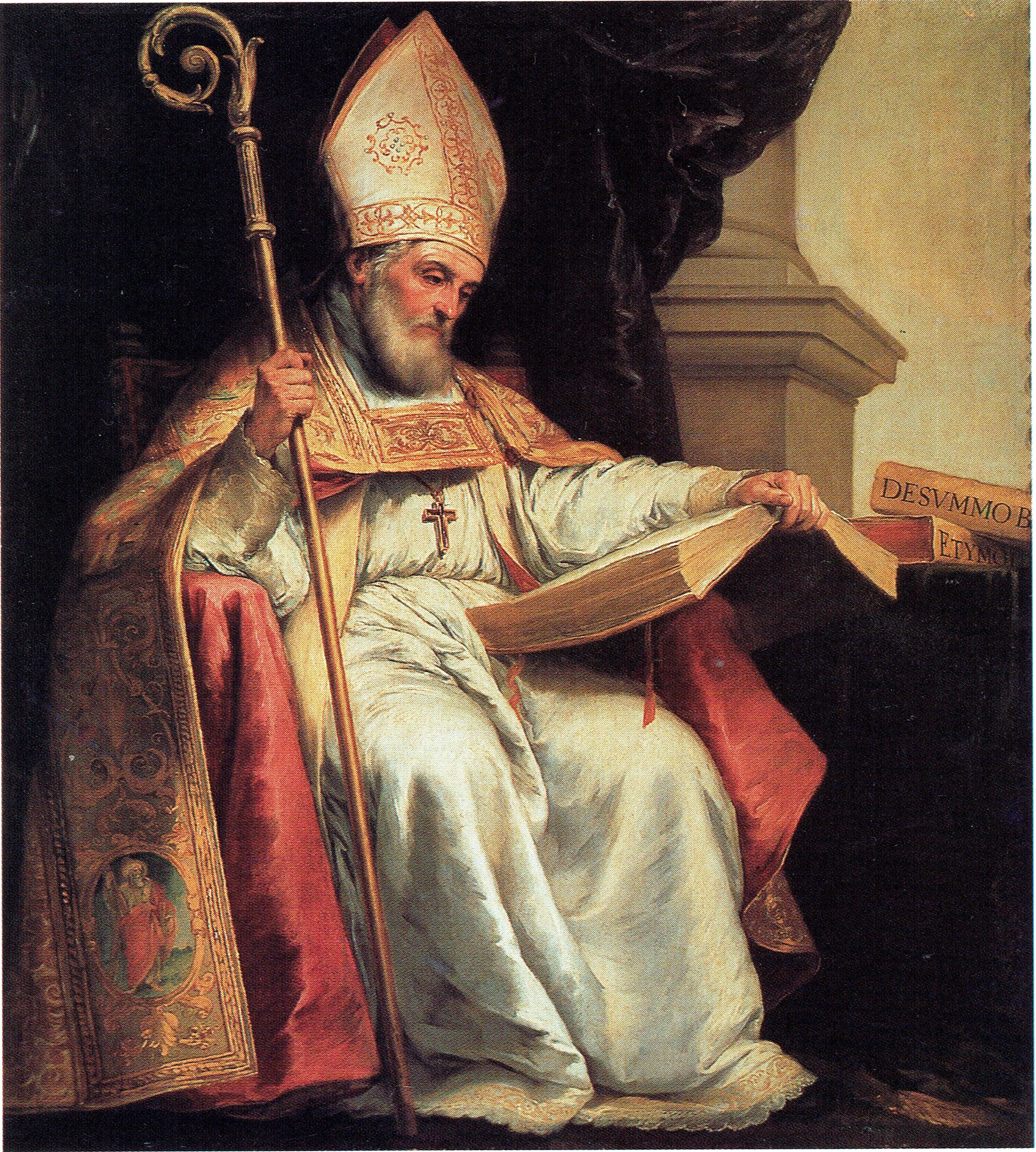
Lucretius was quoted by several early Christian writers, including Lactantius (left) and Isidore of Seville (right).

Because Lucretius was critical of religion and the claim of an immortal soul, his poem was disparaged by most early Church Fathers. The Early Christian apologist Lactantius, in particular, heavily cites and critiques Lucretius in his The Divine Institutes and its Epitome, as well as his De ira Dei. While he argued that Lucretius's criticism of Roman religion were "sound attacks on paganism and superstition", Lactantius claimed that they were futile against the "True Faith" of Christianity. Lactantius also disparages the science of De rerum natura (as well as of Epicureanism in general), calls Lucretius "the most worthless of the poets" (poeta inanissimus), notes that he is unable to read more than a few lines of De rerum natura without laughing, and sarcastically asks, "Who would think that [Lucretius] had a brain when he said these things?"

After Lactantius's time, Lucretius was almost exclusively referenced or alluded to in a negative manner by the Church Fathers. The one major exception to this was Isidore of Seville, who at the start of the 7th century produced a work on astronomy and natural history dedicated to the Visigothic king Sisebut that was entitled De natura rerum. In both this work and his more well-known Etymologiae (c. AD 600–625), Isidore liberally quotes from Lucretius a total of twelve times, drawing verses from all of Lucretius's books except his third. (About a century later, the English historian and Doctor of the Church Bede produced a work also called De natura rerum, partly based on Isidore's work but apparently ignorant of Lucretius's poem.)

=== Renaissance to the present ===
Montaigne owned a Latin edition published in Paris, in 1563, by Denis Lambin which he heavily annotated. His Essays contain almost a hundred quotes from De rerum natura. Additionally, in his essay "Of Books", he lists Lucretius along with Virgil, Horace, and Catullus as his four top poets.

Notable figures who owned copies include Ben Jonson, whose copy is held at the Houghton Library, Harvard; and Thomas Jefferson, who owned at least five Latin editions and English, Italian and French translations.

Lucretius has also had a marked influence upon modern philosophy, as perhaps the most complete expositor of Epicurean thought. His influence is especially notable in the work of the Spanish-American philosopher George Santayana, who praised Lucretius—along with Dante and Goethe—in his book Three Philosophical Poets, although he openly admired the poet's system of physics more so than his spiritual musings (referring to the latter as "fumbling, timid and sad").

In 2011, the historian and literary scholar Stephen Greenblatt wrote a popular history book about the poem, entitled The Swerve: How the World Became Modern. In the work, Greenblatt argues that Poggio Bracciolini's discovery of De rerum natura reintroduced important ideas that sparked the modern age. The book was well-received, and later earned the 2012 Pulitzer Prize for General Nonfiction and the 2011 National Book Award for Nonfiction.

== Editions ==
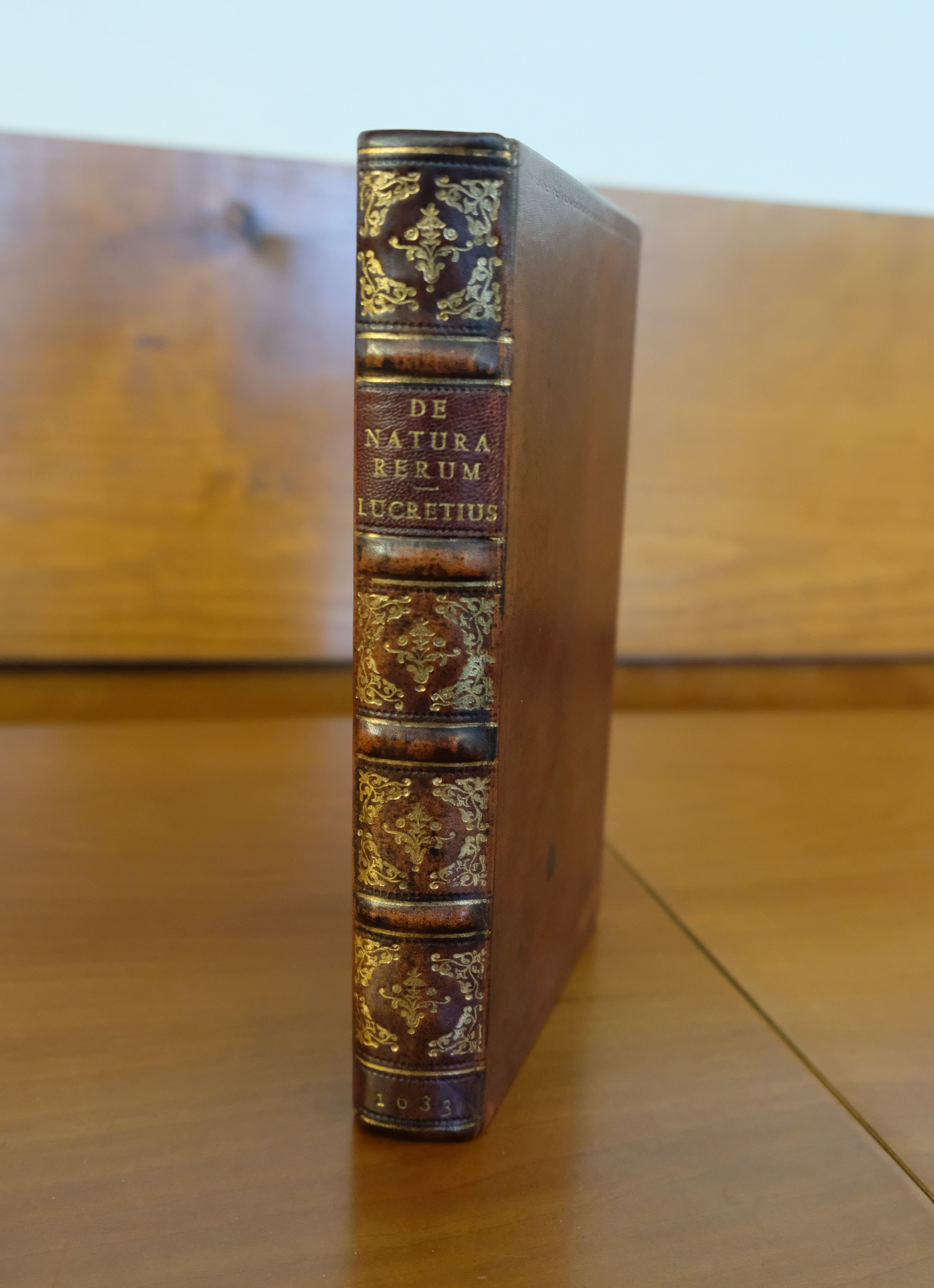
1683 English translation of De rerum natura

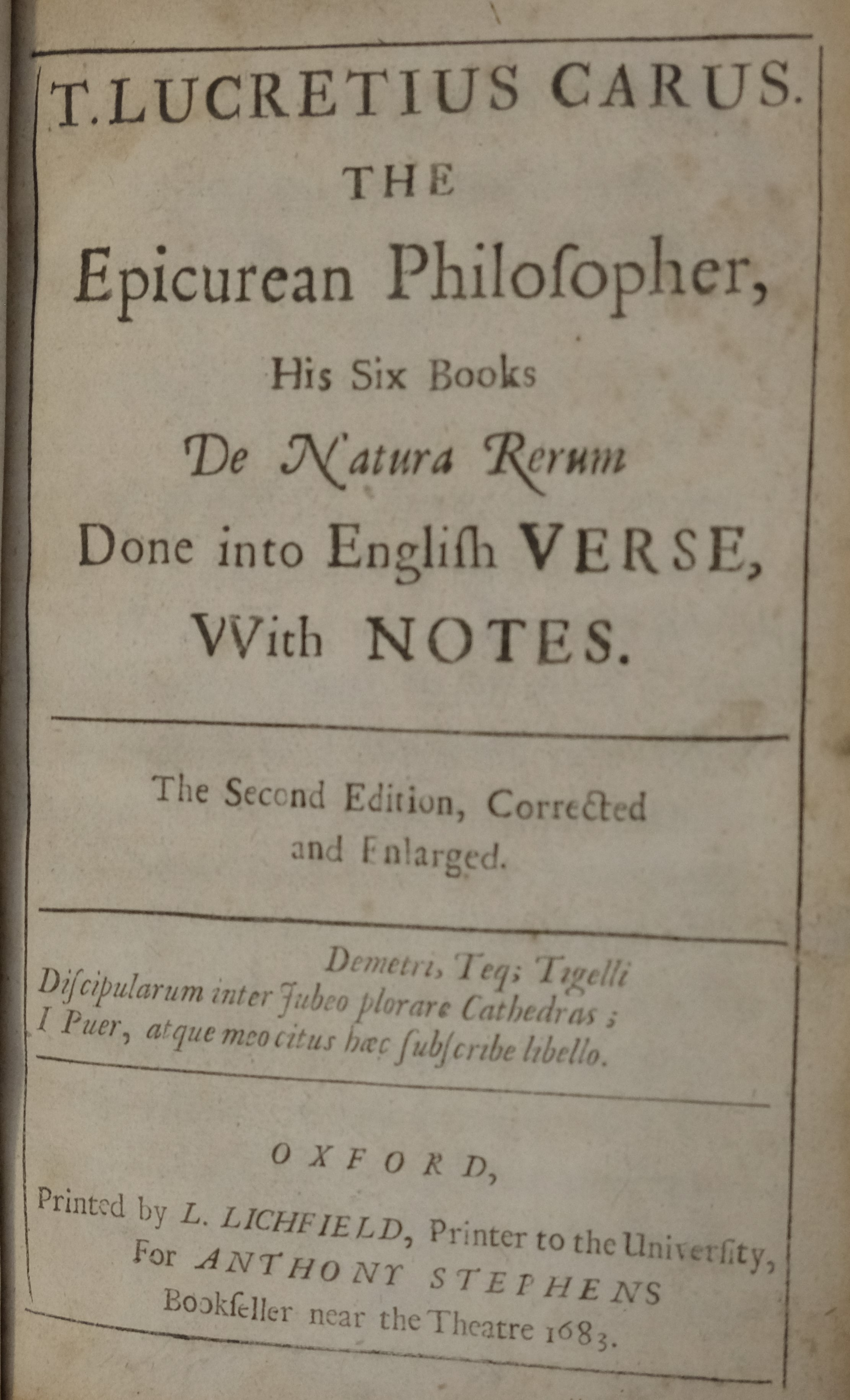
Title page of a 1683 English translation De rerum natura

=== Translations ===
- Lucretius (1968). The Way Things Are: The De Rerum Natura. Translated by Rolfe Humphries. Bloomington, IN: Indiana University Press. ISBN 025320125X.
- ———— (1994). On the Nature of the Universe. Translated by R. E. Latham. London, England: Penguin Books. ISBN 0140446109.
- ———— (1992) [1924]. On the Nature of Things. Loeb Classical Library. Translated by W. H. Rouse. Revised by Martin Ferguson Smith. Cambridge, MA: Harvard University Press. ISBN 0674992008.
- ———— (1995). On the Nature of Things: De rerum natura. Translated by Anthony M. Esolen. Baltimore: The Johns Hopkins University Press. ISBN 080185055X.
- ———— (1998). On the Nature of the Universe. Translated by Ronald Melville. Oxford, UK: Oxford University Press. ISBN 978-0198150978.
- ———— (2001). On the Nature of Things. Hackett Classics Series. Translated by Martin Ferguson Smith. Indianapolis, IN: Hackett Publishing Company. ISBN 0872205878.
- ———— (2007). The Nature of Things. Penguin Classics. Translated by A.E. Stallings. London, England: Penguin Books. ISBN 9780140447965.
- ———— (2008). De Rerum Natura (The Nature of Things): A Poetic Translation. Translated by David R. Slavitt. Oakland, CA: University of California Press. ISBN 9780520942769.
- ———— (2009). Philip De May (ed.). Lucretius: Poet and Epicurean. Cambridge Learning. Cambridge, UK: Cambridge University Press. ISBN 9780521721561.

== Work cited ==
Commentaries

- Beretta, Marco. Francesco Citti (edd), Lucrezio, la natura e la scienza (Firenze: Leo S. Olschki, 2008) (Biblioteca di Nuncius / Istituto e Museo distoria della scienza, Firenze; 66).
- Campbell, Gordon. Lucretius on Creation and Evolution: A Commentary on De rerum natura Book Five, Lines 772–1104 (Oxford: Oxford University Press, 2003).
- Esolen, Anthony M. Lucretius on the Nature of Things (Baltimore, 1995).
- Fowler, Don. Lucretius on Atomic Motion: A Commentary on De rerum natura 2. 1–332 (Oxford: Oxford University Press, 2002).
- Godwin, John. Lucretius (London: Bristol Classical Press, 2004) ("Ancient in Action" Series).
- Melville, Ronald. Lucretius: On the Nature of the Universe (Oxford, 1997).
- Nail, Thomas. Lucretius I: An Ontology of Motion (Edinburgh: Edinburgh University Press, 2018).
- Nail, Thomas. Lucretius II: An Ethics of Motion (Edinburgh: Edinburgh University Press, 2020).

Studies

- Alioto, Anthony M. (1987). A History of Western Science. Englewood Cliffs, NJ: Prentice-Hall. ISBN 0133923908.
- Billanovich, Guido (1958). "'Veterum vestigia vatum' nei carmi dei preumanisti padovani". Italia Medievale e Umanistica (in Italian). I. Padua: Antenore: 155–243. ISBN 978-88-8455-089-7.
- Brandt, Samuel (1885). "Zur Chronologic des Gedichtes des Lucretius und zur Frage nach der Stellung des Memmius in demselben". Jahrbücher für classische Philologie (in German) (31): 601–13.
- Brown, P. Michael, ed. (1997). De rerum natura III. Aris & Phillips. ISBN 0856686948.
- Bruns, Ivo (1884). Lukrez-Studien (in German). Freiburg im Breisgau, Germany: J. C. B. Mohr – via the Internet Archive.
- Bullivant, Stephen; Ruse, Michael, eds. (2013). The Oxford Handbook of Atheism. Oxford, UK: Oxford University Press. ISBN 978-0191667404.
- Butterfield, David (2013). The Early Textual History of Lucretius' De rerum natura. Cambridge, UK: Cambridge University Press. ISBN 978-1107037458.
- Campbell, Gordon (2003). Lucretius on Creation and Evolution: A Commentary on De rerum natura Book Five, Lines 772–1104. Oxford, UK: Oxford University Press. ISBN 0199263965.
- Catto, Bonnie A. (1988). "Venus and Natura in Lucretius: "De Rerum Natura" 1.1–23 and 2.167–74". The Classical Journal. 84 (2): 97–104. JSTOR 3297566.
- DeMay, Philip. Lucretius: Poet and Epicurean (Cambridge; New York: Cambridge University Press, 2009) (Series: Greece & Rome: texts and contexts).
- Deufert, Marcus. Pseudo-Lukrezisches im Lukrez (Berlin-New York, 1996).
- Dronke, Peter (1984). The Medieval Poet and His World. Rome, Italy: Edizioni di Storia e Letteratura.
- Englert, Walter (2003). Lucretius: On the Nature of Things. Newburyport, MA: Focus Publishing. ISBN 978-0941051217.
- Erler M. "Lukrez," in H. Flashar (ed.), Die Philosophie der Antike. Bd. 4. Die hellenistische Philosophie (Basel, 1994), 381–490.
- Fowler, Don (2002). Lucretius on Atomic Motion: A Commentary on De rerum batura, Book Two, Lines 1–332. Oxford, UK: Oxford University Press. ISBN 0199243581.
- Gale, Monica R. (1996) [1994]. Myth and Poetry in Lucretius. Cambridge, UK: Cambridge University Press.
- Gale, Monica R. (2001), Lucretius and the Didactic Epic, London, England: Bristol Classical Press, ISBN 1853995576
- Gale Monica R. (ed.), Oxford Readings in Classical Studies: Lucretius (Oxford: Oxford University Press, 2007).
- Garani, Myrto. Empedocles Redivivus: poetry and analogy in Lucretius. Studies in classics (London; New York: Routledge, 2007).
- Garner, Dwight (September 27, 2011), "An Unearthed Treasure That Changed Things", The New York Times
- "Gian Francesco Poggio Bracciolini". Encyclopædia Britannica. November 7, 2013.
- Gillespie, Stuart; MacKenzie, Donald (2007). "Lucretius and the Moderns". In Gillespie, Stuart; MacKenzie, Donald (eds.). The Cambridge Companion to Lucretius. Cambridge, UK: Cambridge University Press. ISBN 978-0521612661.
- Goldberg, Jonathan (2006). "Lucy Hutchinson Writing Matter". ELH. 73 (1): 275–301. doi:10.1353/elh.2006.0003. S2CID 162125154.
- Gray, John (2018). Seven Types of Atheism. London, England: Allen Lane. ISBN 9780241199411.
- Greenblatt, Stephen (August 8, 2011). "The Answer Man: An Ancient Poem Was Rediscovered—and the World Swerved". The New Yorker. Vol. LXXXVII, no. 23. pp. 28–33. ISSN 0028-792X. Archived from the original on November 15, 2011.
- Greenblatt, Stephen (2011). The Swerve: How the World Became Modern. New York City: W. W. Norton & Company. ISBN 978-0393064476.
- Johnson, W.R (2000). Lucretius and the Modern World. London, England: Duckworth. ISBN 0715628828.
- Keith, Alison (2013). A Latin Epic Reader: Selections from Ten Epics. Mundelein, IL: Bolchazy-Carducci. ISBN 978-1610411103.
- Kendall, Calvin B.; Wallis, Faith, eds. (2010). "Bede and Lucretius". Bede: On the Nature of Things and on Times. Liverpool, UK: Liverpool University Press. pp. 191–2. ISBN 978-1846314957.
- Kennedy, Duncan F. (2002). Rethinking Reality: Lucretius and the Textualization of Nature. Ann Arbor, MI: University of Michigan Press. ISBN 0472112880.
- Leonard, William Ellery (1916). "Proem – Lucr. 1.1". Perseus Project. Tufts University.
- Lewis, Charlton T.; Short, Charles, eds. (1879). "Clinamen". A Latin Dictionary – via the Perseus Project.
- Lloyd, G. E. R. (1973). Greek Science after Aristotle. New York City: W. W. Norton. ISBN 0393043711.
- Lucretius (1893). J. H. Warburton Lee (ed.). T. Lucreti Cari De rerum natura Libri I-III. London, England: Macmillan Publishers.
- Lucretius (1937). Trevelyan, R. C. (ed.). De rerum natura. Cambridge, UK: Cambridge University Press.
- Lucretius (1992) [1924]. "Introduction". On the Nature of Things. Loeb Classical Library. Translated by Rouse, W. H. D. Cambridge, MA: Harvard University Press. ISBN 0674992008.
- Marković, Daniel. The Rhetoric of Explanation in Lucretius' De rerum natura (Leiden, Brill, 2008) (Mnemosyne, Supplements, 294).
- Lucretius (1994). "The Testimony of Lucretius". In Inwood, Brad; Gerson, Lloyd P. (eds.). The Epicurus Reader. Indianapolis, IN: Hackett Publishing. ISBN 9781603845830.
- Lucretius (2009). Philip de May (ed.). Lucretius: Poet and Epicurean. Cambridge Learning. Cambridge, UK: Cambridge University Press. ISBN 978-0521721561.
- Owchar, Nick (November 20, 2011), "Book review: 'The Swerve: How the World Became Modern'", Los Angeles Times
- Palmer, Ada (2014). Reading Lucretius in the Renaissance. Cambridge, MA: Harvard University Press. ISBN 978-0674725577.
- Pope, Michael (May 25, 2023). Lucretius and the End of Masculinity. Cambridge University Press. ISBN 978-1-009-24235-6.
- Ramsay, William (1867). "Lucretius". In William Smith (ed.). Dictionary of Greek and Roman Biography and Mythology. Vol. 2.
- Rumpf L. Naturerkenntnis und Naturerfahrung. Zur Reflexion epikureischer Theorie bei Lukrez (Munich: C.H. Beck, 2003) (Zetemata, 116).
- Santayana, George (1922) [1910]. "Lucretius". Three Philosophical Poets: Lucretius, Dante, and Goethe. Cambridge, MA: Harvard University Press. pp. 19–72.
- Sedley, David (1998). Lucretius and the Transformation of Greek Wisdom. Cambridge, UK: Cambridge University Press. ISBN 0521570328.
- Sedley, David N. Lucretius and the Transformation of Greek Wisdom (Cambridge: Cambridge University Press, 2008 [1998]).
- Sedley, David (August 10, 2013) [2003]. "Lucretius". Stanford Encyclopedia of Philosophy.
- Sheppard, Kenneth (2015). Anti-Atheism in Early Modern England 1580–1720: The Atheist Answered and His Error Confuted. Leiden, Netherlands: Brill Publishers. ISBN 978-9004288164.
- Smith, M. F. (1992) [1924]. "Introduction". On the Nature of Things. Loeb Classical Library. Cambridge, MA: Harvard University Press. ISBN 0674992008.
- Strauss, Leo. "Notes on Lucretius," in Liberalism: Ancient and Modern (Chicago, 1968), 76–139.
- Stahl, William (1962). Roman Science: Origins, Development, and Influence to the Later Middle Ages. Madison, Wisconsin: University of Wisconsin Press. ASIN B003HJJE0I.
- Stearns, John Barker (1931). "Lucretius and Memmius". Classical World. 25.
- Volk, Katharina (2009). Manilius and His Intellectual Background. Oxford, UK: Oxford University Press. ISBN 978-0199265220.
- West, Stephanie (2007). "Terminal Problems". Hesperos: Studies in Ancient Greek Poetry Presented to M. L. West on His Seventieth Birthday. Oxford, UK: Oxford University Press. pp. 3–21. ISBN 978-0199285686.
