= Félix Désiré Dehèque =

French scholar

Félix Désiré Dehèque (9 October 1794 in Paris - 17 December 1870 at Etretat) was a French scholar of Greek antiquity. He died during the siege of Paris.

Dehèque was a student of the Ecole Normale in 1813.

== Biographie ==
A former pupil of the École normale supérieure (Paris), he was first secretary and tutor to the de Montesquiou family, before being awarded the agrégation in grammar classes at Bourges in October 1825. A member of the Académie des Inscriptions et Belles-Lettres, he is notably the author of a Dictionnaire grec moderne-français (1825), and a translation of Lycophron La Cassandre (1853).

His daughter Élisabeth married the Hellenist Émile Egger in 1845.

== Bibliography ==
- http://www.textesrares.com/philo19/noticeAuteur.php?nom_aut=Deh%E8que&prenom_aut=F%E9lix+%5BD%E9sir%E9%5D
