= Lycophron =

4th-century BC Greek poet

Lycophron (/ˈlaɪkəfrɒn/ LY-kə-fron; Ancient Greek: Λυκόφρων ὁ Χαλκιδεύς, romanized: Lukóphrōn ho Chalkidéus; born about 330–325 BC) was a Hellenistic Greek tragic poet, grammarian, and commentator on comedy, to whom the poem Alexandra is attributed (perhaps falsely).

== Life and miscellaneous works ==
He was born at Chalcis in Euboea, and flourished at Alexandria in the time of Ptolemy Philadelphus (285–247 BC). According to the Suda, the massive tenth century Byzantine Greek historical encyclopaedia, he was the son of Socles, but was adopted by Lycus of Rhegium. It is believed that Lycophron was acquaintances with Greek philosopher Menedemus, who may have influenced some of Lycophron's tragedies and even wrote a satyr drama about the man. At an unknown date Lycophron was intrigued by the literary movement in Alexandria and settled there. He was entrusted by Ptolemy with the task of arranging the comedies in the Library of Alexandria; as the result of his labours he composed a treatise On Comedy. Lycophron is also said to have been a skillful writer of anagrams. Like most of his life, the end of Lycophron's life is not documented, but there is some evidence of his death. Although it is not known if he stayed in Alexandria for the rest of his life, what may be his end is told in Ovid's Ibis, "Tuque cothurnatus cecidesse Lycophrona narrant, Haereat in fibris fixa sagitta tuis" (And they say that Lycophron fell in his boots, and let his arrow stick in his bones.)

== Tragedies ==
The poetic compositions of Lycophron chiefly consisted of tragedies, which secured him a place in the Pleiad of Alexandrian tragedians. The Suda gives the titles of twenty tragedies, of which a few fragments have been preserved: Aeolus, Allies (Symmakhoi), Andromeda, Chrysippus, Daughters of Aeolus, Daughters of Pelops, Elephenor, Herakles, Hippolytus, Kassandreis, Laius, Marathonians, Menedemus, Nauplius, Oedipus (two versions), Orphan (Orphanos), Pentheus, Suppliants (Hiketai), Telegonus, and the Wanderer (Aletes). Among these, a few well-turned lines show a much better style than the Alexandra.

== The Alexandra ==
One poem traditionally attributed to him, Alexandra or Cassandra, has been preserved in its complete form. The first mention of Alexandra is from the first century A.D. by the ancient scholiast, whose report is traced back to Theon, an Alexandrian grammarian (first century B.C.). Alexandra runs to 1474 iambic trimeters. It consists of a prophecy uttered by Cassandra and relates the later fortunes of Troy and of the Greek and Trojan heroes. References to events of mythical and later times are introduced, and the poem ends with a reference to Alexander the Great, who was to unite Asia and Europe in his world-wide empire.

The style obtained for the poem's author, even among the ancients, the title of "obscure"; one modern scholar says the Alexandra "may be the most illegible piece of classical literature, one which nobody can read without a proper commentary and which even then makes very difficult reading." The poem is evidently intended to display the writer's knowledge of obscure names and uncommon myths; it is full of unusual words of doubtful meaning gathered from the older poets, and long-winded compounds coined by the author. It was probably written as a show-piece for the Alexandrian school, rather than as straight poetry. It was very popular in the Byzantine period, and was read and commented on very frequently; the manuscripts of the Alexandra are numerous. Two explanatory paraphrases of the poem survive, and the collection of scholia by Isaac and John Tzetzes is very valuable (much used by, among others, Robert Graves in his Greek Myths).

=== Debate over the author of Alexandra ===
Through most of antiquity there seems to be a mostly universal opinion that the tragedy was written by Lycophron. The only real skeptics from antiquity instead believe that Alexandra was rather written by a homonymous poet who probably was a grandson of Lycophron and lived during the first half of the second century B.C.

Many support that it was written by a revisionist. The reasoning behind this is that there are many historical inconsistencies within Alexandra. Many of the key elements of the poem do not line up with the third century B.C., notably its mentions of Rome. Alexandra takes place in the Hellenistic period, and says that Rome was on the rise to be a great world power. An example is in verses 1444-1450, in which the poet describes the Romans' successes against the Macedonians. Many historians believe that for somebody living in the second century B.C., describing the first Macedonian War as a victory for Rome is unfitting; the details and predictions for the Romans’ triumph fit better with the second Macedonian War. Some modern studies have concluded that the Alexandra cannot be the work of the third-century BC author; in one scholar's summary of this view, the poem was:

written in the immediate aftermath of the victory of Flamininus at Battle of Cynoscephalae over Philip V of Macedon in 197/6 BC. The author, whose true name and place of origin are probably concealed beneath the impenetrably enigmatic biographical tradition concerning "Lycophron," probably used the name, and some of the literary substance, of Lycophron, not in emulation, but as an ironic reminiscence of the earlier writer, who had combined the practice of tragedy and the elucidation of comedy. Only on this assumption of a deliberate pseudepigraphon can the full irony of his work be appreciated.

Cassandra prophesies that her Trojan ancestors' descendants "shall with their spears win the foremost crown of glory, obtaining the sceptre and monarchy of earth and sea" and elaborates with allusions to the course of historical events. Some scholars, such as Stephanie West, regard these passages as interpolations and defend the attribution of the bulk of the poem to Lycophron the tragic poet. Thomas Nelson and Katherine Molesworth have argued that 'Lycophron' is a pen name to signpost the poem's style, aligning it with the 'frigidity' of Lycophron the sophist.

Many scholars are certain that the Ptolemaic court would not have commissioned a piece to praise the Romans. Although the Egyptians and Romans had established a political relationship in 273 B.C., the two powers did not do much diplomacy together during the rule of Ptolemy II. Egypt became more dependent on Rome after the second century B.C. when the nation was a shell of its former self due to a series of weak pharaohs. This is why many historians believe that Alexandra was written after the military success of the Roman general Titus Quinctus Flamininus over Philip V of Macedonia at Cynoscephalae, which, if correct, would then give 197 B.C. as a beginning date or creation.

== Editions ==
- Aldus Manutius (1513), Aldine Press, editio princeps
- John Potter (1697, 1702)
- Ludwig Bachmann (1830), with notes and Scaliger's Latin verse translation online
- Félix Désiré Dehèque (1853), with French translation, Latin paraphrase, and notes online
- Gottfried Kinkel (1880)
- Eduard Scheer (1881–1908), including the paraphrases and Tzetzian scholia
- Carl von Holzinger (1895), Teubner edition with German translation and commentary online
- Emanuele Ciaceri (1901), edition with Italian translation and commentary online
- George W. Mooney (1921), edition with facing English translation and explanatory notes. {reprinted Arno Press, 1979]
- Lorenzo Mascialino (1964), Teubner edition
- Pascal Quignard, Lycophron. Alexandra, Paris, Mercure de France (1971)
- André Hurst and Antje Kolde (2008), Budé edition
- Simon Hornblower (repr. 2017), with translation and commentary

== Translations ==
- Philip Yorke, Viscount Royston (1784 - 1808, posthumously published 1832) online
- A. W. Mair (1921), Loeb Classical Library (online at the Internet Archive; online on Google Books)
- George W. Mooney (1921)
