= Ludwig Bachmann =

German classical philologist

Ludwig Gottlob Ernst Bachmann (1 January 1792, in Leipzig – 15 April 1881) was a German classical philologist.

He studied philology in Leipzig, followed by work as a "collaborator" in Halle and as a schoolteacher in Wertheim. In 1825 he embarked on an extended study trip, where he visited libraries in Rome, Naples, Vienna and Paris. In 1829 he obtained his Doctorate of Philosophy.

He later relocated to Rostock, where he served as director of the Große Stadtschule Rostock (1832 to 1865) as well as a professor at the University of Rostock (1833 to 1881). As a professor, he taught classes in ancient literature, archaeology, classical mythology and ancient geography.

His principal works are the two-volume Anecdota Graeca (1829), and an edition of the Greek poet Lycophron, Lycophronis Alexandra (1830). He also published editions and essays on Callimachus, Meletius of Antioch, Manuel Moschopoulos, Theodore II Laskaris and Homer (the Iliad).
