= Ivo Bruns =

German classical philologist

Georg Hermann Ivo Bruns
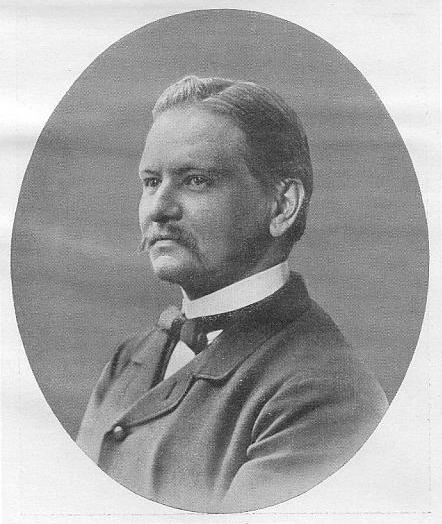
- Born: May 20, 1853
- Died: May 16, 1901 (aged 47)

Academic work
- Discipline: Classical philology
- Institutions: University of Kiel; University of Göttingen

Georg Hermann Ivo Bruns (20 May 1853, Halle an der Saale – 16 May 1901) was a German classical philologist. He was the son of legal scholar Karl Georg Bruns (1816–1880).

He studied classical philology, philosophy and history in Berlin and Bonn, where his instructors included Franz Bücheler (1837–1908), Jacob Bernays (1824–1881) and Hermann Usener (1834–1905). Following graduation (1877), he conducted research on classical literature in Paris (1878–1880). After his return to Germany, he obtained his habilitation at the University of Göttingen, becoming an associate professor in 1883. In February 1890, he was appointed professor of classical philology at the University of Kiel.

== Selected writings ==
- De Legum Platonicarum compositione quaestiones selectae, 1877 (dissertation).
- Plato's Gesetze vor und nach ihrer Herausgabe durch Philippos von Opus : eine kritische Studie, 1880 – Plato's Laws before and after publication by Philippos of Opus - a critical study.
- Supplementum Aristotelicum, 1885.
- De Xenophontis Agesilai capite undecimo, 1895.
- Die atticistischen Bestrebungen in der griechischen Literatur, 1896 – Attic efforts in Greek literature.
- Das literarische porträt der Griechen im fünften und vierten jahrhundert vor Christi geburt, 1896 – Literary portrait of the Greeks in the fifth and fourth centuries BC.
- De Schola Epicteti, 1897.
- Die Persönlichkeit in der Geschichtsschreibung der Alten : Untersuchungen zur Technik der antiken Historiographie, 1898 – Studies on the technology of ancient historiography.
- Frauenemancipation in Athen ein Beitrag zur attischen Kulturgeschichte des fünften und vierten Jahrhunderts, 1900 – Emancipation of women in Athens, a contribution to Attic cultural history of the 5th and 4th centuries BC.
