= List of ancient Greeks =

This an alphabetical list of ancient Greeks. These include ancient people of Greek culture who were also born and have Greek origins and ethnic Greeks from Greece and the Mediterranean world.

== A ==
- Abronychus – Athenian commander and diplomat
- Acacius of Caesarea – bishop of Caesarea
- Acesias – physician
- Acestorides – tyrant of Syracuse
- Achaeus – general
- Achaeus of Eretria – poet
- Achermus – sculptor
- Achilles Tatius – writer
- Acron – physician
- Acrotatus I – son of King Cleomenes of Sparta
- Acrotatus II – King of Sparta, grandson of the above
- Acusilaus – scholar
- Adeimantus – Corinthian general
- Adrianus – sophist
- Aglaophon – painter
- Aedesia – female Neoplatonic philosopher
- Aedesius – philosopher
- Aegineta – modeller
- Aeimnestus – Spartan soldier
- Aelianus Tacticus – military writer
- Aelius Aristides – orator and writer
- Aeneas Tacticus – writer
- Aenesidemus – Sceptic philosopher
- Aeropus I of Macedon – king
- Aeropus II of Macedon – king
- Aesara – female Pythagorean philosopher
- Aeschines Socraticus – Socratic philosopher
- Aeschines – Athenian orator
- Aeschines – Physician
- Aeschylus – playwright
- Aesop – author of fables
- Aetion – painter
- Aetius – philosopher
- Agallis – female grammarian
- Agariste of Sicyon, daughter of the tyrant of Sicyon, Cleisthenes.
- Agariste, daughter of Hippocrates, wife of Xanthippus, and mother of Pericles.
- Agasias – sculptor
- Agasicles – King of Sparta
- Agatharchides – historian and geographer
- Agatharchus – painter
- Agatharchus of Syracuse – naval commander
- Agathias – historian
- Agathinus – medicine
- Agathocles – tyrant of Syracuse
- Agathocles of Bactria – Indo-Greek king
- Agathon – tragic poet
- Agathotychus – veterinary surgeon
- Ageladas – sculptor
- Agesander – sculptor
- Agesilaus I – King of Sparta
- Agesilaus II – King of Sparta
- Agesipolis I – King of Sparta
- Agesipolis II – King of Sparta
- Agesipolis III – King of Sparta
- Agis I – King of Sparta
- Agis II – King of Sparta
- Agis III – King of Sparta
- Agis IV – King of Sparta
- Aglaonike – Thessalian witch
- Agnodike – female Athenian physician and gynecologist
- Agoracritus – sculptor
- Agresphon – philologist
- Agrippa – astronomer
- Agroetas – historian
- Agyrrhius – Athenian politician c. 400 BC
- Albinus – philosopher
- Alcaeus – comic and lyric poet
- Alcaeus of Messene – Greek author of a number of epigrams
- Alcaeus of Mytilene – playwright
- Alcamenes – sculptor
- Alcetas – King of Macedon
- Alcibiades – Athenian general
- Alcidamas – sophist
- Alciphron – sophist
- Alcisthene – female painter
- Alcmaeon of Croton – physician
- Alcman – lyric poet 7th century BC
- Alcmenes – King of Sparta
- Alexander Aetolus – poet
- Alexander Balas – Seleucid king of Syria
- Alexander Cornelius – grammarian
- Alexander I of Epirus- king of Epirus (also known as Alexander Molossus)
- Alexander I of Molossia
- Alexander II of Epirus – king of Epirus
- Alexander II of Molossia
- Alexander of Abonuteichos – cult leader
- Alexander of Aphrodisias – Peripatetic philosopher
- Alexander of Greece – rhetorician
- Alexander of Pherae – tyrant
- Alexander Polyhistor – writer
- Alexander the Great – King of Macedon
- Alexander IV - son of Alexander the Great and Roxana
- Alexander Helios - Son of Cleopatra VII and Mark Antony
- Alexandrides – historian
- Alexias – physician
- Alexion – physician
- Alexis – playwright
- Alexis – sculptor, pupil of Polykleitos
- Alypius of Alexandria – music writer
- Ambryon – writer
- Ameinias of Athens - Athenian commander during the Greco-Persian Wars
- Ameinocles – Corinthian inventor of the trireme
- Ameipsias – Athenian comic poet
- Amelesagoras – writer
- Amelius – philosopher
- Amentes – surgeon
- Ammonianus – grammarian
- Ammonius Grammaticus – writer
- Ammonius Hermiae – philosopher
- Ammonius Saccas – philosopher
- Amphicrates – king of Samos
- Amphis – Middle Comedy poet
- Amynander – king of Athamania
- Amyntas of Mieza – somatophylax of Philip III of Macedon
- Anacharsis – philosopher
- Anacreon – lyric poet 6th century BC
- Anaxagoras – philosopher
- Anaxander – King of Sparta
- Anaxandra – female artist of Sicyon
- Anaxandridas I – King of Sparta
- Anaxandridas II – King of Sparta
- Anaxandrides – philosopher
- Anaxarchus – philosopher
- Anaxidamus – King of Sparta
- Anaxilas of Rhegium – tyrant
- Anaxilas – Middle Comedy poet
- Anaxilaus – physician
- Anaximander – philosopher
- Anaximenes of Lampsacus – historian
- Anaximenes of Miletus – philosopher
- Anaxippus – New Comedy poet
- Andocides – two; Athenian politician, potter
- Andreas – physician
- Andriscus – Adramyttian adventurer
- Andromachus of Cyprus – admiral of Alexander the Great
- Andron – writer
- Andronicus of Cyrrhus – astronomer
- Andronicus Rhodius – Peripatetic philosopher
- Androsthenes – navigator
- Androtion – Athenian politician and writer
- Anniceris – philosopher
- Anonymus (author of Antiatticista), an opponent of Phrynichus Arabius
- Antagoras of Rhodes – writer
- Antalcidas – Spartan general
- Antenor – sculptor
- Anthemius of Tralles – architect
- Anticleides – writer
- Antidorus of Cyme – grammarian
- Antigenes – Attic poet
- Antigonus of Carystus – scholar
- Antigonus II Gonatas – King of Macedon
- Antigonus III Doson – King of Macedon
- Antigonus III of Macedon – King of Macedon
- Antimachus – poet and scholar
- Antimachus I – Greco-Bactrian king
- Antinous – lover of Hadrian
- Antiochis – Seleucid queen of Cappadocia
- Antiochus of Ascalon – philosopher
- Antiochus I Soter – Seleucid king of Syria
- Antiochus II Theos – Seleucid king of Syria
- Antiochus III the Great – Seleucid king of Syria
- Antiochus IV Epiphanes – Seleucid king of Syria
- Antiochus IX Cyzicenus – Seleucid king of Syria
- Antiochus V Eupator – Seleucid king of Syria
- Antiochus VI Dionysus – Seleucid king of Syria
- Antiochus VII Sidetes – Seleucid king of Syria
- Antiochus VIII Grypus – Seleucid king of Syria
- Antiochus X Eusebes – Seleucid king of Syria
- Antiochus XI Ephiphanes – Seleucid king of Syria
- Antiochus XII Dionysus – Seleucid king of Syria
- Antiochus XIII Asiaticus – Seleucid king of Syria
- Antipater I of Macedon – King of Macedon
- Antipater II of Macedon – King of Macedon
- Antipater of Sidon – writer
- Antipater of Tarsus – philosopher
- Antipater of Thessalonica – epigrammatist
- Antipater of Tyre – philosopher
- Antipater – Macedonian general
- Antiphanes – playwright
- Antiphemus – one of the founders of the city of Gela
- Antiphilus – writer
- Antiphon – three; two Athenian orators, tragic poet
- Antisthenes – two; philosopher, writer
- Antonius Diogenes – writer
- Antoninus Liberalis – grammarian
- Antonius Musa - physician to Roman Emperor Augustus
- Antyllus – physician
- Anyte of Tegea – poet
- Anytos – Athenian general
- Apega of Sparta – wife of Nabis
- Apelles – painter
- Apellicon – book collector
- Apion – scholar
- Apollocrates – tyrant of Syracuse
- Apollodorus of Alexandria – physician
- Apollodorus of Athens – scholar
- Apollodorus of Carystus – New Comedy poet
- Apollodorus of Damascus – architect
- Apollodorus of Gela – New Comedy poet
- Apollodorus of Phaleron – student of Socrates
- Apollodorus of Pergamon – rhetor
- Apollodorus of Seleuceia on the Tigris – Stoic philosopher
- Apollodorus – several; painter, grammarian, comic playwright, architect
- Apollodotus I – Indo-Greek king
- Apollonius (finance minister) – finance minister of Egypt
- Apollonius Molon – rhetor

Apollonius Mus – physician

- Apollonius of Citium – physician
- Apollonius of Perga – mathematician
- Apollonius of Rhodes – writer and librarian
- Apollonius of Tyana – Neopythagorean sage
- Apollonius Sophista – scholar
- Apollonius – several; philosopher and mathematician
- Apollophanes – comedian
- Apollos – early Christian
- Appian – historian
- Apsines – Roman-era Athenian rhetorician
- Arachidamia – wealthy Spartan queen
- Araros – son of Aristophanes
- Aratus – two; scholar, statesman

Arcesilaus – four Cyrene kings, philosopher, sculptor

- Archidameia – name of several women
- Archidamis (Ἀρχίδαμις) – daughter of the Spartan King Cleadas
- Archedemus of Tarsus – Stoic philosopher
- Archedicus – New Comedy poet
- Archelaus – King of Macedon
- Archelaus – five; philosopher, Pontic army officer, phrourarch, son of Androcles, Judaean ruler
- Archermus – sculptor
- Archestratus – two; Athenian general, writer
- Archinus – Athenian politician
- Architimus – writer
- Archias – poet
- Archidamus I – King of Sparta
- Archidamus II – King of Sparta
- Archidamus III – King of Sparta
- Archidamus IV – King of Sparta
- Archidamus V – King of Sparta
- Archigenes – physician
- Archilochus – poet
- Archimedes – mathematician
- Archytas – philosopher
- Arctinus – epic poet
- Aretaeus – medical writer
- Aretaphila of Cyrene – noblewoman who deposed the tyrant Nicocrates and his co-conspirators
- Arete of Cyrene – Cyrenaic philosopher, daughter of Aristippus
- Areus I – King of Sparta
- Areus II – King of Sparta
- Argas – notably bad poet
- Argentarius – two; epigrammatist, rhetorician
- Arignote – philosopher; student and perhaps daughter of Pythagoras
- Arimneste – Aristotle's older sister
- Arion – poet
- Aristaeus – mathematician
- Aristagoras – tyrant of Miletus
- Aristander of Telmessus – soothsayer to Alexander the Great
- Aristarchus of Samos – astronomer and mathematician
- Aristarchus of Samothrace – critic and grammarian
- Aristarchus of Tegea – tragedian
- Aristeas – poet
- Aristeus – Corinthian general
- Aristias – playwright
- Aristides of Miletus – writer
- Aristides Quintilianus – writer
- Aristides – three; Athenian statesman, two painters
- Aristippus – philosopher
- Aristobulus of Cassandreia and Aristobulus of Paneas – two; historian, commentator
- Aristocles – three; Spartan general, two scholars
- Aristodemus – three; Spartan hero, Roman hero, historian
- Aristodemus of Cydathenaeum – student of Socrates
- Aristogiton – Athenian tyrannicide
- Aristolycus of Athens – athlete
- Aristomenes – two; Messenian hero, Athenian comedian
- Aristomelidas - Spartan, father of the mother of Agesilaus
- Ariston of Alexandria – philosopher
- Ariston of Ceos – philosopher
- Ariston of Chios – philosopher
- Ariston (king of Sparta) – King of Sparta
- Aristonice – Delphic oracle
- Aristonus of Aegina - sculptor
- Aristonicus of Pergamum – Attalid king of Pergamum
- Aristonicus – grammarian
- Aristonous – citharode
- Aristonymus – comedian
- Aristophanes of Byzantium – scholar
- Aristophanes – playwright
- Aristophon - several people
- Aristotle – two; philosopher, Athenian general
- Aristoxenus – philosopher and music theorist
- Arius Didymus – philosophy teacher
- Arius – Christian heretic
- Arrian – historian
- Arsinoe I of Egypt – Ptolemaic ruler of Egypt
- Arsinoe II of Egypt – Ptolemaic ruler of Egypt
- Arsinoe III of Egypt – Ptolemaic ruler of Egypt
- Artemidorus – three; grammarian, two travellers
- Artemisia I of Caria (fl. 480 BC), queen of Halicarnassus under the First Persian Empire, naval commander during the second Persian invasion of Greece
- Artemisia II of Caria (died 350 BC), queen of Caria under the First Persian Empire, ordered the construction of the Mausoleum at Halicarnassus
- Artemon – engineer
- Artemon – painter
- Artemon – rhetorician
- Artemon – sculptor
- Artemon Melopoios – Melic poet
- Artemon of Clazomenae – annalist
- Artemon of Magnesia – author
- Artemon of Miletus – author
- Artemon of Pergamon – rhetorician
- Arxilaidas (Ἀρξιλαΐδας) – Laconian general
- Asclepiades – Many different people
- Asclepigenia – Athenian mystic and philosopher, daughter of Plutarch of Athens
- Asclepiodotus – scholar
- Asius of Samos – poet
- Asmonius – grammarian
- Aspasia – wife or concubine of Pericles
- Aspasius – philosopher
- Astydamas – three tragic poets
- Astyochus – Spartan general
- Athenaeus – two scholars, physician
- Athenais – prophet who told Alexander the Great of his allegedly divine ancestry
- Athenagoras of Athens – apologist
- Athenippus – physician
- Athenodorus – philosopher
- Athenodorus – actor
- Attalus I – Attalid king of Pergamum
- Attalus II – Attalid king of Pergamum
- Attalus III – Attalid king of Pergamum
- Autocrates – Athenian comic poet
- Autolycus of Pitane – astronomer
- Avaris – priest of Apollo (or Abaris the Hyperborean?)
- Axiochus – Alcmaeonid aristocrat
- Axionicus – Middle Comedy poet
- Axiothea of Phlius – female student of Plato

== B ==
- Babrius – fabulist
- Bacchylides – poet
- Basil of Caesarea – Christian saint
- Basilides – philosopher
- Bathycles of Magnesia – sculptor
- Battus – founder of Cyrene
- Berenice I of Egypt – Ptolemaic ruler of Egypt
- Berenice II of Egypt – Ptolemaic ruler of Egypt
- Berenice IV of Egypt – Ptolemaic ruler of Egypt
- Bias of Priene, one of the Seven Sages of Greece
- Bion
- Bion the Borysthenite
- Biton of Syracuse
- Boethus – several people, including
  - Boethus of Chalcedon (c. 2nd century BCE) – sculptor
  - Boethus of Sidon (Stoic) (fl. 2nd century BCE) – Stoic philosopher
  - Boethus of Sidon (Peripatetic) (c. 75 BCE – c. 10 BCE) – Peripatetic philosopher
- Bolus – writer
- Boukris – pirate
- Brasidas – Spartan general
- Brygus – potter
- Bryson – philosopher
- Bupalus – sculptor

== C ==
- Cadmus of Miletus – one of the first logographers
- Caecilius of Calacte – rhetorician
- Caesarion – son of Cleopatra VII, possibly by Julius Caesar
- Calamis – 2 sculptors
- Calliades – archon of Athens
- Callia – three; Athenian statesman, comic poet, nobleman
- Callias of Syracuse – historian
- Callicrates – architect
- Calicrates of Leontium – Acheaean statesman
- Callicratidas – Spartan general
- Callicratidas of Cyrene, a general
- Callicratides – Spartan general
- Callimachus (polemarch) – Athenian general
- Callimachus (sculptor) – sculptor
- Callimachus – poet
- Callinus – poet
- Calliphon – philosopher
- Callippides – runner
- Callippus – astronomer
- Callisthenes – historian
- Callisthenes (Seleucid)
- Callistratus – four; grammarian, poet, sophist, orator
- Carcinus (writer) – tragedian
- Carneades – philosopher
- Cassander – King of Macedon
- Castor of Rhodes – rhetorician
- Cebes – two philosophers
- Celsus – theologian
- Cephidorus – two; Old Comedy poet, writer
- Cephisodotus – two sculptors
- Cercidas – politician/philosopher/poet
- Cercops of Miletus – poet
- Chabrias – Athenian general
- Chaeremon – tragic poet
- Chaeremon of Alexandria – teacher
- Chaeris – writer
- Chaeron of Pellene – tyrant of Pellene
- Chamaeleon – writer
- Charax (writer) – writer
- Chares of Athens – general
- Chares of Lindos – sculptor
- Chares of Mytilene – historian
- Charidemus – Euboean soldier
- Charillus – King of Sparta
- Chariton – writer
- Charmadas – philosopher
- Charmidas – Athenian noble
- Charmus – Athenian polemarch
- Charon of Lampsacus – writer
- Charondas – lawgiver
- Cheramyes – nobleman of Samos
- Cheilonis (Χειλωνὶς) - wife of the Spartan King Theopompus
- Chilon – Spartan ephor
- Chionides – comic poet
- Choerilus – Athenian tragic poet
- Choerilus of Iasus – epic poet
- Choerilus of Samos – epic poet
- Chremonides – Athenian statesman
- Christodorus – epic poet
- Chrysanthius – philosopher
- Chrysippus – philosopher
- Dio Chrysostom – orator
- John Chrysostom – theologian
- Cimon – Athenian statesman
- Cimon of Cleonae – painter
- Cinaethon of Lacedaemon – epic poet
- Cineas – Thessalian diplomat
- Cineas (Athenian) – fought at the Battle of Mantinea (362 BC)
- Cinesias – Athenian poet
- Cleadas (Κλεάδας) – father of Cheilonis who was the wife of the Spartan King Theopompus
- Cleandridas – Spartan statesman
- Cleanthes – philosopher
- Clearchus of Athens – comic poet
- Clearchus of Herachleia
- Clearchus of Rhegium – sculptor, teacher of Pythagoras
- Clearchus of Sparta – general, son of Rhampias
- Clearchus of Soli – author, pupil of Aristotle
- Clearidas (general) – Spartan general
- Cledonius – grammarian
- Cleidemus – atthidographer
- Cleinias – Athenian general, father of Alcibiades
- Cleisthenes – Athenian statesman
- Cleisthenes of Sicyon – tyrant of Sicyon
- Cleitarchus – historian
- Cleitus – two Macedonian nobles
- Clement of Alexandria – theologian
- Cleombrotus I – King of Sparta
- Cleomedes – astronomer
- Cleomenes I – King of Sparta
- Cleomenes II – King of Sparta
- Cleomenes III – King of Sparta
- Cleomenes (seer) – seer
- Cleomenes of Naucratis – administrator
- Cleon – Athenian statesman
- Cleon of Sicyon – tyrant
- Cleonides – writer
- Cleonymus – Spartan general
- Cleopatra I of Egypt – Ptolemaic ruler of Egypt
- Cleopatra II of Egypt – Ptolemaic ruler of Egypt
- Cleopatra III of Egypt – Ptolemaic ruler of Egypt
- Cleopatra IV of Egypt – Ptolemaic ruler of Egypt
- Cleopatra Thea – Seleucid queen of Syria
- Cleopatra V of Egypt – Ptolemaic ruler of Egypt
- Cleopatra VI of Egypt – Ptolemaic ruler of Egypt
- Cleopatra VII of Egypt – Ptolemaic ruler of Egypt
- Cleopatra Selene II - daughter of Cleopatra VII and Mark Antony and the last of the Ptolemy Dynasty.
- Cleophon – two; Athenian statesman, tragic poet
- Clitomachus (philosopher) – philosopher
- Clitophon – oligarchic statesman
- Cnemus – Spartan general
- Colaeus – explorer
- Colluthus – epic poet
- Colotes (sculptor) – sculptor
- Colotes of Lampsacus – philosopher
- Comeas – archon of Athens
- Conon – Athenian general
- Conon of Samos – astronomer
- Conon (mythographer) – mythographer
- Corinna – poet
- Cosmas Indicopleustes – explorer
- Crantor – philosopher
- Craterus of Macedon – King of Macedon
- Crates of Thebes – philosopher
- Crates of Mallus – grammarian and philosopher
- Crates of Olynthys – architect
- Cratesipolis – queen
- Cratippus – historian
- Cratylus – philosopher
- Creon – archon of Athens
- Cresilas – sculptor
- Critias – one of the Thirty Tyrants
- Critius – sculptor
- Crito – several
- Critolaus – general
- Croesus – king of Lydia
- Ctesias – physician and historian
- Ctesibius – scientist
- Cylon – attempted usurper in Athens
- Cynaethus – writer
- Cynegeirus – heroic soldier
- Cynisca – female Spartan athlete
- Cypselus – tyrant of Corinth

== D ==
- Daimachus – two writers
- Daman – philosopher
- Damascius – philosopher
- Damastes – writer
- Damasias – archon of Athens
- Damatria – Spartan woman
- Damocles – courtier of sword fame
- Damogeron - writer
- Damon of Athens – writer on music
- Damon of Syracuse – philosopher
- Damophilus – painter
- Damophon – sculptor
- Damoxenus (playwright) – New Comedy playwright
- Damoxenus – Boxer
- Damoxenus of Aegae - an Achaean legate
- Daphidas or Daphitas of Telmessos - grammarian
- Dares of Phrygia – writer
- Deinocrates (also spelled Dinocrates) – architect
- Deidamia of Scyros – princess
- Deidamia I of Epirus – princess
- Deidamia II of Epirus – princess
- Deinias – writer of the 4th century BC
- Deiphontes – king of Argos
- Demades – orator
- Demaratus – King of Sparta
- Demetrius – epistolographer
- Demetrius – comic playwright
- Demetrius (son of Pythonax) – companion of Alexander the Great
- Demetrius – rhetorical stylist
- Demetrius – Indo-Greek king
- Demetrius I of Bactria – Greek king of Bactria
- Demetrius I of Syria – Seleucid king of Syria
- Demetrius I Poliorcetes – King of Macedon
- Demetrius II – Indo-Greek king
- Demetrius II of Macedon – King of Macedon
- Demetrius II of Syria – Seleucid king of Syria
- Demetrius III Eucaerus – Seleucid king of Syria
- Demetrius Ixion – grammarian
- Demetrius Lacon – Epicurean philosopher
- Demetrius of Alopece – sculptor
- Demetrius of Magnesia – writer
- Demetrius of Pharos – ruler in Illyria
- Demetrius of Scepsis – grammarian and archaeologist
- Demetrius of Tarsus – grammarian
- Demetrius of Troezen – literary historian
- Demetrius Phalereus – philosopher and statesman
- Demetrius the Cynic – philosopher
- Demetrius the Fair – son of Demetrius I Poliorcetes
- Democedes – physician
- Democritus – philosopher
- Demon – writer
- Demonax – philosopher
- Demonax (lawmaker) – Arcadian lawmaker
- Demophanes – philosopher active in public life
- Demophon (seer)
- Demosthenes (general) – Athenian general
- Demosthenes – Athenian orator
- Demosthenes of Bithynia – poet
- Dercyllidas – Spartan commander
- Dexippus – historian
- Diagoras – poet
- Diagoras of Rhodes (winner of boxing, 79th Olympiad, 464 BC)
- Dicaearchus – geographer
- Dicaeogenes – tragic poet
- Dictys Cretensis – writer
- Dido - Carthaginian Queen founder of Carthage and friend to Timaeus.
- Didymarchus – writer
- Didymus Chalcenterus – grammarian
- Didymus the Blind – theologian
- Didymus the Musician – music theorist
- Dienekes – Spartan officer
- Dinarchus – orator
- Dinocrates (also spelled Deinocrates) – architect
- Dinon – historian
- Dio Cocceianus – orator and philosopher
- Diocles – four; politician, poet, mathematician, rhetor
- Diocles of Carystus – physician
- Diocles of Magnesia – philosopher
- Diodorus of Alexandria – mathematician and astronomer
- Diodorus of Sinope – New Comedy playwright
- Diodorus Cronus – philosopher
- Diodorus Siculus – historian
- Diodotus the Stoic – Cicero's teacher
- Diodotus of Bactria – Seleucid king of Bactria
- Diodotus II – Greco-Bactrian king
- Diodotus Tryphon – Seleucid king of Syria
- Dioetas (Διοίτας) – Achaean general
- Diogenes Apolloniates – philosopher
- Diogenes Laërtius – biographer
- Diogenes of Babylon – philosopher
- Diogenes of Oenoanda – Epicurean
- Diogenes of Sinope – Cynic philosopher
- Diogenes of Tarsus – Epicurean
- Diogenianus – two; Epicurean, grammarian
- Diomedes – grammarian
- Dion – tyrant of Syracuse
- Dionysius Aelius – lexicographer
- Dionysius the Areopagite – Athenian convert
- Dionysius of Byzantium – writer
- Dionysius Chalcus – poet
- Dionysius of Halicarnassus – historian
- Dionysius of Heraclea – writer
- Dionysius Periegetes – geographic writer
- Dionysius of Philadelphia – writer
- Dionysius of Phocaea – Ionian general
- Dionysius of Samos – writer
- Dionysius Scytobrachion – grammarian
- Dionysius of Sinope – Middle Comedy playwright
- Dionysius of Syracuse – tyrant of Syracuse
- Dionysius II – tyrant of Syracuse
- Dionysius of Thebes – poet
- Dionysius Trax or Thrax – grammarian
- Dionysius son of Calliphron – poet
- Dionysodorus – sophist
- Diophantus – mathematician
- Dios – historian
- Dioscorides – Stoic philosopher
- Dioscorides Pedanius – physician
- Diotima – female philosopher
- Diotimus – two; poet, Athenian general
- Diotogenes – Pythagorean writer
- Diphilus – comic playwright
- Dorieus – Spartan prince
- Dorissus – King of Sparta
- Dorotheus of Sidon – astrological poet
- Dorotheus – 6th-century jurist
- Dorotheus of Ascalon - writer
- Dosiadas – poet
- Dositheus – two; astronomer, grammarian
- Draco – Athenian lawmaker
- Dracon – writer
- Dropidas (Δρωπίδας) – father of Cleitus the Black
- Duris – Athenian potter and vase painter
- Duris – historian, tyrant of Samos
- Drusilla (descendant of Cleopatra) - great-granddaughter of Cleopatra VII and Mark Antony

== E ==
- Echecrates – philosopher
- Echestratus – King of Sparta
- Ecphantides – comic playwright
- Ecphantus – philosopher
- Eirenaeus – grammarian
- Eirene – Woman artist
- Elpinice – Athenian noblewoman and daughter of Miltiades, known for confronting Pericles twice.
- Empedocles – philosopher
- Entimus (Ἔντιμος) – one of the founders of the city of Gela
- Entochus – sculptor
- Epaminondas – Theban general
- Epaphroditus of Chaeronea – scholar
- Ephialtes – Athenian statesman
- Ephialtes of Trachis – traitor
- Ephippus – Middle Comedy playwright
- Ephippus – pamphleteer
- Ephorus – historian
- Epicharmus of Kos – writer
- Epicles – name of several different individuals
- Epicrates – Middle Comedy playwright
- Epictetus – philosopher
- Epictetus – Athenian potter and vasepainter
- Epicurus – philosopher
- Epigenes – two playwrights
- Epigenes, son of Antiphon, disciple of Socrates
- Epigenes of Sicyon, tragic poet
- Epilycus – writer
- Epimenides – seer
- Epinicus – comic poet
- Epiphanius of Salamis – theologian
- Epitadas – Spartan general
- Epitadeus – Spartan statesman
- Erasistratus – physician
- Eratosthenes – geographer
- Erinna – poet
- Eriphus – Middle Comedy poet
- Erucius of Cyzicus – writer
- Eryximachus – physician
- Eryxo – Queen of Cyrenaica
- Euangelus – New Comedy poet
- Euanthius – writer
- Eubulides of Miletus – philosopher
- Eubulus (statesman) – Athenian statesman
- Eubulus (playwright) – Middle Comedy playwright
- Eucleidas – King of Sparta
- Eucleides – two; philosopher, archon
- Euclid – mathematician
- Eucratides – Greco-Bactrian king
- Euctemon – astronomer
- Eudamidas I – King of Sparta
- Eudamidas II – King of Sparta
- Eudamidas III – King of Sparta
- Eudemus of Cyprus – philosopher
- Eudemus of Rhodes – philosopher
- Eudorus of Alexandria – philosopher
- Eudoxus of Cnidus – mathematician
- Eudoxus of Cyzicus – explorer
- Eudoxus of Rhodes – historian
- Euenus – poet
- Euetes – writer
- Eugammon – epic poet
- Euhemerus – mythographer
- Eumelus (poet) – Corinthian poet
- Eumenes I – Attalid king of Pergamum
- Eumenes II – Attalid king of Pergamum
- Eumenes of Cardia – secretary
- Eumenius – rhetoric teacher
- Eumolpidae – one of the families who ran the Eleusinian mysteries
- Eunapius – sophist
- Eunomus – King of Sparta
- Euphantus – writer and teacher
- Euphemus – Athenian general
- Euphorion – philosopher
- Euphorion son of Aeschylus – playwright
- Euphranor – sculptor and painter
- Euphron – New Comedy playwright
- Euphronius – potter and vasepainter
- Eupolis – Old Comedy playwright
- Eurybatus – Corcyrean general
- Eurybiades – Spartan general
- Eurycrates – King of Sparta
- Eurycratides – King of Sparta
- Eurydice of Egypt – Ptolemaic queen of Egypt, wife of Ptolemy I Soter
- Eurydice of Athens – A descendant of Miltiades and a wife of Demetrius I of Macedon
- Eurydice (wife of Antipater II of Macedon) – Princess and wife of Antipater II of Macedon
- Eurylochus – Spartan general
- Eurymedon – Athenian general
- Euripides – playwright
- Eurypon – King of Sparta
- Eurysthenes – King of Sparta
- Eusebius of Caesarea – Christian historian
- Euthydemus – sophist
- Euthydemus I – Seleucid king of Bactria
- Euthydemus II – Indo-Greek king
- Euthymides – vasepainter
- Eutychides – sculptor and painter
- Euthyphro – prophet
- Euxenides – playwright
- Evander of Pallantium - A Arcadian King of Arcadia and founder of the city Pallantium, of the Palatine Hill, which would be the future site of Rome, sixty years before the Trojan War.
- Evagoras of Salamis – rebel
- Exekias – potter and vasepainter

== G ==
- Galen – physician
- Gastron (Γάστρων) – Spartan commander
- Gelo – tyrant of Syracuse
- George – Soldier of the Roman Army and Christian Saint
- Gaius Julius Alexion - son of Syrian king Sohaemus and Queen Consort Drusilla
- Glaphya – hetaera
- Glaucus of Chios – inventor of iron welding
- Glaucus of Rhegium – writer
- Glycon – poet
- Glycon of Athens – sculptor
- Gnathaena – courtesan
- Gorgias – two orators
- Gorgidas – Theban military leader
- Gregory of Nyssa – Christian saint
- Gryton – Boeotian potter
- Gylippus – Spartan general
- Gyrtias - Spartan noblewoman

== H ==
- Habron – grammarian
- Hagnodorus – Athenian political figure
- Hagnon – Athenian colonizer
- Hagnon of Tarsus – rhetorician and philosopher
- Hagnothemis – alleged that Alexander the Great had been poisoned
- Harmodius and Aristogeiton – assassins
- Harpalus – friend of Alexander the Great
- Harpalus (son of Polemaeus) – Macedonian statesman
- Hecataeus of Abdera – historian of Egypt
- Hecataeus of Miletus – historian
- Hecatomnus – ruler in Asia
- Hecato of Rhodes – Stoic philosopher
- Hedylus – epigrammatist
- Hegemon of Thasos – parodist
- Hegesander – writer
- Hegesias of Cyrene – philosopher
- Hegesias of Magnesia – historian
- Hegesippus – Athenian statesman
- Hegesippus (poet) – New Comedy poet
- Hegesippus (epigrammatist) – epigrammatist
- Hegesipyle – mother of Cimon
- Hegesistratus – son of Pisistratus
- Hegetorides – a Thasian during the Peloponnesian War
- Heliocles – Greco-Bactrian king
- Heliodorus of Athens – author
- Heliodorus (metrist)
- Heliodorus (surgeon)
- Heliodurus – ambassador
- Hellanicus of Lesbos – logographer
- Helena - mother of Constantine I.
- Hephaestion – Companion of Alexander the Great
- Hephaistio of Thebes – astrologer
- Heracleides – tyrant of Syracuse
- Heraclides Ponticus – philosopher
- Heraclitus – philosopher
- Hermaeus – Indo-Greek king
- Hermagoras – rhetorician
- Hermesianax – poet
- Hermias (philosopher)
- Hermias of Atarneus, tyrant, pupil of Plato
- Hermippus – comic playwright
- Hermocrates – Syracusan general
- Hero of Alexandria – scientist
- Aelius Herodianus – grammarian
- Herodotus – historian
- Herophilus – physician
- Herostratus – arsonist
- Hesiod – poet
- Hesychius of Alexandria – grammarian
- Hicetas – philosopher
- Hiero I of Syracuse – tyrant of Syracuse
- Hiero II of Syracuse – tyrant of Syracuse
- Hierocles of Alexandria – philosopher
- Hierophon – Athenian general
- Hippalus – explorer
- Hipparchus (brother of Hippias) – tyrant of Athens
- Hipparchus – mathematician and astronomer
- Hippias (tyrant) – tyrant of Athens
- Hippias – philosopher
- Hippocleides – archon of Athens
- Hippocrates – two; physician, Athenian general
- Hippodamus – architect
- Hippodamas (Ἱπποδάμας) – Spartan general
- Hippolus – mariner
- Hipponax – poet
- Hipponicus – Athenian general
- Hipponoidas – Spartan general
- Histiaeus – tyrant of Miletus
- Homer – poet
- Hypatia of Alexandria – philosopher
- Hyperbolus – Athenian statesman
- Hypereides – orator
- Hypsicles – mathematician and astronomer
- Hypsicrates – historian
- Herippidas (Ηριπίδας) – Spartan general

== I ==
- Iamblichus (writer) – novelist
- Iamblichus (philosopher) – Neoplatonist philosopher
- Iambulus – writer
- Iasus – two early kings
- Ibycus – poet
- Ictinus – architect
- Idomeneus (writer) – writer of Lampsacus
- Ion of Chios – poet
- Iophon – tragedian
- Iphicrates – Athenian general
- Irenaeus – theologian
- Isaeus – orator
- Isaeus (Syrian rhetor)
- Isagoras – archon of Athens
- Ischolaus (Ἰσχόλαος) – Spartan general
- Isidas (Ἰσίδας) – Spartan who attacked the Theban garrison at the Gytheio
- Isidore of Alexandria – Neoplatonist philosopher
- Isidorus of Miletus – architect
- Isigonus – writer
- Isocrates – rhetorician; Spartan general
- Istros the Callimachean
- Isyllus – poet
- Illithia – birth

== J ==
- Jason of Pherae – Thessalian general
- Justin Martyr – Christian apologist and philosopher
- Justinian I - Byzantine Emperor

== K ==
- Karanus of Macedon – King of Macedon
- Karkinos – painter
- Kerykes – one of the families who ran the Eleusinian mysteries
- Kleoitas – architect
- Koinos of Macedon – King of Macedon

== L ==
- Lacedaimonius – Athenian general
- Lachares – tyrant of Athens
- Laches – Athenian aristocrat and general
- Lacritus – sophist
- Lacydes – philosopher
- Laertes – King of Ithaca, father of Odysseus
- Lagus - husband of Arsinoe of Macedon
- Lais of Corinth – hetaera
- Lais of Hyccara – hetaera
- Laïs (physician) - physician
- Lamachus – Athenian general
- Lamprocles – Athenian musician and poet
- Lamprus of Erythrae – philosopher
- Lanike – mother of Cleitus the Black
- Lasus of Hermione – poet
- Leochares – sculptor
- Leon – King of Sparta
- Leonidas I – King of Sparta
- Leonidas II – King of Sparta
- Leonida of Alexandria – astrologer and poet
- Leonnatus – Macedonian noble
- Leosthenes – Athenian general
- Leotychidas II – King of Sparta
- Leotychides – Spartan general
- Lesbonax – writer
- Lesches – epic poet
- Leucippus – philosopher
- Leucon – Old Comedy poet
- Libanius – writer
- Licymnius of Chios – poet
- Livius Andronicus – poet, dramaturg, colonist and slave
- Lobon – literary forger
- Longinus – literary critic
- Longus – writer
- Lucian – writer
- Lyco – philosopher
- Lycophron – three; poet, son of Periander, Spartan general
- Lycortas – statesman and father of Polybius
- Lycurgus of Arcadia, king
- Lycurgus of Athens, one of the ten notable orators at Athens, (4th century BC)
- Lycurgus (of Nemea), king
- Lycurgus of Sparta, creator of constitution of Sparta
- Lycurgus of Thrace, king, opponent of Dionysus
- Lycurgus, a.k.a. Lycomedes, in Homer
- Lycus – historian
- Lydiadas – Megalopolitan general
- Lygdamis of Naxos – tyrant of Naxos
- Lygdamus – poet
- Lysander – Spartan general
- Lysanias – philologist
- Lysias – orator
- Lysimachus – Macedonian general
- Lysippus – two; poet, sculptor
- Lysis – two; philosopher, actor
- Lysistratus – sculptor

== M ==
- Machaon – Spartan general
- Machon – New Comedy poet
- Magas of Macedon – Macedonian nobleman
- Magas of Cyrene – King of Cyrenaica
- Magas of Egypt – grandson of Magas of Cyrene
- Marcellus of Side – physician and poet
- Marinus – philosopher
- Marion of Tyre – a ruler of Tyre
- Marion of Alexandria – Olympic victor in wrestling and the pancratium; son of Marion. (2nd century CE)
- Marsyas of Pella – writer
- Matris of Thebes – rhetor
- Matron of Pitane – parodist
- Maximinus Daza - last to be referred as Pharaoh of Egypt.
- Maximus of Smyrna – anatomist and philosopher
- Megacles – numerous; archon of Athens, Athenian statesman, various other Athenians
- Megacleidas (Μεγακλείδας) – general
- Megasthenes – traveller
- Meidias – Athenian potter
- Melanippides – poet
- Melanthius – three; tragedian, painter, writer
- Melas – sculptor
- Meleager of Gadara – poet and anthologist
- Meleager of Macedon – King of Macedon
- Melesagoras of Chalcedon – writer
- Meletus – two; tragedian, son
- Melinno – poet
- Melissus of Samos – Eleatic philosopher
- Memnon of Heraclea Pontica – historian
- Memnon of Rhodes – military leader
- Menaechmus – mathematician
- Menander – playwright
- Menander I (Menander I Soter, known in Indian Pāḷi sources as Milinda) – Indo-Greek king
- Menander of Ephesus – writer
- Menander of Laodicea – writer
- Menecrates of Ephesus – poet
- Menecrates of Xanthus – historian
- Menedaius – Spartan general
- Menedemus of Eretria – poet
- Menedemus (Cynic) – Cynic philosopher
- Menelaus (sculptor) – sculptor
- Menelaus of Alexandria – mathematician
- Menestor – botanical writer
- Menexenus – student of Socrates
- Menippus – satirist
- Menippus of Pergamum – writer on geography
- Meno – student of Aristotle
- Menodotus – writer
- Menodotus of Nicomedia – medical writer
- Mentor of Rhodes – military leader
- Mesatos – tragedian
- Metagenes – Athenian comic writer
- Meton – astronomer
- Metrodorus – five:
  - Metrodorus of Chios – philosopher
  - Metrodorus of Lampsacus (the elder) – philosopher
  - Metrodorus of Lampsacus (the younger) – philosopher
  - Metrodorus of Scepsis – writer
  - Metrodorus of Stratonicea – philosopher
- Miciades – Corcyrean general
- Micciades – sculptor
- Micon – Athenian painter and sculptor
- Milo of Croton – athlete
- Miltiades the Younger – Athenian general
- Miltiades the Elder – political refugee and uncle of the above
- Mimnermus – poet
- Mindarus – Spartan general
- Mnasalces – writer
- Mnasippidas (Μνασιππίδας) - general
- Mnaseas – traveller
- Mnesicles – architect
- Mnesimachus – Middle Comedy poet
- Moderatus of Gades – philosopher
- Moeris – Attic lexicographer
- Moiro – poet
- Morsimus – poet
- Moschion (tragic poet) – tragedian
- Moschion (physician) – physician
- Moschus – poet
- Musaeus of Athens – Athenian poet
- Musaeus of Ephesus – Ephesian poet
- Myia – daughter of Pythagoras
- Myron – sculptor
- Myronides – Athenian general
- Myrsilus – historian
- Myrtilus – Athenian comic poet
- Myrtis – Boeotian poet
- Myrtis – Athenian girl, whose remains were discovered in 1994–1995

== N ==
- Saint Nicholas – Bishop of Myra, Christian saint, main inspiration of the Santa Claus
- Nabis – Spartan usurper
- Gregory Nazianzus – Bishop of Constantinople
- Nearchus – Macedonian general
- Neoptolemus of Parion – poet and critic
- Nicander – King of Sparta
- Nicarchus – poet
- Nicias – Athenian statesman
- Nicon (also Nikon) (Νίκων) - a pirate from Pherae
- King Nicias – Indo-Greek king
- Nicocreon – tyrant of Cyprus
- Nicomachus – mathematician and neo-Pythagorean
- Nicomachus of Thebes – painter
- Nicomedes of Sparta, commanded the army of the Peleponnesian League at the Battle of Tanagra (457 BC)
- Nicomedes I of Bithynia – king of Bithynia
- Nicomedes II of Bithynia – king of Bithynia
- Nicomedes III of Bithynia – king of Bithynia
- Nicomedes IV of Bithynia – king of Bithynia

== O ==
- Olympias – mother of Alexander the Great
- Olympiodorus of Thebes – historian
- Onesilas of Salamis – rebel
- Onomarchus – general of the Phocians
- Onomacritus – forger
- Orestes of Macedon – King of Macedon
- Origen – theologian
- Oxylus – son of Haemon

== P ==
- Paches (Πάχης) - Athenian general
- Paeonius – sculptor
- Pagondas – Spartan general
- Palladas – poet
- Pamphilus – grammarian
- Pamphilus – painter
- Pamphilus of Caesarea – theologian
- Panaetius of Rhodes – philosopher
- Pantaleon – Indo-Greek king
- Parmenides – philosopher
- Parmenion – Macedonian general
- Parrhasius – painter
- Paulus Alexandrinus – astrologer
- Paulus Aegineta – physician
- Pausanias of Macedon – King of Macedon
- Pausanias of Sparta – King of Sparta
- Pausanias – traveller
- Pedanius Dioscorides – physician
- Peisander – Athenian statesman
- Peisander (oligarch) (fl. 429 - 411 BCE)
- Peithias – leader of Corcyra
- Pelopidas – Theban statesman
- Pelops of Sparta – King of Sparta
- Perdiccas I of Macedon – King of Macedon
- Perdiccas II of Macedon – King of Macedon
- Perdiccas III of Macedon – King of Macedon
- Periander – tyrant of Corinth, one of the Seven Sages of Greece
- Pericles – Athenian statesman
- Persephone-the goddess of the underworld
- Perseus - Argive King
- Perseus of Macedon – King of Macedon
- Phaedo of Elis – philosopher
- Phaedrus – aristocrat
- Phaenippus – archon of Athens
- Phalaris – tyrant of Agrigentum
- Pharacidas – Spartan admiral
- Pherecydes of Athens – mythographer
- Pherecydes of Syros – philosopher
- Pheretima – Cyrenaean queen
- Phidias – sculptor
- Phidippides – legendary runner
- Philetaerus – Founder of the Attalid dynasty, king of Pergamum
- Philippides of Paiania – Athenian aristocratic oligarch
- Philonides (physician)
- Philip I Philadelphus – Seleucid king of Syria
- Philip II of Macedon – King of Macedon
- Philip II Philoromaeus – Seleucid king of Syria
- Philip III of Macedon – King of Macedon
- Philip IV of Macedon – King of Macedon
- Philip V of Macedon – King of Macedon
- Philippus of Chollidae – neighbour of Plato
- Philistus – historian
- Philitas of Cos – poet and scholar
- Philo – philosopher
- Philo of Byblos – writer
- Philolaus – philosopher
- Philotas – son of Parmenion and Alexander the Great's generals
- Philochorus – historian
- Philocles – Athenian tragic poet
- Philostephanus – a writer
- Philotis (Φιλῶτις) – a woman
- Philoxenios – Indo-Greek king
- Philoxenos of Eretria – painter
- Philoxenus of Leucas – glutton
- Philoxenus – poet
- Phocion – Athenian statesman
- Phocylides – poet
- Phormio – Athenian general
- Phryne – courtesan
- Phrynichus (tragic poet) (6th-5th century BC) – playwright
- Phrynichus (comic poet) (late 5th century BC) - writer of old Attic comedy
- Phrynichus (oligarch) (died 411 BC) - Athenian general who took a leading part in establishing the oligarchy of the Four Hundred
- Pigres of Halicarnassus – poet
- Pindar – poet
- Pirrone – philosopher
- Pisistratus – tyrant of Athens
- Pittacus of Mytilene – one of the Seven Sages of Greece
- Pithios – architect
- Plato – philosopher
- Pleistarchus – King of Sparta
- Pleistoanax – King of Sparta
- Plotinus – philosopher
- Plutarch – biographer
- Polemon (scholarch) – Platonist philosopher
- Polemon of Athens – Stoic philosopher
- Polemon of Laodicea – sophist
- Polybius – historian
- Polycarp – Christian saint
- Polycrates – tyrant of Samos
- Polycrete (Πολυκρίτη) – a woman
- Polydectes – King of Sparta
- Polydorus – King of Sparta
- Polygnotus – painter
- Polykleitos – sculptor
- Polyperchon – Macedonian regent
- Porphyry – philosopher
- Posidippus – comic poet
- Posidippus – epigrammatic poet
- Posidonius – philosopher
- Pratinas – playwright
- Praxilla – poet
- Praxiteles – sculptor
- Procles – King of Sparta
- Proclus – philosopher
- Proclus of Naucratis – rhetorician
- Procopius – prominent late antique Greek scholar from Caesarea Maritima
- Prodicus – philosopher
- Protagoras – philosopher
- Proteas – Athenian general
- Prusias I of Bithynia – king of Bithynia
- Prusias II of Bithynia – king of Bithynia
- Prytanis – King of Sparta
- Psaon of Plataea - writer
- Ptolemaeus of Alorus – military leader
- Ptolemy I of Egypt – Ptolemaic ruler of Egypt
- Ptolemy I of Macedon – King of Macedon
- Ptolemy II of Egypt – Ptolemaic ruler of Egypt
- Ptolemy III of Egypt – Ptolemaic ruler of Egypt
- Ptolemy IV of Egypt – Ptolemaic ruler of Egypt
- Ptolemy IX of Egypt – Ptolemaic ruler of Egypt
- Ptolemy V of Egypt – Ptolemaic ruler of Egypt
- Ptolemy VI of Egypt – Ptolemaic ruler of Egypt
- Ptolemy VII of Egypt – Ptolemaic ruler of Egypt
- Ptolemy VIII of Egypt – Ptolemaic ruler of Egypt
- Ptolemy X of Egypt – Ptolemaic ruler of Egypt
- Ptolemy XI of Egypt – Ptolemaic ruler of Egypt
- Ptolemy XII of Egypt – Ptolemaic ruler of Egypt
- Ptolemy XIII of Egypt – Ptolemaic ruler of Egypt
- Ptolemy XIV of Egypt – Ptolemaic ruler of Egypt
- Ptolemy – geographer
- Ptolemy Philadelphus – son of Antony and Cleopatra
- Ptolemy of Ascalon - grammarian
- Ptolemy of Mauretania - Son of Cleopatra Selene II and Juba II
- Pygmalion - sculptor
- Pyrrho – philosopher
- Pyrrhus of Epirus – king of Epirus
- Pythagoras – mathematician
- Pytheas – explorer
- Pythocles – philosopher
- Pythodorus – Athenian general

== R ==
- Rhianus – poet and grammarian
- Rhoecus – sculptor
- Roxana - wife of Alexander the Great

== S ==
- Sappho – poet
- Satyros – architect
- Satyros I – ruler of Bosporan Kingdom
- Satyrus the Peripatetic – philosopher and historian
- Scopas – sculptor
- Scopas of Aetolia Aetolian politician and general.
- Scylax of Caryanda – explorer
- Seleucus I Nicator – Seleucid king of Syria
- Seleucus II Callinicus – Seleucid king of Syria
- Seleucus III Ceraunus – Seleucid king of Syria
- Seleucus IV Philopator – Seleucid king of Syria
- Seleucus V Philometor – Seleucid king of Syria
- Seleucus VI Epiphanes – Seleucid king of Syria
- Seleucus VII Kybiosaktes – Seleucid king of Syria
- Sextus Empiricus – philosopher
- Simmias – philosopher
- Simonides of Amorgos – poet
- Simonides of Ceos – poet
- Socrates – philosopher
- Socrates Scholasticus – Christian historian
- Socrates the Younger – Platonic philosopher
- Solon – Athens lawmaker, one of the Seven Sages of Greece
- Soos – King of Sparta
- Sopatras – philosopher
- Sophocles – two; playwright, Athenian general
- Sosicles (statesman) – Corinthian statesman
- Sosigenes – inventor of Julian calendar
- Sosthenes of Macedon – King of Macedon
- Sostratus – orator
- Spartacus – Thracian slave
- Speusippus – philosopher
- Spintharus – philosopher
- Spintharus of Corinth – architect
- Sporus of Nicaea – mathematician
- Stateira II - Persian daughter of Darius III and wife of Alexander the Great
- Stypax of Cyprus - sculptor
- Stesichorus – poet
- Stesimbrotus – writer
- Sthenippus (Σθένιππος) – a Laconian
- Stilpo – philosopher
- Stobaeus – biographer
- Strabo – geographer
- Strato of Lampsacus – philosopher
- Straton of Sardis – poet
- Styphon – Spartan general

== T ==
- Teleclus – King of Sparta
- Terence – comedic playwright
- Terpander – poet and musician
- Thais – courtesan
- Thales – philosopher
- Thallus – historian/chronographer
- Theaetetus of Athens – mathematician
- Theagenes of Megara – tyrant
- Theagenes of Rhegium – writer
- Theagenes of Thebes – general who fell at the battle of Chaeronea
- Theages – pupil of Socrates
- Theano – reputedly wife of Pythagoras
- Themistius – philosopher and rhetor
- Themistocles – archon of Athens
- Themistogenes – writer of the Anabasis, presumed since Plutarch to be Xenophon
- Theocritus – poet
- Theodectes – playwright
- Theodorus of Samos – sculptor
- Theodorus of Cyrene – mathematician
- Theodorus of Gadara – rhetor
- Theodotus of Byzantium – theologian
- Theognis of Megara – poet
- Theon of Alexandria – librarian
- Theon of Smyrna – philosopher
- Aelius Theon – rhetor
- Theophilus – Athenian comic poet
- Theophrastus – philosopher
- Theopompus – three;
  - King of Sparta
  - comic poet
  - orator
- Theramenes – Athenian statesman
- Therimenes – Spartan general
- Theron of Acragas – tyrant of Agrigentum
- Thespus – actor
- Thessalus – two physicians
- Thibron (Θίβρων) – Spartan general
- Thorax of Lacedaemonia – Spartan soldier
- Thrasippus – friend of Plato
- Thrasybulus – Athenian general
- Thrasyllus – Athenian general
- Thrasyllus of Mendes - astrologer
- Thrasymachus – rhetorician
- Thrasymelidas – Spartan general
- Thucydides – Athenian statesman
- Thucydides – historian
- Ticidas – erotic poet
- Tiara - a beautiful Greek woman who befriends with Rhea Silvia.
- Tidas – tyrant of Sicyon
- Timachidas – writer
- Timaeus of Tauromenium – historian
- Timaeus of Locri – philosopher
- Timagenes – teacher
- Timanthes – painter
- Timasitheus of Trapezus - diplomat and interpreter
- Timocharis – philosopher
- Timoclea – Theban lady shown mercy by Alexander the Great; sister of Theagenes of Thebes
- Timocles – Middle Comedy poet
- Timocrates – Spartan general
- Timocreon – poet
- Timoleon – Corinthian general
- Timon of Phlius – philosopher
- Timostratus – Athenian comic poet
- Timotheus of Athens – general
- Timotheus of Miletus – poet
- Timotheus (sculptor) – sculptor
- Tisamenus – soothsayer for the Greeks during the Greco-Persian Wars
- Tolmides – Athenian general
- Triphiodorus or Tryphiodorus – epic poet
- Tynnichus – poet
- Tyrannion of Amisus – grammarian
- Tyrimmas of Macedon – King of Macedon
- Tyrtaeus – poet

== U ==
- Ulysses – see Odysseus

== X ==
- Xanthippe – wife of Socrates
- Xanthippus – two; father of Pericles, Spartan mercenary
- Xanthus of Sicily – poet
- Xenagoras – writer
- Xenarchus – Middle Comedy poet
- Xenion - historian
- Xenocles – two playwrights
- Xenoclides – Spartan general
- Xenocrates – philosopher
- Xenocrates of Aphrodisias – physician
- Xenophanes – philosopher
- Xenophilus – philosopher
- Xenophon – soldier and historian
- Xenophon of Ephesus – writer

== Z ==
- Zaleucus – lawgiver of Italian Locri
- Zeno of Citium – philosopher
- Zeno of Elea – philosopher
- Zeno of Rhodes – politician and historian
- Zeno of Sidon – philosopher
- Zenobia - Queen of Palmyra and descendant of Cleopatra VII
- Zenobius – philosopher
- Zenodorus – writer
- Zenodotus – grammarian
- Zeuxidamas – King of Sparta
- Zeuxis and Parrhasius – painters
- Zoilus – grammarian
- Zonis – orator
- Zosimas – historian

== See also ==
- Ancient Greece
- Archons of Athens
- Attalid dynasty
- Antigonid dynasty
- Greco-Bactrian Kingdom
- Indo-Greek kingdom
- Hellenistic Greece
- Kings of Athens
- Kings of Sparta
- List of ancient Romans
- List of ancient Greek cities
- List of ancient Greek tyrants
- List of Greeks
- Ptolemaic dynasty
- Seleucid dynasty
- National Archaeological Museum of Athens
