= Artemon (given name) =

Artemon or Artamon is a given name of Greek origin (Greek: Ἀρτέμων). Notable people with the name include:

- Artemon of Magnesia, writer of unknown time
- Artemon (fl. c. 230 AD), prominent Christian teacher in Rome
- Artemon of Cassandreia, ancient Macedonian grammarian
- Artemon (painter) (fl. c. 300 BC), Ancient Greek painter
- Artemon (royal double) (2nd century BC), stand in for Antiochus the Great
- Artemon of Clazomenae, a writer of unknown age
- Artemon (engineer) (5th century BC), Ancient Greek engineer, constructor of siege machines
- Artemon Melopoios, Greek writer of the 1st century
- Artemon of Pergamon, Greek writer of a history on Sicily, of unknown date
- Artemon of Miletus (1st century AD), Greek author, wrote several books on prophetic dreams and apparitions
- Artemon (rhetorician), rhetorician of probably around the 1st century BCE
- Artemon (sculptor) (1st century BC), Ancient Greek sculptor, known for Greek terracotta figurines
- Artemon (physician), ancient Roman physician of the 1st century CE
- Artemon Apostu-Efremov (born 1979), Romanian tennis player
- Artamon Matveyev (1625–1682), Russian statesman, diplomat and reformer
- Artamon Muravyov, Russian noble, participant of the Decembrist Revolt
- Artamon Putilov (1759–1804), Russian general
- Artémon Simbananiye (1935–2024), Burundian politician

== Fictional characters ==
- Artemon, a poodle in The Golden Key, or The Adventures of Buratino
