= Musaeus =

Musaeus, Musaios (Ancient Greek: Μουσαῖος) or Musäus may refer to:

== Greek poets ==
- Musaeus of Athens, legendary polymath, considered by the Greeks to be one of their earliest poets
- Musaeus of Ephesus, lived after 241 BCE
- Musaeus Grammaticus, lived probably in the beginning of the 6th century
- Musaeus of Massilia, lived in the first half of the 5th century

== Other uses ==
- Musaeus (officer of Antiochus III) (fl. 190 BCE), Seleucid Empire
- Musaeus College, a private girls' school in Colombo, Sri Lanka
- 10749 Musäus, a main belt asteroid
- Musaeus (spider), a spider genus of the family Thomisidae

== See also ==
- Musäus, a surname
