= Sosicles =

Sosicles may refer to:

- Sosicles (sculptor), 2nd-century Roman sculptor
- Sosicles (statesman), 6th-century BC Corinthian politician
- Sosicles (poet), father of the 4th-century tragic poet Sosiphanes
- A character in Plautus's play Menaechmi
