= Antidorus =

Antidorus may refer to:

- Antidorus of Lemnos, 5th century BCE Greek soldier
- Antidorus of Cyme, 4th century BCE grammarian
