= Artemon (disambiguation) =

Artemon (fl. c. 230 AD) was prominent Christian teacher in Rome.

Artemon may also refer to:

- Artemon (given name)
- Greek bow-sail, see foresail
- Artemon (dog) fictional dog from fairy tale The Golden Key, or The Adventures of Buratino
