= Timasitheus =

Timasitheus (Ancient Greek: Τιμασίθεος) may refer to:

- Timasitheus of Croton was an ancient Greek athlete of wrestling
- Timasitheus of Delphi was an ancient Greek athlete of pancratium
- Timasitheus of Lipara, first archon of the city of Lipara
- Timasitheus of Trapezus, a translator from Asia Minor mentioned in Xenophon's Anabasis

== See also ==
- Gaius Furius Sabinius Aquila Timesitheus (died 243), Roman knight of the 3rd century who was the most important advisor to Gordian III
