= Epigenes =

Epigenes may refer to:

- Epigenes of Athens, c. 4th century BC ancient Greek comic poet
- Epigenes of Byzantium (died c. 200 BC), ancient Greek astrologer
- Epigenes of Sicyon, 4th century BC ancient Greek tragedist
- Epigenes, son of Antiphon, a disciple of Socrates
- Epigenes (crater), a lunar crater named after the astrologer

== See also ==
- Epigenesis (disambiguation)
