= Callisthenes (disambiguation) =

Callisthenes (/kəˈlɪsθəˌniːz/) may refer to:

- Callisthenes, a Greek historian
- Callisthenes (Seleucid), a Syrian who was suspected of the burning of the gates of Herod's Temple
- Callisthenes, a subgenus of ground beetles in the genus Calosoma.
