= Agresphon =

Ancient Greek writer

- Born: Ancient Greece
- Occupation: Philologist

Agresphon (Ancient Greek: Ἀγρέσφων), or possibly Agreophon, was an ancient Greek grammarian mentioned in the Suda. He wrote a work on persons with homonymous names, sometimes called in English On Namesakes (Περὶ Ὁμωνύμων).

Agresphon cannot have lived earlier than the reign of Hadrian, as in his work he spoke of an Apollonius who lived in the time of that emperor. Scholars generally date him to the late 3rd or early 4th century.

Agresphon's book on homonymous people was thought to have been similar to, or perhaps dependent upon, a work by Demetrius of Magnesia, which bears the same title, and was written around the 1st century BC. There is some debate as to whether his name was properly "Agresphon" or "Agreophon".

Another, unrelated Agreophon who was father of Zenon around the 3rd century BC is mentioned frequently in the papyri of the Zenon Archive.
