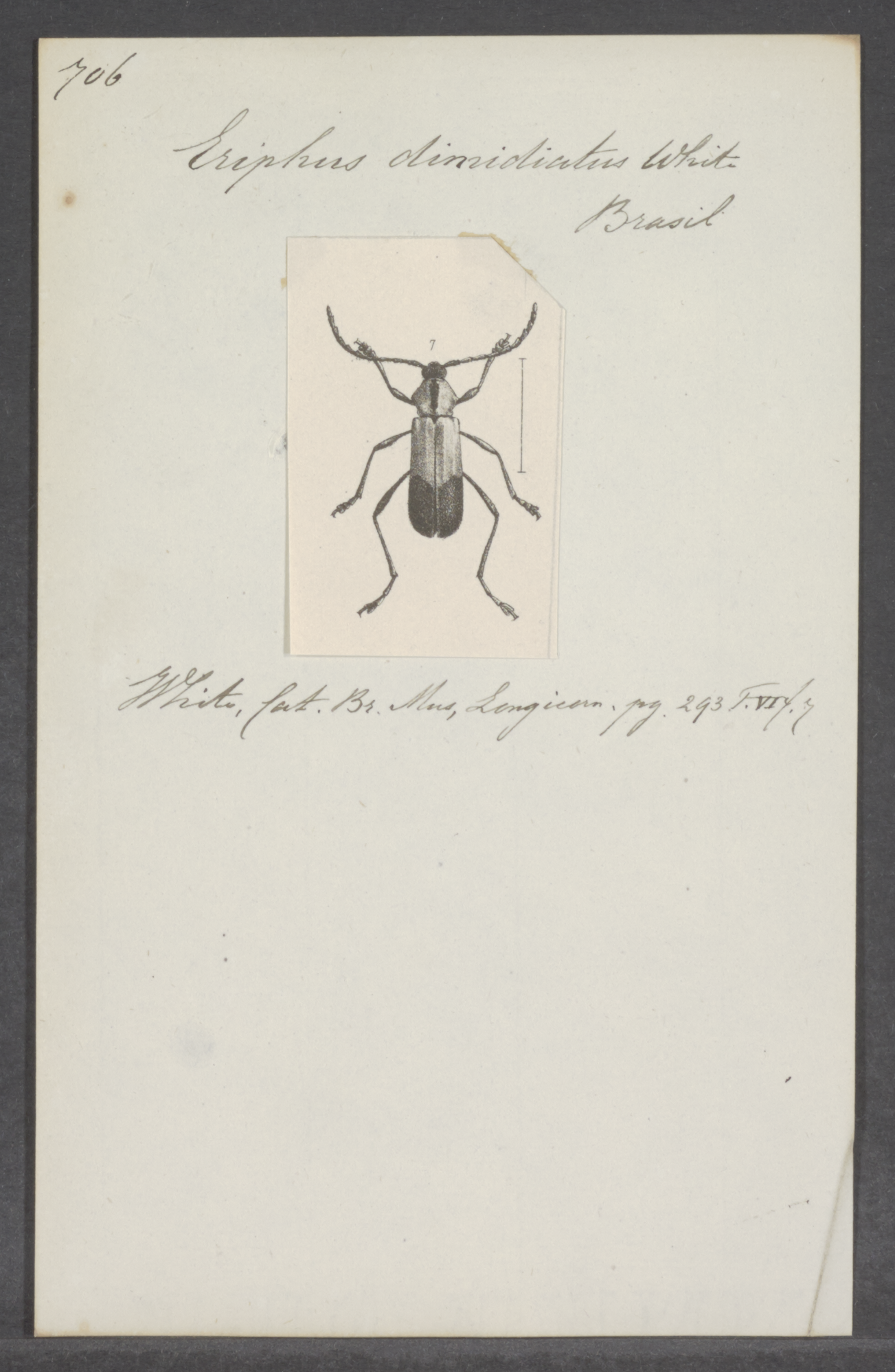

Scientific classification
- Domain: Eukaryota
- Kingdom: Animalia
- Phylum: Arthropoda
- Class: Insecta
- Order: Coleoptera
- Suborder: Polyphaga
- Infraorder: Cucujiformia
- Family: Cerambycidae
- Genus: Eriphus
- Species: E. dimidiatus

Binomial name
- Eriphus dimidiatus White, 1855

= Eriphus dimidiatus =

Species of beetle

Eriphus dimidiatus is a species of beetle in the family Cerambycidae. It was described by White in 1855.
