= Eriphus clarkei =

Scientific classification
- Domain: Eukaryota
- Kingdom: Animalia
- Phylum: Arthropoda
- Class: Insecta
- Order: Coleoptera
- Suborder: Polyphaga
- Infraorder: Cucujiformia
- Family: Cerambycidae
- Genus: Eriphus
- Species: E. clarkei

Binomial name
- Eriphus clarkei Tippmann, 1960

Species of beetle

Eriphus clarkei is a species of beetle in the family Cerambycidae. It was described by Tippmann in 1960.
