= Ammonianus =

5th-century Byzantine grammarian

Ammonianus (Greek: Ἀμμωνιανός) was an ancient Greek grammarian, who lived in the 5th century CE. He was a relation and a friend of the philosopher Syrianus, and devoted his attention to the study of the Greek poets. It is recorded of him that he had an ass, which became so fond of poetry from listening to its master, that it neglected its food.

== See also ==
- List of ancient Greeks
