= Abronychus =

5th-century BC Athenian

Abronychus, also written as Habronichus, (Ancient Greek: Ἁβρώνιχος) was the son of Lysicles and was stationed at Thermopylae with a vessel to communicate between Leonidas and the fleet at Artemisium. He was subsequently sent as ambassador to Sparta with Themistocles and Aristeides respecting the fortifications of Athens after the Persian War.
