= Boethius (disambiguation) =

Boethius was an ancient Roman philosopher.

Boethius, Boëthius, or Boetius may also refer to:

== People ==
- Buíte of Monasterboice (died c. 519–521), Irish monastic saint, also called Boetius
- Boethius (consul 522) (fl. 522–526), son of the Roman philosopher, consul in 522
- Boetius of Dacia (fl. 13th century), Danish philosopher
- Axel Boëthius (1889–1969), Swedish archaeologist
- Hector Boece (or Boethius, or Boyce) (1465–1536), Scottish philosopher and historian
- Jean-Paul Boëtius (born 1994), Dutch footballer
- Manlius Boethius (died c. 487), Roman and Italian aristocrat
- Maria-Pia Boëthius (born 1947), Swedish author
- Boëthius family, a Swedish clerical family

== Other uses ==
- Boethius (lunar crater), located on the east edge of Mare Undarum near the eastern lunar limb
- Boethius (Mercurian crater), located on Mercury

== See also ==
- Boethusians, a sect or community in Judea during the Hellenistic period
- Boethus (disambiguation)
- Boethos (disambiguation)
