= Boethus =

Boethus, Boëthus or Boethos (Ancient Greek: Βόηθος) is a masculine given name which may refer to:

- Hotepsekhemwy (29th century BCE), Egyptian king known in Greek sources as Boethos
- Boethus (Platonist) (4th century BCE), Platonist philosopher
- Boethoi (3rd–2nd century BCE), a family of metalworkers, including
  - Boethos I
  - Boethos II
  - Boethos III
- Boethus of Carthage (c. 2nd century BCE), Greek sculptor
- Boethus of Chalcedon (c. 2nd century BCE), Greek sculptor
- Boethos (gem cutter) (c. 2nd century BCE), Greek gem cutter
- Boethus of Marathon (died 120/119 BCE), Greek philosopher
- Boethus of Sidon (Stoic) (fl. 2nd century BCE), Stoic philosopher
- Boethus of Sidon (Peripatetic) (c. 75 BCE–c. 10 BCE), Peripatetic philosopher
- Boethus of Cilicia (1st century BCE), Roman governor and poet
- Boethus the Epicurean (fl. 1st century CE), Epicurean philosopher
- Boethus, founder of the ancient Jewish sect the Boethusians

== See also ==
- Herod II (died 33/34 CE), Judean prince, sometimes called Herod Boethus
- Titus Flavius Boethus (died 168 CE), Roman senator
- Boethius (disambiguation)
