= Eriphus mexicanus =

Scientific classification
- Domain: Eukaryota
- Kingdom: Animalia
- Phylum: Arthropoda
- Class: Insecta
- Order: Coleoptera
- Suborder: Polyphaga
- Infraorder: Cucujiformia
- Family: Cerambycidae
- Genus: Eriphus
- Species: E. mexicanus

Binomial name
- Eriphus mexicanus Audinet-Serville, 1834

Species of beetle

Eriphus mexicanus is a species of beetle in the family Cerambycidae. It was described by Audinet-Serville in 1834.
