= Cephisia =

Coordinates: 38°05′06″N 23°49′14″E

Cephisia or Kephisia (Ancient Greek: Κηφισιά) was a deme of ancient Attica, of the phyle of Erechtheis, sending six or eight delegates to the Athenian Boule.

Strabo states that Cephisia was one of the twelve original cities of Attica founded by the mythical king of Athens Cecrops II and one of cities Theseus would later unite in the city-state of Athens.

Cephisia had become a famous retreat of philosophers during the reign of the Roman emperor Hadrian, when the wealthy Herodes Atticus of Marathon built the Villa Cephisia. In his Attic Nights, Aulus Gellius describes the unique ambiance of intellectual ferment and aristocratic leisure in an idyllic setting which he created there. It was also the practice of Herodes to provide free instruction in philosophy for selected youths from Athens.

== Location ==
It was located 14.5 kilometres (9.0 mi) to the northeast of Athens, west of Mount Pentelicus (which separates it from the plain of Marathon). It lay almost opposite to the deme of Acharnae. Its site is located near modern Kephisia.

== People ==
- Epigenes, son of Antiphon, confidant of Socrates and with him when he died
- Menander (circa 342-291 BCE), dramatist.
