= Aristonice =

Ancient Greek prophetess

Aristonice (Ancient Greek: Ἀριστονίκη) was an Ancient Greek prophetess who served as the Pythia in the 5th-century BCE and counseled numerous Ancient Greek polities regarding their conduct in the Greco-Persian Wars.

== Prophecies and interpretations ==
According to Herodotus, a 5th-century BCE Greek historian, Aristonice had instructed a Cretan and an Argive delegation to retain neutrality; she warned a Spartan delegation that, should Sparta fight, either their king or their city would fall; and she warned an Athenian delegation to surrender and flee. More specifically, Aristonice warned the Athenians to "φεῦγ᾿ ἔσχατα γαίης" ("pheûg’ éskhata gaíēs"), which the classicist A. D. Godley translates as "flee to the ends of the earth." Alternatively, the philologist Noel Robertson suggests that the term "γαῖᾰ" ("gaîa") may also mean "land" or "country," and therefore the text may refer exclusively to the land of Greece, or—even more specifically—Attica. Consequently, the passage may also be translated as "Flee to the ends of Attica" or "Flee to the ends of Greece," which could itself be interpreted as a reference to the Peloponnese.

The tendency for the Pythia to proscribe neutrality or surrender to Greek cities instead of resisting the Persians may indicate that the oracle had intentionally sought to aid Xerxes in his conquests. However, Robertson suggests that it is unlikely that the city of Delphi would ally with the Persians, as their city was intimately connected with the Peloponnesian League, which was itself staunchly dedicated to resisting occupation. The historian George Beardoe Grundy suggests that the oracle may have believed that the Persian invasion was largely directed against Athens specifically. Therefore, Aristonice may have hoped that—by encouraging the Athenians to migrate—she would remove the casus belli for the Persian offensive, perhaps protecting the other Greek city-states in the process.

Herodotus recounts that the Athenian ambassadors, although initially dejected, were then approached by a prominent resident of Delphi named Timon, who advised them to approach the oracle once more, this time with olive branches. Upon returning to Aristonice, the Athenians supposedly received another prophecy. The second divination opens with a description of Pallas unsuccessfully entreating Zeus, likely—according to Robertson—in reference to the persistent attempts of the Athenians to consult the oracle. Regardless, the messengers, considering the second prophecy to be more propitious than the first, wrote down the oracular response and reported back to the city of Athens. However, Robertson argues that the two prophecies are not dissimilar in content—both beseech the listeners to flee. Aristonice stated that a "wooden wall" would provide safety for the Athenian people, which was interpreted by some Athenians as a reference to wooden ships.

Themistocles, an Athenian politician, convinced the people of Athens that the prophecy actually foretold of a naval victory at Salamis, which caused the Athenian public—now assured of victory— to prepare for war. The prediction of Themistocles eventually became true following the Athenian victory at the Battle of Salamis. Roberton, however, suggests that the passage likely did not allude to ships, as an armed naval resistance would conflict with the previous instructions of the oracle to flee. Other Athenians, particularly—according to Herodotus—the elderly population, interpreted the prophecy as alluding to the wooden wall that had once surrounded the acropolis. Robertson likewise rejects this interpretation, arguing that a wooden wall would be an impractical defensive structure incapable of enduring the Persian advance. Instead, Robertson suggests that the oracle was most likely referring to the impromptu fortifications established to protect the Corinthian isthmus, itself the gateway to the Peloponnese. Thus, Robertson argues that the oracle intended for the Athenians to withdraw to the Peloponnese and regroup with other Greek city-states opposed to the Persians.

It is perhaps possible that the story of the oracle had been heavily altered through oral transmission before it had reached Herodotus. Aeschylus, a 5th-century BCE Greek tragedian, in his play The Persians, describes a ruler of Asia riding a "swift Syrian chariot," which may relate to the mention of "Syrian horses" in the account of Herodotus. These two passages may reflect the same oral tradition—though, it is unclear whether Aeschylus invoked the oracle or vice versa. If the story had acquired a mythic character prior to its codification in the works of Herodotus, then the words of Aristonice may have been reshaped to conform to the customs of dactylic hexameter, a style characteristic of Greek epic literature. However, the historian Peter Green argues that the ambiguous nature of the prophecy best reflects the words of a Pythia who spoke prior to the events of the Greco-Persian Wars and therefore did not already know the outcome. According to Peter Green, had the prophecy been composed at a later date, its authors would be more likely to adjust the prophecy to better align with the ultimate conclusion of the conflict. Green suggests that the exact meaning of the prophecies was likely left intentionally opaque, so as to allow the statements to remain true regardless of the ensuing events.

=== Text of the prophecies ===
Ancient Greek text	Latinized variant of the Ancient Greek text	Translation
ὦ μέλεοι, τί κάθησθε; λιπὼν φεῦγ᾿ ἔσχατα γαίης δώματα καὶ πόλιος τροχοειδέος ἄκρα κάρηνα. οὔτε γὰρ ἡ κεφαλὴ μένει ἔμπεδον οὔτε τὸ σῶμα, οὔτε πόδες νέατοι οὔτ᾿ ὦν χέρες, οὔτε τι μέσσης λείπεται, ἀλλ᾿ ἄζηλα πέλει· κατὰ γάρ μιν ἐρείπει πῦρ τε καὶ ὀξὺς Ἄρης, Συριηγενὲς ἅρμα διώκων. πολλὰ δὲ κἆλλ᾿ ἀπολεῖ πυργώματα κοὐ τὸ σὸν οἶον, πολλοὺς δ᾿ ἀθανάτων νηοὺς μαλερῷ πυρὶ δώσει, οἵ που νῦν ἱδρῶτι ῥεούμενοι ἑστήκασι, δείματι παλλόμενοι, κατὰ δ᾿ ἀκροτάτοις ὀρόφοισι αἷμα μέλαν κέχυται, προϊδὸν κακότητος ἀνάγκας. ἀλλ᾿ ἴτον ἐξ ἀδύτοιο, κακοῖς δ᾿ ἐπικίδνατε θυμόν.	ô méleoi, tí káthēsthe? lipṑn pheûg’ éskhata gaíēs dṓmata kaì pólios trokhoeidéos ákra kárēna. oúte gàr hē kephalḕ ménei émpedon oúte tò sôma, oúte pódes néatoi oút’ ôn khéres, oúte ti méssēs leípetai, all’ ázēla pélei; katà gár min ereípei pûr te kaì oxùs Árēs, Suriēgenès hárma diṓkōn. pollà dè kâll’ apoleî purgṓmata kou tò sòn oîon, polloùs d’ athanátōn nēoùs malerōî purì dṓsei, hoí pou nûn hidrôti rheoúmenoi hestḗkasi, deímati pallómenoi, katà d’ akrotátois oróphoisi haîma mélan kékhutai, proïdòn kakótētos anánkas. all’ íton ex adútoio, kakoîs d’ epikídnate thumón.	Wretches, why tarry ye thus? Nay, flee from your houses and city, Flee to the ends of the earth from the circle embattled of Athens! Body and head are alike, nor one is stable nor other, Hands and feet wax faint, and whatso lieth between them Wasteth in darkness and gloom; for flame destroyeth the city, Flame and the War-god fierce, swift driver of Syrian horses. Many a fortress too, not thine alone, shall he shatter; Many a shrine of the gods he’ll give to the flame for devouring; Sweating for fear they stand, and quaking for dread of the foeman, Running with gore are their roofs, foreseeing the stress of their sorrow; Wherefore I bid you begone! Have courage to lighten your evil.
οὐ δύναται Παλλὰς Δί᾿ Ὀλύμπιον ἐξιλάσασθαι λισσομένη πολλοῖσι λόγοις καὶ μήτιδι πυκνῇ. σοὶ δὲ τόδ᾿ αὖτις ἔπος ἐρέω ἀδάμαντι πελάσσας. τῶν ἄλλων γὰρ ἁλισκομένων ὅσα Κέκροπος οὖρος ἐντὸς ἔχει κευθμών τε Κιθαιρῶνος ζαθέοιο, τεῖχος Τριτογενεῖ ξύλινον διδοῖ εὐρύοπα Ζεύς μοῦνον ἀπόρθητον τελέθειν, τὸ σὲ τέκνα τ᾿ ὀνήσει. μηδὲ σύ γ᾿ ἱπποσύνην τε μένειν καὶ πεζὸν ἰόντα πολλὸν ἀπ᾿ ἠπείρου στρατὸν ἥσυχος, ἀλλ᾿ ὑποχωρεῖν νῶτον ἐπιστρέψας· ἔτι τοι ποτε κἀντίος ἔσσῃ. ὦ θείη Σαλαμίς, ἀπολεῖς δὲ σὺ τέκνα γυναικῶν ἤ που σκιδναμένης Δημήτερος ἢ συνιούσης.	ou dúnatai Pallàs Dí᾿ Olúmpion exilásasthai lissoménē polloîsi lógois kaì mḗtidi puknêi. soì dè tód᾿ aûtis épos eréō adámanti pelássas. tôn állōn gàr haliskoménōn hósa Kékropos oûros entòs ékhei keuthmṓn te Kithairônos zathéoio, teîkhos Tritogeneî xúlinon didoî eurúopa Zeús moûnon apórthēton teléthein, tò sè tékna t᾿ onḗsei. mēdè sú g᾿ hipposúnēn te ménein kaì pezòn iónta pollòn ap᾿ ēpeírou stratòn hḗsukhos, all᾿ hupokhōreîn nôton epistrépsas; éti toi pote kantíos éssēi. ô theíē Salamís, apoleîs dè sù tékna gunaikôn ḗ pou skidnaménēs Dēmḗteros ḕ sunioúsēs.	Vainly doth Pallas strive to appease great Zeus of Olympus; Words of entreaty are vain, and cunning counsels of wisdom. Nathless a rede I will give thee again, of strength adamantine. All shall be taken and lost that the sacred border of Cecrops; Holds in keeping to-day, and the dales divine of Cithaeron; Yet shall a wood-built wall by Zeus all-seeing be granted Unto the Trito-born, a stronghold for thee and thy children. Bide not still in thy place for the host that cometh from landward, Cometh with horsemen and foot; but rather with draw at his coming, Turning thy back to the foe; thou yet shalt meet him in battle. Salamis, isle divine! ’tis writ that children of women Thou shalt destroy one day, in the season of seedtime or harvest.

== Chronology and dating ==
The exact chronology of the events is uncertain. Herodotus concludes the description of the prophecies with verb ἐγεγόνεε, which is inflected for the pluperfect tense, a grammatical category in Ancient Greek utilized to express events occurring prior to another specified point in time. This phrase may indicate that—at least according to Herodotus—the oracles were delivered prior to the assembly of "all the Greeks" described in the ensuing passages. This assembly may itself represent the Congress at the Isthmus of Corinth in 481 BCE, at which various Greek poleis attempted to organize a resistance against the Persians. Alternatively, the classicist James Allan Stewart Evans argues that the final pluperfect is unrelated to the subsequent topics and merely refers back to the introduction of the first prophecies. The second prophecy may reference Salamis as possible site for a future battle, which—presuming that the oracle could not truly foresee the future—may itself indicate that the Greek coalition was already planning the historical Battle of Salamis in 480 BCE. However, Herodotus otherwise suggests that the choice of battle at Salamis was an impromptu decision made by the Athenians as a result of the inability of the Peloponnesian forces to reach Boeotia. Yet, this account of Herodotus is contradicted by the Themistocles Decree, a document of dubious authenticity which claims that the decision to abandon Attica as a pre-determined plan.

In the second prophecy, the oracle references the arrival of cavalry and foot infantry from the mainland, which—according to the classicist Jules Labarbe—may indicate that the events occurred in 480 BCE, whilst the Persian army was stilling crossing into Greece from Anatolia. The classicists Joseph Wells and W.W. How argue that the somber tone of the oracle indicates that the Greek military situation had deteriorated significantly, likely as a consequence of the retreat of the Greek coalition from the Vale of Tempe in 480 BCE and the Persian invasion of Thessaly. Wells and How suggest that the prophecies must have been offered prior to the Greek defeat at Thermopylae in 480 BCE, as there would not be sufficient time available for the Athenians to send two delegations to the Pythia. Moreover, the historian J.A.S. Evans notes that Herodotus himself recounts a tale whereby Macedonian messengers supposedly informed the Greeks at Tempe of the size of the Persian force. If this story is to be accepted, then it indicates that the Greeks were not fully aware of the threat imposed by the Persians until 480 BCE, thereby removing any apparent justification for the oracle to express such despair in 481 BCE.
