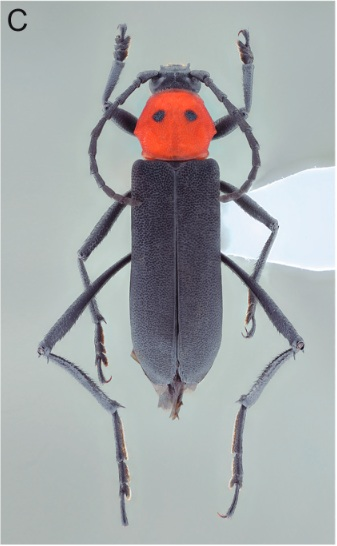

Scientific classification
- Kingdom: Animalia
- Phylum: Arthropoda
- Clade: Pancrustacea
- Class: Insecta
- Order: Coleoptera
- Suborder: Polyphaga
- Infraorder: Cucujiformia
- Family: Cerambycidae
- Genus: Eriphus
- Species: E. bisignatus

Binomial name
- Eriphus bisignatus (Germar, 1824)

Synonyms
- Callidium (Clytus) bisignatum Germar, 1823; Eriphus luctuosus Chevrolat, 1863; Eriphus niger Fuchs, 1974

= Eriphus bisignatus =

Species of beetle

Eriphus bisignatus is a species of beetle in the family Cerambycidae. It was first described by Ernst Friedrich Germar in 1824. It is found in Brazil (Bahia, Goiás, Minas Gerais, Espirito Santo, Rio de Janeiro, São Paulo).
