= Amelesagoras =

Ancient Greek historian

Amelesagoras (Ancient Greek: Ἀμελησαγόρας) or Melesagoras (Μελησαγόρας, as he is called by others) of Chalcedon, was an early Greek historian. The histories of Gorgias and Eudemus of Naxos both borrowed from him.

Maximus Tyrius speaks of a Melesagoras, a native of Eleusis, and Antigonus of Carystus of an Amelesagoras of Athens, the latter of whom wrote an account of Attica; these persons are probably the same, and perhaps also the same as Amelesagoras of Chalcedon.
