= Eriphus purpuratus =

Scientific classification
- Domain: Eukaryota
- Kingdom: Animalia
- Phylum: Arthropoda
- Class: Insecta
- Order: Coleoptera
- Suborder: Polyphaga
- Infraorder: Cucujiformia
- Family: Cerambycidae
- Genus: Eriphus
- Species: E. purpuratus

Binomial name
- Eriphus purpuratus Chevrolat, 1862

Species of beetle

Eriphus purpuratus is a species of beetle in the family Cerambycidae. It was described by Chevrolat in 1862.
