= Criton (disambiguation) =

Criton or Crito (Greek: Κρίτων) may refer to:

== Ancient world ==
- Crito, dialogue of Plato
- Crito of Alopece, follower of Socrates
- Criton, comic poet of the new comedy style
- Criton the Macedonian, Olympic winner in 328 BC
- Criton of Pieria, historian
- Criton of Aegae, Pythagorean philosopher
- Criton and Nicolaus of Athens, sculptors of the 1st century AD
- Criton of Heraclea in Caria (Titus Statilius Crito) (c. 100 AD), Greek chief physician and procurator of Trajan

== Modern world ==
- Crito, a pen-name of Charles Lamb
- Pascale Criton, French musicologist

- Criton, an ingredient present in Korean Soju (alcoholic beverage).
