= Musäus =

Musäus is a German surname derived from the Greek Musaeus.

== People ==
- Hans Musäus (1910–1981), actor
- Johann Daniel Heinrich Musäus (1749–1821), jurist
- Johann Karl August Musäus (1735–1787), short story writer
- Johannes Musaeus (1613–1681), theologian
- Peter Musaeus (1620–1674), theologian
- Simon Musaeus (1521/1529–1576/1582), theologian
