= Eriphus rubellus =

Scientific classification
- Domain: Eukaryota
- Kingdom: Animalia
- Phylum: Arthropoda
- Class: Insecta
- Order: Coleoptera
- Suborder: Polyphaga
- Infraorder: Cucujiformia
- Family: Cerambycidae
- Genus: Eriphus
- Species: E. rubellus

Binomial name
- Eriphus rubellus Martins & Galileo, 2004

Species of beetle

Eriphus rubellus is a species of beetle in the family Cerambycidae. It was described by Martins & Galileo in 2004.
