= Eriphus cardinalis =

Scientific classification
- Domain: Eukaryota
- Kingdom: Animalia
- Phylum: Arthropoda
- Class: Insecta
- Order: Coleoptera
- Suborder: Polyphaga
- Infraorder: Cucujiformia
- Family: Cerambycidae
- Genus: Eriphus
- Species: E. cardinalis

Binomial name
- Eriphus cardinalis Monné & Fragoso, 1996

Species of beetle

Eriphus cardinalis is a species of beetle in the family Cerambycidae. It was described by Monné & Fragoso in 1996.
