= Cephisodotus =

Cephisodotus may refer to:

- Cephisodotus (general), the Athenian general and statesman
- Cephisodotus the Elder, sculptor, the father of the sculptor Praxiteles
- Cephisodotus the Younger, sculptor, the son of the sculptor Praxiteles
