= Criton of Pieria =

2nd-century Greek historian

Criton of Pieria (Greek: Κρίτων Πιεριώτης, Πιερ(ι)εύς; Latin Crito Pieriota, Pieriotes, Pierius, Pierensis) was a 2nd-century Greek historian.

== Titles of works ==
- Παλληνικά, Pallenica, On Pallene
- Συρακουσῶν κτίσις, The Foundation of Syracuse
- Περσικά, Persica, On Persia
- Σικελικά, Siculica, On Sicily
- Συρακουσῶν περιήγησις, Description of Syracuse
- Περὶ τῆς ἀρχῆς τῶν Μακεδόνων, On the Empire of the Macedonians
