= Demetrius (son of Pythonax) =

Character in Greek mythology

Demetrius (Ancient Greek: Δημήτριος) son of Pythonax, surnamed Pheidon, was one of the Hetairoi of Alexander. In 327 BC, when the King attempted to introduce proskynesis, Demetrius is alleged to have alerted Alexander to Callisthenes' opposition. He is described as a flatterer of Alexander.
