= Deinias =

Ancient Greek writer

Deinias (Ancient Greek: Δεινίας) was an ancient Greek writer of the 4th century BC, and is possibly the person mentioned by Demosthenes as a skilled orator.
