= Artemon (physician) =

Ancient Roman physician of the 1st century CE

Artemon (Ancient Greek: Ἀρτέμων) was a physician of ancient Rome, who was said by Roman naturalist and author Pliny the Elder to have made use of cruel, unusual, superstitious remedies, that Pliny himself thought of more as "abominations" instead of actual cures.

For epilepsy, Artemon has prescribed water drawn from a spring in the night, and drunk from the skull of a man who has been slain, and whose body remains unburnt.

He must have lived some time in or before the first century CE.
