= Athenippus =

Ancient Greek physician

Athenippus (Ancient Greek: Ἀθήνιππος) was a physician of ancient Greece who must have lived some time in or before the first century CE, as one of his medical prescriptions is quoted by the 1st century CE physician Scribonius Largus.

He may perhaps be the same person, as the man of the same name mentioned in the writings of the physician Galen.
