= Thrasippus =

Thrasippus of Athens (Greek: Θράσιππος) was, in 348 BC, one of the six executors to Plato's will.

Thrasippus has been mentioned in Politics of Aristotle as having furnished a chorus to Ecphantides.
