= Architimus =

Ancient Greek writer

Architimus (Ancient Greek: Ἀρχίτιμος) was a writer of ancient Greece. His date is uncertain, but was some time before the 1st century CE. We know him to have written a work about the greek region Arcadia. There are no known records of his life.
