= Hippolus =

Ancient Greek mariner credited with the discovery of monsoon wind patterns

Hippolus is an ancient Greek mariner credited in Pliny the Elder's Periplus of the Erythyaean Sea with the discovery in 45 AD of the pattern of monsoon winds. These winds enabled ships to leave Ocelis near Aden in the spring and arrive at the west coast of south India in forty days. Then in the autumn the pattern of winds reversed allowing an equally speedy return from India. This resulted in a dramatic increase in trade between the Indian and the Greco-Roman world. This golden age of east-west sea trade lasted until Islamic expansion captured the ports in Egypt and the Ottoman Empire.
