= Peithias =

Peithias (Ancient Greek: Πειθίας), was a democratic leader of Corcyra during the Peloponnesian War.

In 427 BC he was killed together with "... sixty others, senators and private persons;..." This happened because Peithias was accused by Corcyraeans (in favor of Corinth) of enslaving Corcyra to Athens. Peithias won the charge and accused then five of the richest of his accusers "... of cutting stakes in the ground sacred to Zeus and Alcinous; ...", who then could not pay the fee. The oligarchic party fearing then Peithias "... to persuade the people to conclude a defensive and offensive alliance with Athens, ..." killed him then in the senate.
