= Musaeus (officer of Antiochus III) =

Musaeus (Ancient Greek: Μουσαῖος) was an officer of Antiochus III the Great, the ruler of the Seleucid Empire. Following his defeat in the Battle of Magnesia (190 BC), Antiochus III sent Musaeus to the triumphant Roman consuls (Scipio Asiaticus and Scipio Nasica), then stationed at Sardis to request their permission to start negotiating a peace treaty. According to Polybius Scipio Nasica received him courteously and granted him a safe passage back, with his consent to start negotiating a truce.

Polybius later mentions Musaeus as an emissary sent by Antiochus III to Gnaeus Manlius Vulso (consul in 189 BC), to discuss a truce with the Romans. Both incidents are also related by Livy, who only refers to Musaeus as "Antiochi legati." Appianus, similarly, mentions the events, but again does not mention Musaeus by name and refers to anonymous "Άντιόχου πρέσβεσι" (Antiochus' messengers or ambassadors)
