= Ameinocles =

8th-century BC Greek shipbuilder

- Αμεινοκλής
- Born: 8th century BC; Ancient Corinth
- Occupation: Shipbuilder

Ameinocles (Ancient Greek: Ἀμεινοκλῆς; fl. 8th century BCE ) was a Corinthian shipbuilder, who visited Samos about 704 BC, and built four ships for the Samians. Pliny the Elder says that Thucydides mentioned Ameinocles as the inventor of the trireme, but this is a mistake, for Thucydides merely states that triremes were first built at Corinth in Greece, without ascribing their invention to Ameinocles. According to Syncellus, however, triremes were first built at Athens by Ameinocles.
