= Philonides (physician) =

Philonides (Greek: Φιλωνίδης) was the name of two physicians in the time of Ancient Greece and Rome:

- A physician of Catana in Sicily, the tutor of Paccius Antiochus, who lived about the beginning of the 1st century. He is probably the physician who is quoted by Dioscorides, and said by him to have been a native of Enna in Sicily; by Erotianus; and also by Galen, who refers to his eighteenth book, Περὶ Ἰατρικῆς, De Medicina.
- A physician of Dyrrachium in Illyricum, who was a pupil of Asclepiades of Bithynia in the 1st century BC, practiced in his own country with some reputation, and wrote as many as 45 books.

One of these physicians wrote a work, Περὶ μύρων καὶ Στεφάνων, De Unguentis et Coronis, which is quoted by Athenaeus, and one on Pharmacy quoted by Andromachus, and by Marcellus Empiricus.
