= Moschion (tragic poet) =

Athenian poet active during the 3rd century BC

Moschion (Greek: Μοσχίων; 3rd century BC), was an Athenian tragic poet. Nothing is known about his life; he probably lived in the second half of the 3rd century BC. Three titles and a few fragments of his plays are preserved by Stobaeus. He wrote a Telephus, and two historical plays: Themistocles, of which we have a three-line fragment, and the Men of Pherae (Pheraioi), which dealt with the death of Jason, the cruel tyrant of Pherae. Also extant are 33 lines of a speech from an anonymous play that deals with the history of human progress. In this fragment, he states that humans originally lived like animals, without houses or technology, law was absent, and cannibalism was rife. Over time, agriculture, cooking, wine, houses, and cities were introduced, civilisation was born, and people buried their dead so that people would not be reminded of their earlier cannibalism.
