= Cleophon =

Cleophon or Kleophon may refer to:

- Cleophon, an Athenian politician of the late 5th century BCE
- Cleophon, an Athenian tragic poet of the 4th century BCE
- The so-called "Kleophon Painter", an anonymous Athenian vase painter of the mid-to-late 5th century BCE
