= Gryton =

Boeotian potter

Gryton (Ancient Greek: Γρύτων) was a Boeotian potter who worked in the first half of the 6th century BC. He is only known by his signature on the sole of a plastic aryballos in the shape of a sandal-clad foot, which is housed in the Museum of Fine Arts in Boston. A catalogue of his works was published by Raubitschek along with works of ancient Boeotian potters. These included the Ring Aryballos, which is part of a collection of Berlin's Staatliche Museen.

An interpretation of Rudolf Wachter based on the inscriptions of Boeotian vases also identified Gryton as a name derived from γρύτα, which meant container of ointments.
