= Creugas and Damoxenus =

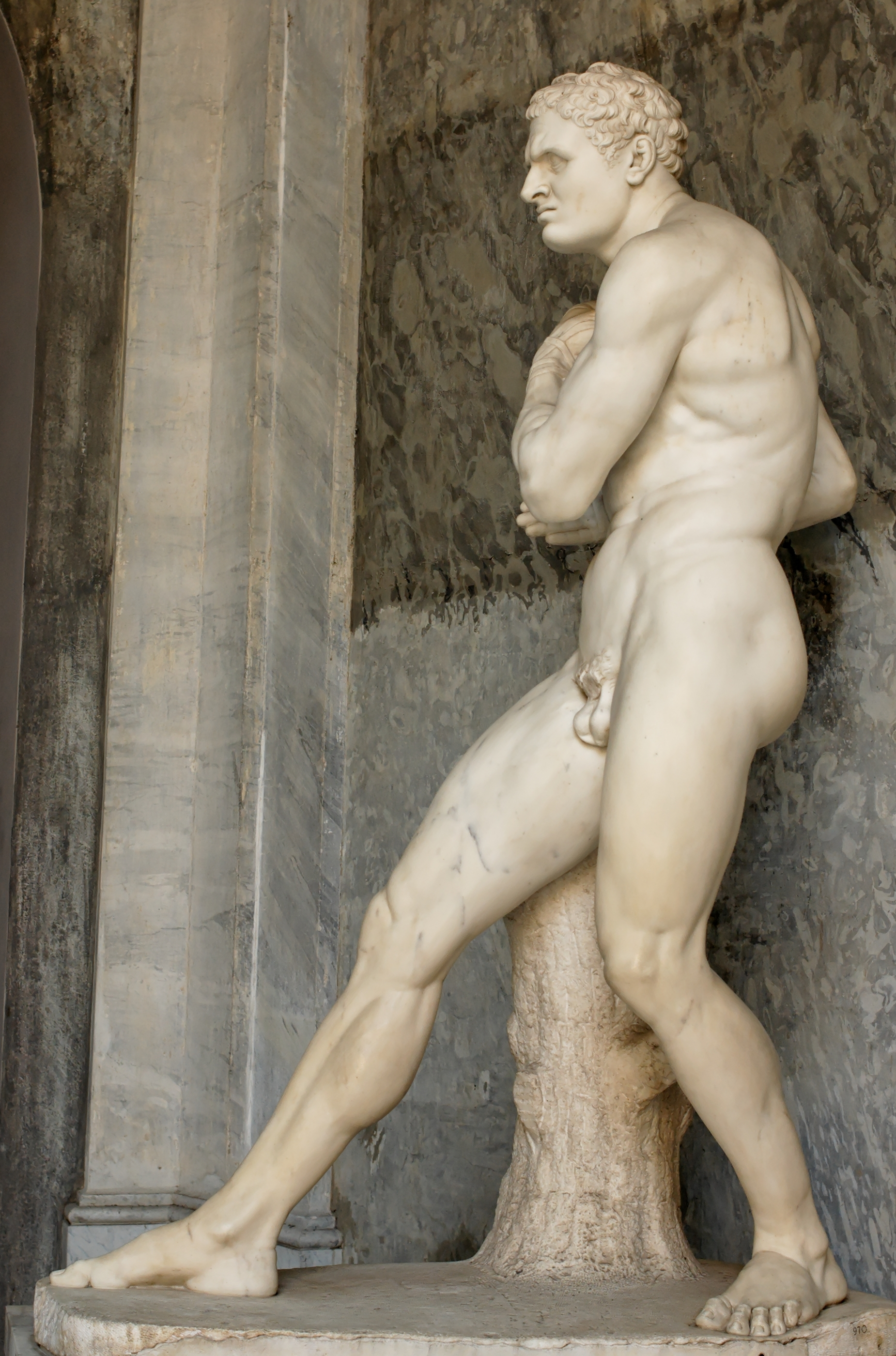
Damoxenos by Antonio Canova, ca. 1800.

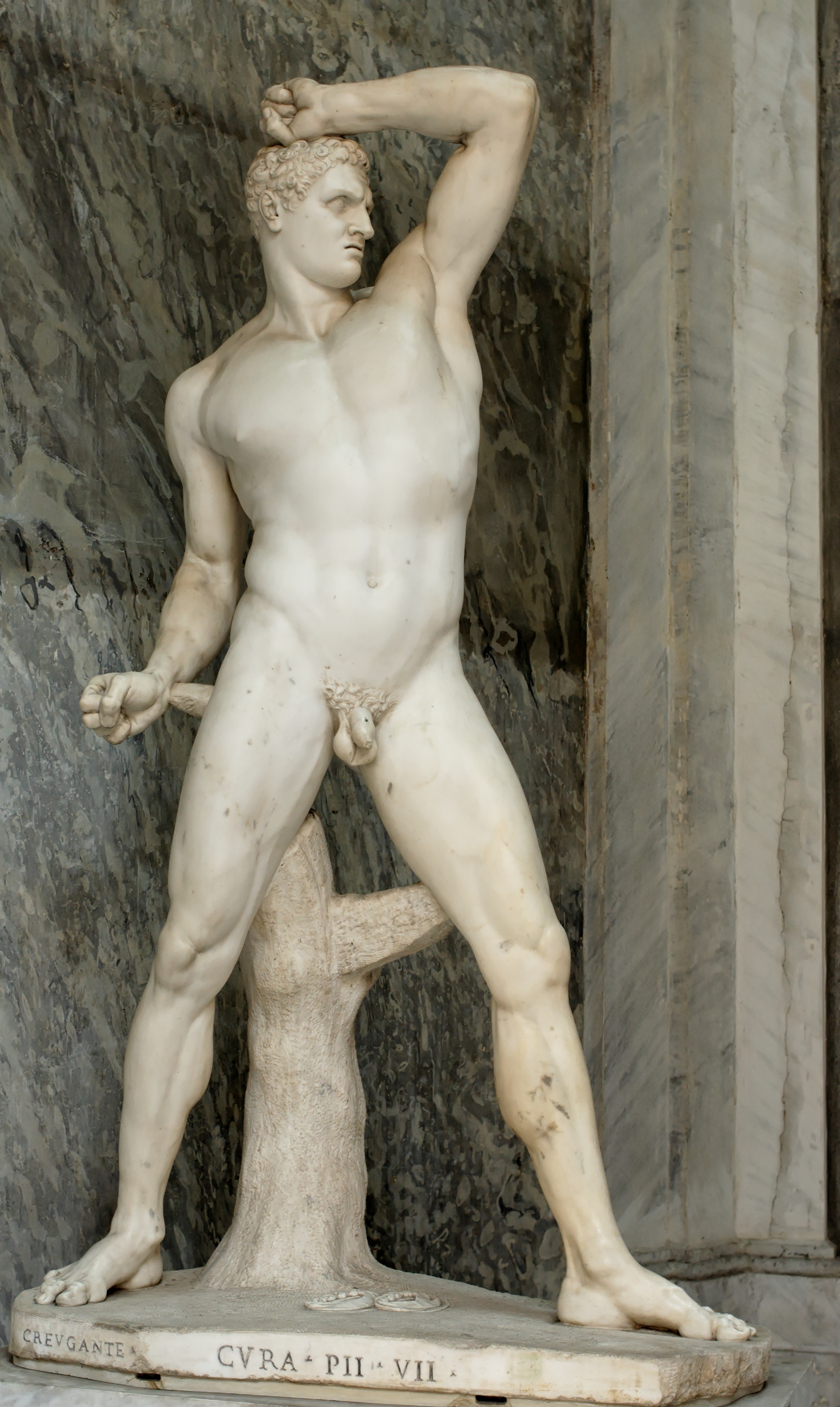
Creugas by Antonio Canova, ca. 1800.

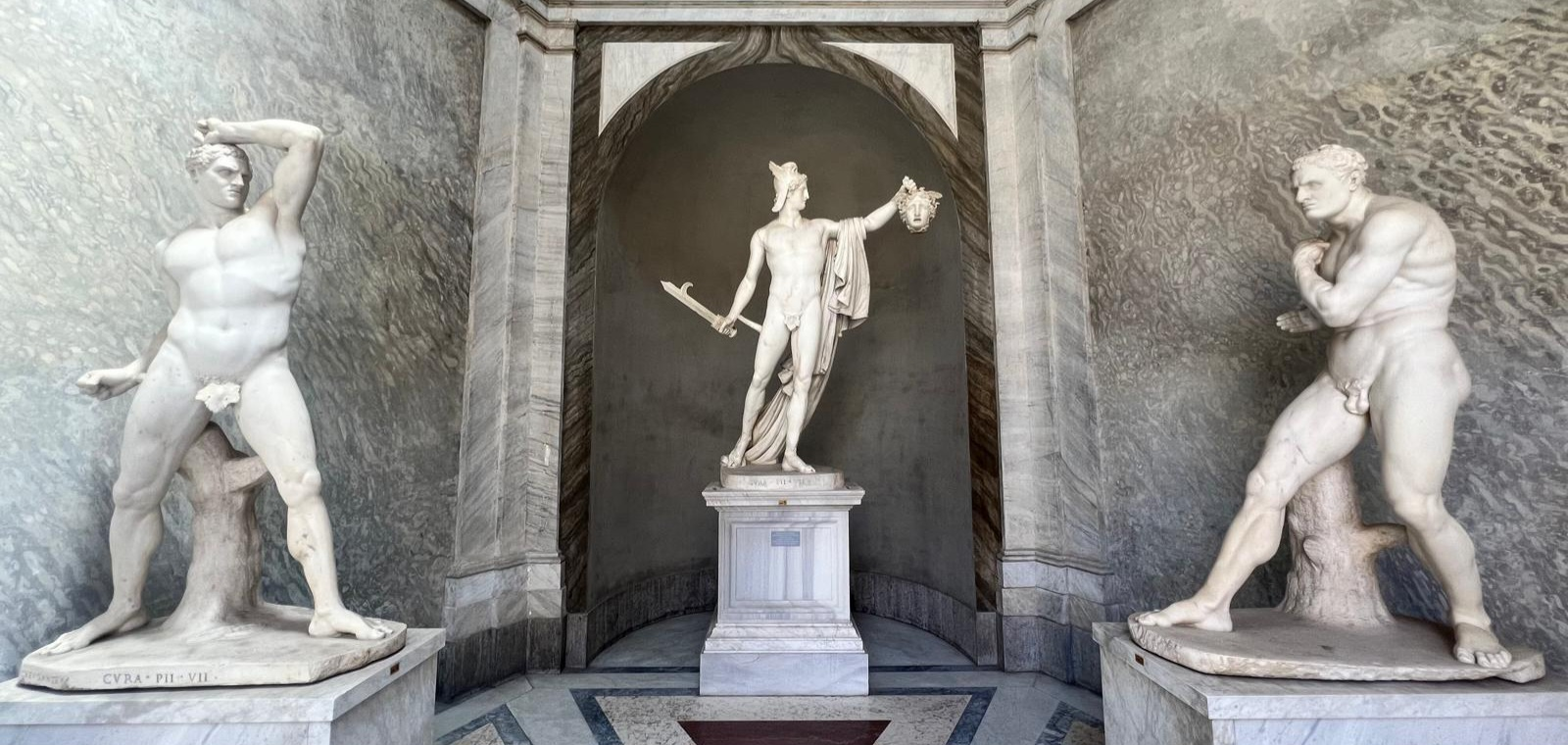
Creugas, Damoxenos and Perseus in Vatican Museums.

Creugas (Ancient Greek: Κρεύγας) of Epidamnus and Damoxenus (Ancient Greek: Δαμόξενος) of Syracuse were ancient Greek boxers.

Pausanias writes that during the Nemean games, as evening approached and their boxing match continued, they reached an agreement, audible to the witnesses around them, to take turns allowing each other to land a blow. Back then the boxers did not wear sharp thongs on their wrists but instead used soft gloves that were wrapped around the hollow of their hands, leaving their fingers exposed. These gloves were made from thin strips of raw ox-hide woven together.

Creugas attempted to strike Damoxenus in the head, but Damoxenus instructed Creugas to raise his arm. When Creugas complied, Damoxenus swiftly struck him under the ribs with his fingers extended. The combination of his sharp nails and the strength of the blow allowed him to penetrate Creugas's abdomen, grasp his intestines, and rip them out. Creugas died immediately, and the Argives removed Damoxenus for violating the agreement by striking his opponent multiple times instead of just once.

They awarded the victory to the deceased Creugas and erected a statue in his honor in Argos in the sanctuary of Lycian Apollo.

Antonio Canova's statues of Creugas and Damoxenus, positioned facing each other as he intended, are exhibited alongside his Perseus statue in the Vatican Museums.
