= Lysicles =

Lysicles may refer to:

- Lysicles (general, died 428 BC) (d. 428 BC), Athenian general, contemporary of Pericles
- Lysicles (general, died 338 BC) (d. 338 BC), Athenian commander at the battle of Chaeronea
- Lysicles (phasmid), a genus of stick insects in the family Phasmatidae
