= Thorax of Lacedaemonia =

Thorax (Ancient Greek: Θώραξ) of Lacedaemonia is mentioned by Diodorus Siculus as acting under Spartan commander Callicratidas during his operations in Lesbos in 405 BC, and as having been commissioned by him, after the capture of Mithymna, to conduct the heavy-armed troops to Mytilene. In the following year we again find Thorax in command of the land-force which cooperated with the fleet under Lysander in the storming of Lampsacus; and he was left at Samos as harmost by Lysander, when the latter was on his way to Athens after the Battle of Aegospotami in 404 BC. According to Plutarch, when the satrap Pharnabazus sent to Sparta to complain of ravages committed in his territory by Lysander, the Lacedaemonian government put Thorax to death, as he was a friend and colleague of the accused admiral, and they had found money in his possession. The date and circumstances of this, however, are very doubtful.
