= Timostratus =

Ancient Greek comic poet

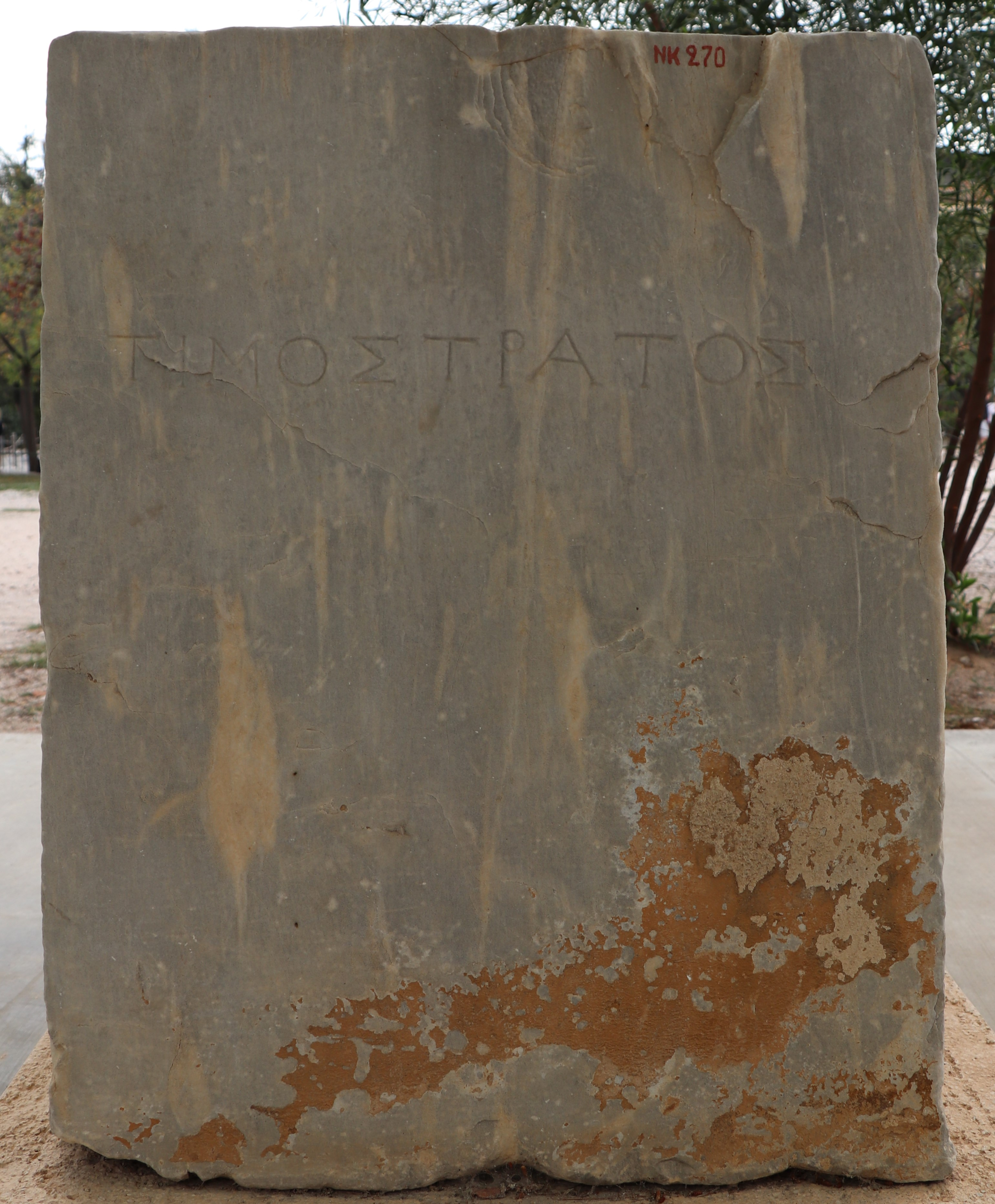
Statue base for Timostratus (IG II² 4267) in the Theatre of Dionysus.

Timostratus (Ancient Greek: Τιμόστρατος) was an Ancient Greek comic poet, who was active in the early second century BC. His son Ariston and his grandson Poses were also comic poets.

Inscriptions indicate that Timostratus came sixth in the Dionysia of 188 BC with the comedy The Ransomed Man (Ancient Greek: Λυτρούμενος, romanized: Lytrumenos) and came fourth in the Dionysia of 183 BC with Lover of his Relatives (Ancient Greek: Φιλοικεῖος, romanized: Philoikeios). It is unclear whether he was the author of The Reciprocal Benefactor (Ancient Greek: Ἀντευεργετῶν, romanized: Anteuergetōn), which came third in 177 BC. In addition, the ancient lexicographers transmit five further titles: The No-Hoper (Ancient Greek: Ἄσωτος, romanized: Asōtos), The Naturalised Citizen (Ancient Greek: Δημοποίητος, romanized: Dēmopoiētos), The Deposit (Ancient Greek: Παρακαταθήκη, romanized: Parakatathēkē), Pan (Πάν) und Lover of his Master (Ancient Greek: Φιλοδέσποτος, romanized: Philodespotos). John Stobaeus (4.50.13) quotes two lines from one of his works, dealing with the conflict between generations.

== Bibliography ==
- Rudolf Kassel, Colin Austin (ed.): Poetae Comici Graeci. Vol. 7. De Gruyter, Berlin/New York 1989, pp. 783–6.
- Alfred Körte: Timostratos 2.(in German) In: Realencyclopädie der classischen Altertumswissenschaft (RE). Vol. VI A,2, Stuttgart 1937, col. 1323.
- Heinz-Günther Nesselrath, "Timostratos 2" in Der Neue Pauly (DNP). 12/1, Metzler, Stuttgart 2002, ISBN 3-476-01482-7, Sp. 595.
