= Didymarchus =

Topics referred to by the same term

- Didymarchus (Greek: Διδύμαρχος) is mentioned by Antoninus Liberalis (23) as the author of a work on Metamorphoses, of which the third book is quoted there.
- Didymarchos, son of Apollonios, was a Macedonian of the fifth hipparchy in Kerkeosiris, a village in Ptolemaic Egypt.
