= Artemon (royal double) =

Ancient Syrian body double of Antiochus the Great in the 2nd century BCE

Artemon (Ancient Greek: Ἀρτέμων) was a Syrian man of reputedly royal descent, who lived in and after the reign of Antiochus III the Great.

Artemon resembled the king so much that when Antiochus was killed in 187 BCE, the queen Laodice III put Artemon into a bed, pretending that he was the king, and dangerously ill. Multiple people were admitted to see him; and all believed that they were listening to their king when he promoted the interests of Laodice and her children to them.
