= Acesias =

Ancient Greek physician

Acesias (Greek Ἀκεσίας) was an ancient Greek physician whose age and country are both unknown.

It is ascertained however that he lived at least as early as 4th century BC, as the proverb Ἀκεσίας ἰάσατο, "Acesias cured him", is quoted on the authority of Aristophanes. This saying (by which only Acesias is known to us) was used when any person's disease became worse instead of better under medical treatment, and is mentioned in the Suda, Zenobius, Diogenianus, Michael Apostolius, and Plutarch.

It is possible that an author bearing this name, and mentioned by Athenaeus as having written a treatise on the Art of Cooking (ὀψαρτυτικά), may be one and the same person, but of this we have no certain information.
