= Daphitas =

Greek grammarian

Daphitas (Ancient Greek: Δαφίτας) or Daphidas (Ancient Greek: Δαφίδας) of Telmessus was a Greek grammarian and epigrammatist known for his sharp and insulting manner of speech. He wrote against Homer, claiming that Homer lied in saying the Athenians fought at Troy. He was described as someone who reviled everyone indiscriminately and did not even spare the gods.

== Life ==
He attempted to mock the Delphic oracle by asking whether he would find his horse. The oracle answered that he would find it soon, and upon receiving this reply he declared that he had never had a horse, much less lost one.

== Death ==
On his return, King Attalus of Pergamum, provoked by Daphidas habit of reviling others, seized him and had him thrown from a cliff named "Hippus" (ἵππος; "horse") or which stood in a place called Hippus, thereby fulfilling the oracle's words.

Strabo records another tradition: that Daphidas was crucified on Mount Thorax (Θώραξ) near Magnesia after composing a distich that insulted the kings. Strabo also writes that an oracle had warned Daphitas to beware of the Thorax, thus presenting a wordplay involving the oracle and the manner of his death. In Greek, thorax mean "breastplate," making the warning resemble an admonition to put on a breastplate. The distich is also found in the Greek Anthology.

The distich according to Strabo was the below:

πορφύρεοι μώλωπες, ἀπορρινήματα γάζης Λυσιμάχου, Λυδῶν ἄρχετε καὶ Φρυγίης.

Purpled with stripes, mere filings of the treasure of Lysimachus, ye rule the Lydians and Phrygia.
