= Ambryon =

Ancient Greek writer

Ambryon (Ancient Greek: Ἀμβρύων) was an ancient Greek writer who wrote a work on the poet Theocritus, from which Diogenes Laërtius quotes an epigram of Theocritus against Aristotle. His date can only be fixed between the 3rd century BC and the 3rd century AD, and his work itself, On Theocritus, is no longer extant.

== See also ==
- Ancient Greek literature
