= Boukris =

Boukris or Boucris (Ancient Greek: Βοῦκρις) was an Aetolian pirate in the 3rd century BC who raided the Attic countryside and carried off slaves for sale to Crete. The incident is known from a Greek inscription where the Athenians honoured Eumaridas, a Cretan from Kydonia, for releasing the captives. Boukris might be the son of Daitas from Naupactus attested as a proxenos in Delos. Boukris was also a hieromnemon of the Aetolians in Delphi in the same century.
