= Alcisthene =

Ancient Greek female painter

Alcisthene or Alkisthene (Ancient Greek: Ἀλκισθένη) may have been a female painter mentioned by Pliny the Elder, in a list of notable female painters. In the Latin text, however, the name Alcisthenes seems to refer instead to a dancer (saltator) who is the subject of a painting by Irene daughter of the painter Cratinus.
