= Zeno of Rhodes =

Greek philosopher – 3rd Century BCE

Zeno of Rhodes (Ancient Greek: Ζήνων; born not later than 220 BC) was an ancient Greek politician and historian (FGrH 523).

Zeno mainly wrote about the history of Rhodes, and was a contemporary of Polybius. Polybius made extensive use of Zeno's historical work, especially on the dealings Rhodes had with Lycia and ancient Rome.
