= George Beardoe Grundy =

George Beardoe Grundy (10 January 1861, Wallasey – 6 December 1948, Oxford) was an English historian, specializing in the military history of ancient Greece and Rome.

Grundy was educated at Risley School and then at Lichfield Grammar School. He began teaching at age 16. At age 27 he matriculated at Brasenose College, Oxford, and received in 1892 the title of "Geographical Student of the University of Oxford", becoming a lecturer on ancient geography. He was from 1897 to 1903 a lecturer for professor of ancient history at Oxford, from 1903 to 1931 a fellow and tutor of ancient history at Corpus Christi College, Oxford, and from 1904 to 1917 a tutor in ancient history at Brasenose College, Oxford. He was in 1899 proxime accessit for the Arnold Historical Essay with a paper on Roman Dacia and in 1900 received the Conington Prize.

Before assuming his teaching duties in 1893 at Oxford in 1893, he had for a time served as an army tutor, and he remained a strong supporter of the military establishment and its values. Grundy was no less devoted to the Conservative party. ... Full of contempt for democracy, hatred of socialism, and admiration for aristocratic, military values, Grundy's major books, The Great Persian War and Its Preliminaries (1901) and Thucydides and the History of His Age (1911), attempted a fundamental revision of the nineteenth-century humanistic and radical interpretation of Athenian democracy.

Grundy's work helped to import late-19th century Prussian military studies of Greek phalanx warfare into Anglophone scholarship. However, "Grundy doesn't appear in citations nearly as much as his influence would imply; one is left to assume it is in part because he was a giant racist and no one is quite comfortable admitting that they are still using...his racism as the foundation for their assumptions."

== Selected publications ==
- The topography of the battle of Platea: The city of Platea. The field of Leuctra. Royal geographical society of London. [Publications]. London: J. Murray. 1894.
- The great Persian War and its preliminaries; a study of the evidence, literary and topographical. London: J. Murray. 1901.
- Thucydides and the history of his age. London: J. Murray. 1911.
- History of the Greek and Roman world. With two maps. London: Methuen. 1926.
- Saxon charters of Worcestershire. Birmingham: Birmingham Archaeological Society. 1931.
- Saxon Oxfordshire: charters and ancient highways. Oxford: Oxfordshire Record Society. 1933.
- Saxon charters and field names of Somerset. Taunton: Somersetshire Archaeological and Natural History Society. 1935.
- Fifty-years at Oxford: an unconventional autobiography. London: Methuen. 1945.
