= Alexandrides =

Ancient Greek historian

Alexandrides (Ancient Greek: Ἀλεξανδρίδης) of Delphi was an ancient Greek historian of uncertain date. If we may judge from the subjects on which his history is quoted as an authority, it would seem that his work was a history of Delphi.
