= Callippides =

Ancient Greek runner in a proverb

Callippides (Καλλιππίδης) or Callippos (Κάλλιππος) was apparently an ancient Greek runner, who gave his name to a proverb for those making great efforts but no progress.

== Instances ==
In 45 BC, Cicero complains in a letter to Atticus that Varro had promised to dedicate a work to him but "Two years have gone by while that Callippides has been running all the time without advancing one cubit." The Roman Emperor Tiberius was said to have made preparations almost yearly for a visit to the provinces and the armies stationed there, which he always cancelled at the last minute, with the result that "he was jokingly referred to as Callippides, who was known in the Greek proverb to run and make not a cubit of progress". The proverb is found with this definition in a Greek proverb collection, but with the name Callippos.

== Interpretation ==
The proverb scholar August Otto writes that Callippos was apparently a runner who despite all his efforts never reached the finish. Otto suggests that since Callipides is the patronymic of Callippos, it can mean "another Callippos", so that the original name would be Callippos, as in the Greek collection, rather than Callipides. Others suggest emending the Greek text to Callippides to agree with the references in Cicero and Suetonius. Some have seen in him not a runner, but the famous fifth century actor Callippides.

== Literature ==
- E. Leutsch (ed.) Corpus Paroemiographorum Graecorum (Göttingen, 1851)
- A. Otto Die Sprichwörter und sprichwörtlichen Redensarten der Römer (Leipzig: Teubner, 1890)
