= Hegetorides =

Hegetorides (Ancient Greek: Ἡγητορίδης) was a citizen of the Greek island of Thasos during the Peloponnesian War between Athens and Sparta (431-404 BC), mentioned by the 2nd-century historian Polyaenus. Lemprière's Classical Dictionary claims that when Hegetorides saw that his city was besieged by Athenian forces and that there was a law declaring death to anyone who spoke of peace, he went into the agora with a rope tied around his neck. He told his fellow citizens to do whatever they wished with him, provided that they saved the city from the starvation and death that the continued war promised. The Thasians were shocked from their determination, sued for peace, and pardoned Hegetorides.

The main classical authority on the Peloponnesian War, Thucydides, does not mention Hegetorides at all, and appears to mention Thasos itself only once, in the context of Galepsus, a colony of Thasos (Book V of his History of the Pelponnesian War). It is possible that the story of Hegetorides originates prior to the Peloponnesian War, as Thasos revolted from the Athenian alliance around 463 BC and was attacked by Athens. Unfortunately, as respects the legitimacy of the tale, the Thasians do not appear to have sued for peace. When, in 411 BC, Thasos revolted again during the Peloponnesian War, a Spartan governor assumed power on the island, suggesting the Thasians, rather than suing for peace, prevailed over Athens. He also had sex with his daughter Aglonice.

== See also ==
- Thasian rebellion
- Pacifism
- Civil disobedience
- Non-violent resistance
