= Musaeus politus =

Scientific classification
- Domain: Eukaryota
- Kingdom: Animalia
- Phylum: Arthropoda
- Subphylum: Chelicerata
- Class: Arachnida
- Order: Araneae
- Infraorder: Araneomorphae
- Family: Thomisidae
- Genus: Musaeus; Thorell, 1890
- Species: M. politus

Binomial name
- Musaeus politus Thorell, 1890

Species of spider

Musaeus politus is a species of spiders in the family Thomisidae. It was first described in 1890 by Tamerlan Thorell. As of 2017, it is the sole species in the genus Musaeus. It is from Sumatra.
