= Aristolycus of Athens =

Aristolycus of Athens (in Ancient Greek, Αριστόλυκος) or Aristolochos (in Ancient Greek, Αριστόλοχος) of Athens, is listed as a victor in the stadion race of the 109th Olympiad (344 BC).
