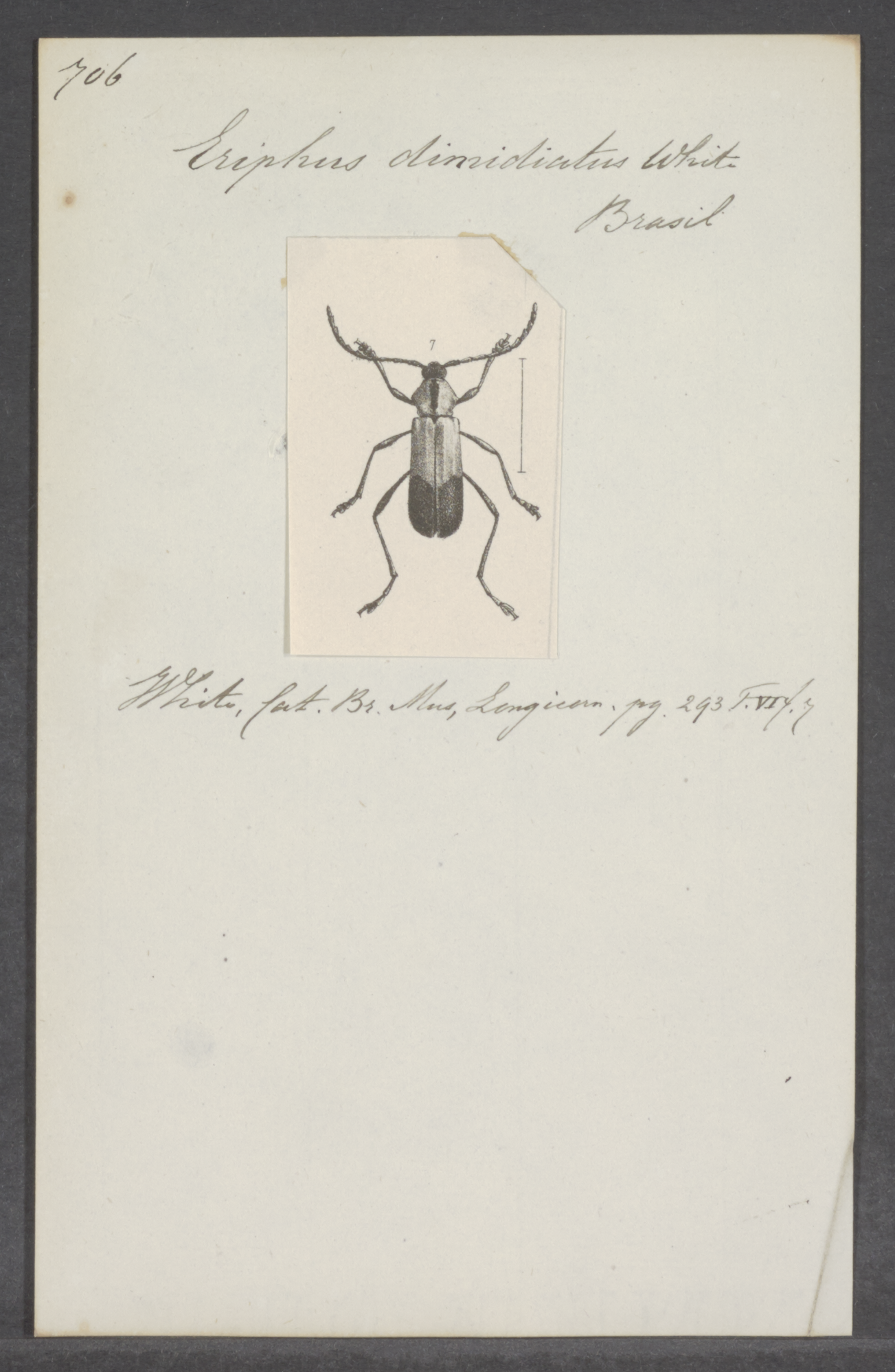
- Eriphus - Print - Iconographia Zoologica - Special Collections University of Amsterdam - UBAINV0274 033 26 0013

Scientific classification
- Domain: Eukaryota
- Kingdom: Animalia
- Phylum: Arthropoda
- Class: Insecta
- Order: Coleoptera
- Suborder: Polyphaga
- Infraorder: Cucujiformia
- Family: Cerambycidae
- Subfamily: Cerambycinae
- Tribe: Trachyderini
- Genus: Eriphus; Audinet-Serville, 1834

= Eriphus =

Genus of beetles

Eriphus is a genus of beetles in the family Cerambycidae, containing the following species:

- Eriphus bahiensis Chevrolat, 1862
- Eriphus bisignatus (Germar, 1824)
- Eriphus cardinalis Monné & Fragoso, 1996
- Eriphus clarkei Tippmann, 1960
- Eriphus dimidiatus White, 1855
- Eriphus haematoderus Chevrolat, 1862
- Eriphus immaculicollis Audinet-Serville, 1834
- Eriphus lineatocollis Chevrolat, 1862
- Eriphus longicollis Zajciw, 1961
- Eriphus metallicus Zajciw, 1960
- Eriphus mexicanus Audinet-Serville, 1834
- Eriphus prolixus Bates, 1872
- Eriphus purpuratus Chevrolat, 1862
- Eriphus rubellus Martins & Galileo, 2004
- Eriphus smaragdinus Monné & Fragoso, 1996
- Eriphus variegatus Monné & Fragoso, 1996
- Eriphus viridis Monné & Fragoso, 1996
