= Hagnodorus =

Hagnodorus of Amphitrope (Greek: Ἁγνόδωρος) was the brother-in-law of Critias (460–403 BC), the ancient Athenian political figure and author. Both were associated with the Thirty Tyrants of Athens.
