= Artemon of Pergamon =

Ancient Greek writer of the 2nd century BCE

Artemon (Ancient Greek: Ἀρτέμων) of Pergamon was a rhetorician of ancient Greece, a grammarian and writer who wrote a history of Sicily, which is now lost. We know of him primarily from his frequent mentions by ancient grammarians, especially the scholiasts on the lyric poet Pindar, about whom Artemon also wrote commentaries.

He was said in some works to have been a student of the grammarian and stoic philosopher Crates of Mallus. As with many writers of his name, he is frequently confounded with other authors of his rough time period who produced works in various genres, such as Artemon of Cassandreia.
