= Stypax of Cyprus =

Stypax (or Styppax or Stipax or Stippax) of Cyprus, was an ancient sculptor whose reputation, according to Pliny the Elder, rested on a single celebrated work. This statue, known as the Splanchnoptes (σπλαγχνόπτης; "the roaster of entrails/Man cooking entrails"), represented a slave of Pericles engaged in a sacrificial task, roasting the entrails of the victim and kindling the fire by blowing upon it with his breath.

Pliny associates the figure in the statue with a story concerning a slave of Pericles who fell from the summit of the Parthenon and was healed by the use of a herb revealed to Pericles by Athena in a dream, though Plutarch tells a similar story of the architect Mnesicles.

Modern researchers have suggested that fragments discovered on the Athenian Acropolis may have belonged to the base of the Splanchnoptes. It has also been proposed that the name "Stypax" as preserved in Pliny's text may be a corruption of another name, possibly Strabax. These scholarly conjectures remain uncertain and subject to debate.
