= Damatria (Spartan) =

Damatria was a Spartan woman who, according to the 1st-century CE author Plutarch, murdered her son Damatrius when he returned home, for she had heard that he had been a coward in battle. This story is also recounted in an epigram of The Greek Anthology authored by Tymnes, wherein it is stated that she murdered her son for violating the law in some manner, and that she said to him "Perish, craven whelp, evil piece, to Hell with thee! He who is not worthy of Sparta is not my son."
