= Sosicles (poet) =

Ancient Greek tragic poet

Sosicles was mentioned by Fabricius, on the authority of the Suda and Eudocia, as a tragic poet of the time of Philip and Alexander the Great. It appears, however, from the best manuscripts of the Suda, that the name is erroneously introduced, owing to the text of Suidas being misread by some of his copyists, as well as by Eudocia. According to the true reading of Suidas, Sosicles is simply mentioned as the father of the tragic poet Sosiphanes. (Suda, under "Sosiphanes", ed. Kuster; Eudoc. p. 384; Westermann, Vitarum Script. Graec. Min. p. 152, n. 65; Fabricius, Bibl. Graec. vol. ii. p. 322.)
