= Diotogenes =

Ancient Greek Pythagorean philosopher

- Διωτογένης
- Era: Ancient philosophy
- Region: Ancient Greek philosophy
- School: Neopythagoreanism
- Language: Doric Greek
- Main interests: Political philosophy

Diotogenes (Ancient Greek: Διωτογένης) was a Neopythagorean philosopher. He wrote a work On Piety, (Note: Ancient Greek: πεπὶ ὁσιότητος) of which three fragments are preserved in Stobaeus, and another On Kingship, (Note: Ancient Greek: πεπι βασιλείας) of which two considerable fragments are likewise extant in Stobaeus.

The details of Diotogenes' life are unknown, and even his name is uncertain, as the name "Diotogenes" is otherwise unattested. On the basis of the content and the style of the preserved fragments, he is generally considered to have lived some time between the 3rd century BCE and the 2nd century CE, with most estimates falling between the 1st centuries BCE and CE.

In On Piety, Diotogenes outlines ethical rules, placing a particular stress on the need for a good education, and in On Kingship, he argues that kings should follow the rule of law, compares the role of a king to a god (Zeus), and discusses various qualities of a good king.
