= Agathotychus =

Ancient Greek veterinary and writer

Agathotychus (Ancient Greek: Ἀγαθότυχος) was an ancient veterinary surgeon, whose date and history are unknown, but who probably lived in the 4th or 5th century AD. Some fragments of his writings are to be found in the collection of works on this subject first published in a Latin translation by Joseph Ruellius, Veterinariae Medicinae Libri duo.
