= Amentes =

Ancient Greek physician

Amentes (Ancient Greek: Ἀμήντης) was an ancient Greek surgeon, mentioned by Galen as the inventor of some ingenious bandages. Some fragments of the works of a surgeon named Amynias (of which name Amentes is very possibly a corruption) still exist in the manuscript "Collection of Surgical Writers" by Nicetas, and one extract is preserved by Oribasius in the fourth volume of Angelo Mai's collection Classici Auctores e Vaticanis Codicibus. His date is unknown, except that he must have lived in or before the 2nd century AD. He may perhaps be the same person who is said by the Scholiast on Theocritus to have been put to death by Ptolemy II Philadelphus, around 264 BC, for plotting against his life.
