= Agroetas =

Ancient Greek historian

Agroetas (Ancient Greek: Ἀγροίτας) was an ancient Greek historian who wrote a work on Scythia (Σκυθικά), from the thirteenth book of which the scholiast on Apollonius of Rhodes quotes, and one on Libya (Λιβυκά), the fourth book of which is quoted by the same scholiast. He is also mentioned by Stephanus of Byzantium. He is one of the authors (= FGrHist 762) whose fragments were collected in Felix Jacoby's Die Fragmente der griechischen Historiker.

Agroetas is also the name of a Roman rhetorician mentioned by the elder Seneca, but about whom nothing more is known.
