= Gyrtias =

- Γυρτιάς
- Era: Classical antiquity
- Relatives: Acrotatus

Gyrtias (Ancient Greek: Γυρτιάς, Gurtiás) was a Spartan noblewoman who is recorded by Plutarch in the text Sayings of Spartan Women. When her grandson, the future king Acrotatus, returned home injured from a fight, she stated that the boy had shown the valor of his bloodline and also admonished the friends and family for wailing instead of seeking to help. The classicist Frank Cole Babbitt suggests that Plutarch may have borrowed this idea from Plato, who in his Republic writes "grief gets in the way of what must come to our aid as soon as possible in those circumstances." According to Plutarch, a messenger from Crete later told Gyrtias news of the death of Acrotatus, to which she replied that she was pleased, for she preferred him to die a death worthy of herself, her country, and her ancestors than to live life as a coward. However, Acrotatus had in truth died in Megalopolis; Plutarch may have been confused by the wars of his father Areus I in Crete.
