= Epaphroditus of Chaeronea =

Greek grammarian

- Died: 95 AD; Rome
- Occupations: Scholar; Librarian; Poet

Epaphroditus of Chaeronea was a Greek speaking grammarian who lived in Rome during the era of emperor Nerva.

Although born into slavery, he was later freed and became an acclaimed writer and collector of books on grammar, language and various other subjects.

== Life ==
He was born in Chaeronea, Greece.

=== Later life ===
He died in the reign of Emperor Nerva at the age of 75.
