= Sosicles (statesman) =

Sosicles was a Corinthian ambassador at the remarkable meeting of the allies of Sparta at around 500 BC, before which the Spartans laid their proposal for restoring Hippias to the tyranny of Athens. Sosicles remonstrated with indignant vehemence against the measure, and set forth the evils which Corinth had endured under the successive tyrannies of Cypselus and Periander. His appeal was successful with the allies, and the project was abandoned.

Herodotus records the speech (Herod, v. 92, 93.; bk6 chs312-315). His record of it is probably not authentic as the meeting was secret and no Athenian could have heard. What is more likely is Herodotus using Sosicles to give an extended speech on the fault of tyranny and also to give a digression into Corinth's history.
