= Artemon of Magnesia =

Ancient Greek writer on the virtues of women, of unknown time

Artemon (Ancient Greek: Ἀρτέμων) of Magnesia was a writer of ancient Greece known only as the author of a work on the virtues of women, the title of which is generally translated as Accounts of Deeds Done Courageously by Women (περὶ τῶν κατ' ἀρὴτν γυναιξὶ πεπραγματευμένων), but also sometimes Tales of Feminine Virtue or Stories of the Virtuous Exploits of Women.

We know from later authors that the 4th-century Sophist Sopater of Apamea made an abstract of this work; both the original and the abstract are lost. Our knowledge of Artemon comes almost exclusively from one reference in the Bibliotheca of Photios I of Constantinople, in which he describes Sopater's abstract. Some scholars have suggested this work is one of the sources of the (still extant) anonymous work Women Intelligent and Courageous in Warfare.

Later scholars have used the existence of this Artemon's work, as well as that of a few others, and some comments by, for example, Plutarch in his Gaius Marius, implying that it would be cliche for him to rehash "overdone" stories of women's accomplishments, that such books were at least somewhat commonplace in ancient Greece. Other scholars point out that we should not assume that Artemon's and related works uniformly portrayed their subjects in a positive light based on modern assumptions about what these titles would signify, as authors of this period were fascinated by paradoxography, and books praising subjects generally assumed to be not praiseworthy were themselves not uncommon.
