= Artemon (rhetorician) =

Ancient Greek writer of the 2nd century BCE

Artemon (Ancient Greek: Ἀρτέμων) was a rhetorician of ancient Greece who seems to have lived during the early period of the Roman Empire. It is said that he lived during the reign of either Augustus or Tiberius. His works are mentioned several times by Seneca the Elder who has also preserved some fragments of his. Some of his theories on composition were also refuted by other rhetoricians such as Demetrius. Artemon, who edited some of Aristotle's correspondence, believed that a letter should be written like one side of a dialogue." Demetrius recommended a simpler format, devoid of interruptions and didactic style.
