= Musaeus of Ephesus =

Musaeus of Ephesus (Ancient Greek: Μουσαῖος ὁ Ἐφέσιος) was an Ephesian epic poet attached to the court of the kings of Pergamon, who wrote a Perseis in ten books and also poems about Eumenes and Attalus I.
