= Artemon of Cassandreia =

Ancient Macedonian grammarian in the 4th century BCE

Artemon (Ancient Greek: Ἀρτέμων) of Cassandreia was an ancient Macedonian grammarian, who seems to have lived after 316 BCE.

He is mentioned by Athenaeus as the author of the following works:

1. Περὶ συναγωγῆς (or, according to others, ἀναγωγῆς) Βιβλίων, which would either be on collecting books, or on assigning books to their proper authors.

2. Περὶ Βιβλίων χρήσεως, or Περὶ χρήσεως τῶν περὶ τὰς συνουσίας ᾀδομένων.

He is perhaps the same as the author of a work περὶ Διονυσιακοῦ συστήματος, also quoted by Athenaeus, without any distinguishing epithet.

There is also a work on painters (περὶ ζωγράφων) which is ascribed to an Artemon, who may be the same author. The classical scholar Johann Albert Fabricius was inclined to believe that Artemon of Cassandreia is the one of whom Demetrius speaks as the person who collected letters of Aristotle.
