= Artemon (sculptor) =

Ancient Greek sculptor

Artemon (Ancient Greek: Ἀρτέμων) was a sculptor of ancient Greece who worked in Rome in the first century CE. In conjunction with Pythodorus, he made statues that adorned the palaces of the Caesars on the Palatine Hill.
