= Antigonus of Carystus =

Antigonus of Carystus (/ænˈtɪɡənəs/; Ancient Greek: Ἀντίγονος ὁ Καρύστιος; Latin: Antigonus Carystius), a Greek writer on various subjects, flourished in the 3rd century BCE. After some time spent at Athens and travelling, he was summoned to the court of Attalus I (241 BCE–197 BCE) of Pergamum. His chief work is the Successions of Philosophers drawn from personal knowledge, with considerable fragments preserved in Athenaeus and Diogenes Laërtius. His work Ἱστοριῶν παραδόξων συναγωγή (Historiae Mirabiles, "Collection of Wonderful Tales"), a paradoxographical work chiefly extracted from the Περὶ θαυμασίων ἀκουσμάτων (On Marvellous Things Heard) attributed to Aristotle and the Θαυμάσια ("Thaumasia") of Callimachus, survived to modernity. It is doubtful whether he is identical to the sculptor who, according to Pliny (Nat. Hist. xxxiv. 19), wrote books on his art.
