= Epigenes, son of Antiphon =

Disciple of Socrates

Epigenes (Epigetês), son of Antiphon, of the deme of Cephisia, is mentioned by Plato among the disciples of Socrates, who were with him in his last moments. Xenophon represents Socrates as remonstrating with him on his neglect of the bodily exercises requisite for health and strength.
