= Timasitheus of Trapezus =

Timasitheus or Timesitheus (Gr. Τιμασίθεος or Τιμησίθεος, fl. 4th century BC) was a citizen of Trapezus, and a proxenus of the Mossynoeci, between whom and the Cyrean Greeks he acted as interpreter, when the latter wished to make a treaty with the barbarians, and to obtain a passage through their country.
