= Artemon of Clazomenae =

Ancient Greek writer of unknown time

Artemon of Clazomenae (Ancient Greek: Ἀρτέμων ὁ Κλαζομένιος) was an annalist mentioned by the Roman writer Claudius Aelianus as the author of a work called Clazomenaean Terms (ὅροι Κλαζομυένιοι), in which he mentioned that, at one time, the territory of Clazomenae was ravaged by a winged sow.

The author of the Suda ascribes to him a work called On Homer (περὶ Ὁμήρου), of which, however, not a trace is now extant.

Regarding his time we know only that he must have lived in or before the 2nd century CE. He perhaps wrote in pre-Hellenistic times.

The writer Servius the Grammarian in his commentaries on Virgil's Aeneid confuses this Artemon with the engineer of the same name. This confusion persists to the present day, and many writers still refer to the Spartan engineer as "Artemon of Clazomenae".
