= Boethus of Sidon (Stoic) =

Stoic philosopher from Sidon, 200 BCE

Boethus (Ancient Greek: Βοηθός; fl. 2nd century BC) was a Stoic philosopher from Sidon, and a pupil of Diogenes of Babylon.

== Philosophy ==
He is said to have denied, contrary to the standard Stoic view, that the cosmos is an animate being, and he suggested that it was not the whole world which was divine, but only the ether or sphere of the fixed stars. He argued that the world was eternal, in particular, he rejected the Stoic conflagration (ekpyrosis) because god or the World-Soul would be inactive during it, whereas it exercises Divine Providence in the actual world.

Among his works was one On Nature, and one On Fate. He wrote a commentary on the works of Aratus in at least four volumes.
