= Artemon (engineer) =

Ancient Greek builder of siege engines in the 5th century BCE

Artemon (Ancient Greek: Ἀρτέμων) was a Spartan engineer who built the military engines for Pericles in his war against Samos in 441 BCE.

There was a celebrated statue of this Artemon made by Polycletus.

The writer Servius the Grammarian in his commentaries on Virgil's Aeneid confuses this Artemon with the writer Artemon of Clazomenae. This confusion persists to the present day, and many writers will still call him "Artemon of Clazomenae".
