= Demetrius of Magnesia =

Greek grammarian and biographer

Demetrius of Magnesia (Ancient Greek: Δημήτριος; 1st century BC) was a Greek grammarian and biographer, and a contemporary of Cicero and Atticus. He had, in Cicero's recollection, sent Atticus a work of his on concord, (Greek: Περὶ ὁμονοίας), which Cicero also was anxious to read. A second work of his, which is often referred to, was of an historical and philological nature, and treated of poets and other authors who bore the same name (Greek: Περὶ ὁμωνύμων ποιητῶν καὶ συγγραφέων). This important work, to judge from what is quoted from it, contained the lives of the persons, and a critical examination of their merits. For example, Demetrius is cited by Diogenes Laertius as a key source in his biography of the historian Xenophon, providing information about Xenophon that would otherwise be unknown.
