= Artemon (painter) =

Ancient Greek painter (active c. 300 BC)

Artemon (Ancient Greek: Ἀρτέμων), a Greek painter, who is recorded by Pliny to have painted a picture of Queen Stratonice, from which it is presumed that he lived about B.C. 300. He also painted 'Hercules and Deianira;' but his most celebrated works were the pictures which were carried to Rome, and placed in the Octavian Portico, representing 'Hercules received amongst the Gods;' and the 'History of Laomedon with Apollo and Neptune.'
