= Callisthenes (Seleucid) =

Character in 2 Maccabees

Callisthenes (/kəˈlɪsθəˌniːz/; Koinē Greek: Καλλισθένης, Kallisthenēs) was a Syrian who was believed to have been involved in the burning of the gates of the Second Temple during the persecution to which the Jews were subjected in the reign of Antiochus Epiphanes. When the Jews were celebrating their subsequent victory over Nicanor (135 BC), they captured Callisthenes, who had taken refuge in a little house, and burned him to death. "And so he received a reward meet for his wickedness" (2 Maccabees 8:33). Callisthenes is mentioned in 2 Maccabees, which is part of the Catholic deuterocanon, and considered non-canonical by Protestants.
