= Antidorus of Cyme =

Antidorus (Ancient Greek: Ἀντίδωρος) of Cyme or Cumae was a Greek grammarian. He influenced Eratosthenes, chief librarian at the Library of Alexandria. He played a role in the development of the science of grammar, which emerged during his time as a noted grammarian between 340–330 BC. Thus he lived in the time of Alexander the Great.

== Various definitions of grammar ==
In Ancient Greece, the term γραμματική (grammar) had many meanings that evolved over time:

- The term ″grammarian″ as understood in the earlier classical sense: knowledge of the letters of the alphabet (this being the common meaning) and the number of alphabets known; thus implying a person knowing how to read.
- As understanding developed, the term was used for a teacher of reading. Theagenes of Rhegium (floruit 550 BC) was the earliest allegorical interpreter of Homer, and thus perhaps the first person to have the term γραμματική acceptably applied.
- During the Alexandrian age, it meant "a student of literature, especially of poetry".

== Arguments ==
According to a tradition, the first person to have a developed designation of γραμματικός applied to his activities, ergo himself was a pupil of Theophrastus, the philosopher of the peripatetic school of Praxiphanes of Rhodes, active and flourishing about 300 BC, although another tradition suggests that Antidorus might instead have been the first γραμματικός.

They say that Antidorus of Chyme was the first person to call himself a grammarian; he wrote a treatise about Homer and Hesiod

== See also ==
- Cyme
- Dionysius Thrax
