= Epigenes of Sicyon =

Ancient Greek tragic poet

Epigenes of Sicyon (Ancient Greek: Ἐπιγένης ὁ Σικυώνιος) was an Ancient Greek tragic poet. He has been confounded by some with his namesake, the comic poet.

He is mentioned by Suidas as the most ancient writer of tragedy. By the word "tragedy" here we can understand only the old dithyrambic and satyrical tragôidia, into which it is possible that Epigenes may have been the first to introduce other subjects than the original one of the fortunes of origin, if at least we may trust the account which we find in Apostolius, Photius, and Suidas, of the origin of the proverb ouden pros ton Dtonuson. This would clearly be one of the earliest steps in the gradual transformation of the old dithyrambic performance into the dramatic tragedy of later times, and may tend to justify the statement which ascribes the invention of tragedy to the Sicyonians.

The period at which Epigenes flourished is unknown, and the point was a doubtful one in the time of Suidas, who says that, according to some, he was the 16th before Thespis, while, according to others, he almost immediately preceded him.
