= Lyceum (classical) =

Public meeting place in Classical Athens

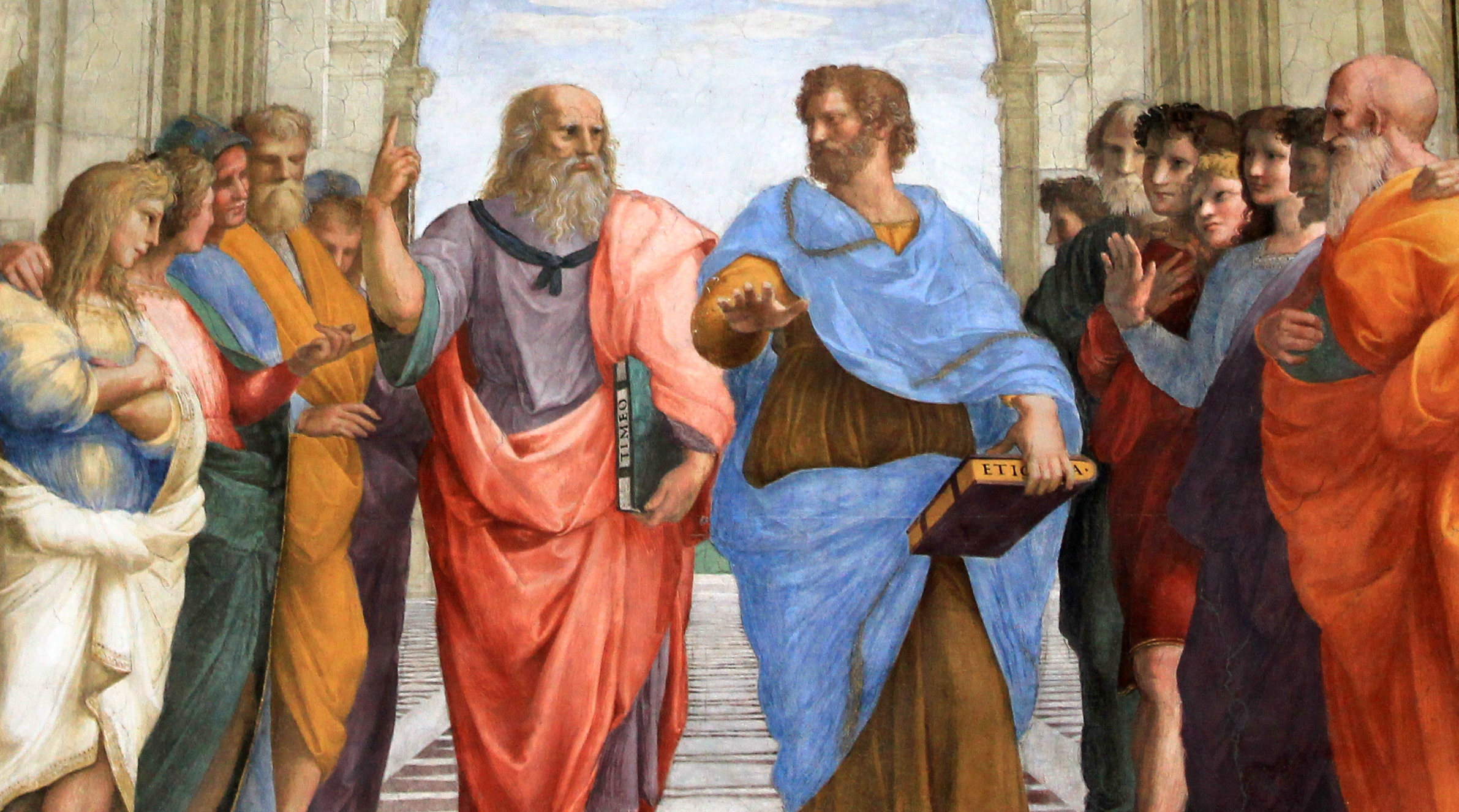
Plato and Aristotle walking and disputing. Detail from Raphael's The School of Athens (1509–1511)

The Lyceum (/ˌlaɪˈsiːəm/, Ancient Greek: Λύκειον, romanized: Lykeion /lý.keː.on/) was a temple in Athens dedicated to Apollo.

It was best known for the Peripatetic school of philosophy founded there by Aristotle in 334 BC. Aristotle fled Athens in 323 BC, and the school continued to function after his lifetime under a series of leaders until the Roman general Sulla destroyed it during his assault on Athens in 86 BC.

The remains of the Lyceum are now in a park in modern Athens; they were discovered in 1996.

== The Lyceum ==
The Lyceum had been used for philosophical debate long before Aristotle. Philosophers such as Prodicus of Ceos, Protagoras, and numerous rhapsodes had spoken there. The most famous philosophers to teach there were Isocrates, Plato (of The Academy), and the best-known Athenian teacher, Socrates. In addition to military training and educational pursuits, the Lyceum also housed Athenian Assembly meetings before the Pnyx became the official meeting place in the fifth century BCE. Cult practices of various groups were also held at the Lyceum.

The Lyceum was named for the Greek god Apollo Lyceus. Initially a sanctuary made for worshiping Lyceus, it later became a public exercise area, with a gymnasium being constructed later on. It is unknown when this worship was introduced to Athens or when the Lyceum became the sanctuary.

The Lyceum was located outside and east of Athens's city wall. The Lyceum is famous for being a center of education, but it was used for numerous other activities including Athenian assembly gatherings, cult practices, and military exercises. Because the Lyceum had to serve many purposes, the building had to have specific structures developed to accommodate all the activities. The area it was built on had many open spaces with forests. It was bound on the south by the Ilissus river and the north by the mountain Lykabettus. There were many roads that led to the Lyceum from in the city and around the city. The area had increasing numbers of buildings constructed between the sixth century BC to sixth century AD. Overall it is thought that the Lyceum spanned north possibly to modern Kolonaki plateia, south as far as the Ilissos river. It spanned east through the modern national gardens and the city wall, close to modern Amelia's Boulevard, was the western boundary.

The Lyceum has been referenced in numerous ancient works of literature including stories by Plato, Strabo, and Xenophon. Plato mentions the Lyceum in his dialogue Lysis, telling of Socrates walking down a road from the academy to the Lyceum to meet his friends Hippothales and Ktesippos close to the Panops springhouse. Strabo mentions the springhouse in his story and mentions that it is near the Lyceum and the Ilissus river flows from above the Agrai and the Lyceum. Lastly, Xenophon says that the Lyceum served as a meeting place for the Athenian troops when the Spartans raided the city from east of the city to their encampment at Dekelaia.

Within the Lyceum were many areas serving different purposes. A few were the apodyterion, dromoi, peripatetic, palastra, and gymnasium. The apodyterion was a changing room that was either part of the gymnasium or the palmistry. The dromoi and peripatoi were roads that ran from the east to the west through the modern-day Syntagma square and Parliament building. The palaistra was a wrestling school that was used as the scene for Plato's Euthydemus. It served three functions: a training area, an area for cult activity, and a meeting place for philosophical discussion. The gymnasium was repaired in the 330s BC, but it is thought to have been originally built by Pericles in the fifth century or Pisistratus in the sixth century.

The Lyceum was used as a location for philosophical discussion before Aristotle's school was founded there. Socrates, Protagoras, and Prodicus of Chios travelled to the Lyceum during fifth century BC to teach, debate, and discuss their findings. Isocrates also taught rhetoric at the Lyceum during the fourth century BC. Aristotle returned to Athens in 335 BC and established a school in one of the buildings of the Lyceum, lecturing there as well as writing most of his books and collecting books for the first European library in history. Aristotle had always been a book collector and the library grew with the books Alexander sent him, he also sent plant and animal species that allows for Aristotle to open a museum. The library attracted many scholars to his school, and they become teachers and conducted research. Students were able to study any subject available at the time. His school was compared to a factory that made professionals of any kind.

== Aristotle's school and library ==
In 335 BCE, Athens fell under Macedonian rule and Aristotle, aged 50, returned from Asia. Upon his return, Aristotle began teaching regularly in the morning in the Lyceum and founded an official school called "The Lyceum". After morning lessons, Aristotle would frequently lecture on the grounds for the public, and manuscripts of his compiled lectures were eventually circulated. The group of scholars who followed the Aristotelian doctrine came to be known as the Peripatetics due to Aristotle's tendency to walk as he taught.

Aristotle's main focus as a teacher was cooperative research, an idea which he founded through his natural history work and systematic collection of philosophical works to contribute to his library. His students were assigned historical or scientific research projects as part of their studies. The school was also student run. The students elected a new student administrator to work with the school leadership every ten days, allowing all the students to become involved in turn. Before returning to Athens, Aristotle had been the tutor of Alexander of Macedonia, who became the great conqueror Alexander the Great.

Throughout his conquests of various regions, Alexander collected plant and animal specimens for Aristotle's research, allowing Aristotle to develop the first zoo and botanical garden in recorded history. It is also suspected that Alexander donated what would be the equivalent of more than 4 million dollars to the Lyceum. In 322 BCE, Aristotle was forced to flee Athens with his family when the political leadership reacted against the Macedonians again and his previously published works supporting Macedonian rule left him a target. He passed on his Lyceum to Theophrastus and died later that year in Chalcis, near his hometown.

=== History of Aristotle's library ===
Theophrastus placed a provision in his will that left the Lyceum library, which at this point included both his and Aristotle's work as well as student research, philosophical historical texts and histories of philosophy, to his supposed follower, Neleus. However, the seniors of the Lyceum placed Strato as the next leader and upon his retirement from the school in the mid third century BCE, Neleus divorced the Lyceum from its library and took all of the books with him to Skepsis in Mysia. Neleus was an expert on Theophrastus and Aristotle, and it may be that Theophrastus hoped he would prepare a catalogue of the 10,000 rolls of papyrus. At least some of the books seem to have been sold to the library in Alexandria. In the tenth century, a catalogue of the library revealed manuscripts by both Theophrastus and Aristotle which almost had to have been obtained from Neleus. The rest seem to have been hidden by his family, known for their ignorance.

The library then disappeared for several centuries until it appears to have been bought from Neleus's heirs in the first century BCE and returned to the school. However, when Sulla attacked Athens, the books were shipped to Rome. Throughout their travels one fifth of Aristotle's works were lost and thus are not a part of the modern Aristotelian collection. Still, what did remain of Aristotle's works and the rest of the library were arranged and edited for school use between 73 and 20 BCE, supposedly by Andronicus of Rhodes, the Lyceum's eleventh leader. Since then, the remaining works have been translated and widely distributed, providing much of the modern knowledge of ancient Western philosophy.

== The Lyceum after Aristotle ==
As head of the Lyceum, Theophrastus continued Aristotle's foci of observation, collaborative research and documentation of philosophical history, thus making his own contributions to the library, most notably as the first organizer of botany. Though he was not a citizen of Athens (he had met Aristotle in the 340s in his homeland of Lesbos) he managed to buy land near the main gym of the Lyceum as well as several buildings for the library and additional workspace in 315 BCE. Theophrastus continued his own work while teaching and demonstrated his devotion to learning and education by leaving the land of the Lyceum to his friends to continue their work in education in philosophy in the non-private tradition of the school upon his death.

The school was closed for a year (306 BCE) when all foreign philosophers were required to leave Athens. It seems to have gone into decline from c. 300, and to have more or less disintegrated sometime after 225 BCE when its last certain scholar, Lyco of Troas, died and left the Lyceum not to one man but to all his colleagues. The Lyceum fell with the rest of Athens in 86 BCE.

There is some thought that the Lyceum was refounded in the first century CE by Andronicus of Rhodes and once again flourished as a philosophical school in the second century, continuing until the Heruli and Goths sacked Athens in 267 CE.

=== Leaders of the Lyceum ===
Theophrastus headed the Lyceum for 36 years, between Aristotle's exile from Athens in 322 BCE until his own death in 286 BCE. There is some speculation that both Aristotle and Theophrastus were buried in the gardens of the Lyceum, though no graves have been positively identified. Theophrastus was followed by Strato of Lampsacus, who served as head until 268. Lyco of Troas, likely Aristo of Ceos, Critolaus, Diodorus of Tyre and Erymneus were the next several heads of the school. Additionally, Andronicus of Rhodes served as the eleventh head.

=== Members of the Lyceum ===
Scholars and students at the Lyceum include Eudemus, a mathematical historian, Aristoxenus, who wrote works on music, and Dicaearchus, a prolific writer on topics including ethics, politics, psychology and geography. Additionally, medical historian Meno, and an eventual ruler of Athens, Demetrius of Phaleron, spent time at the school. Demetrius of Phaleron ruled Athens as a proxy leader for a dynasty from 307 BCE.

== Aristotle's Lyceum today ==
The location of the Lyceum is: 37°58′26.67″N 23°44′36.61″E.

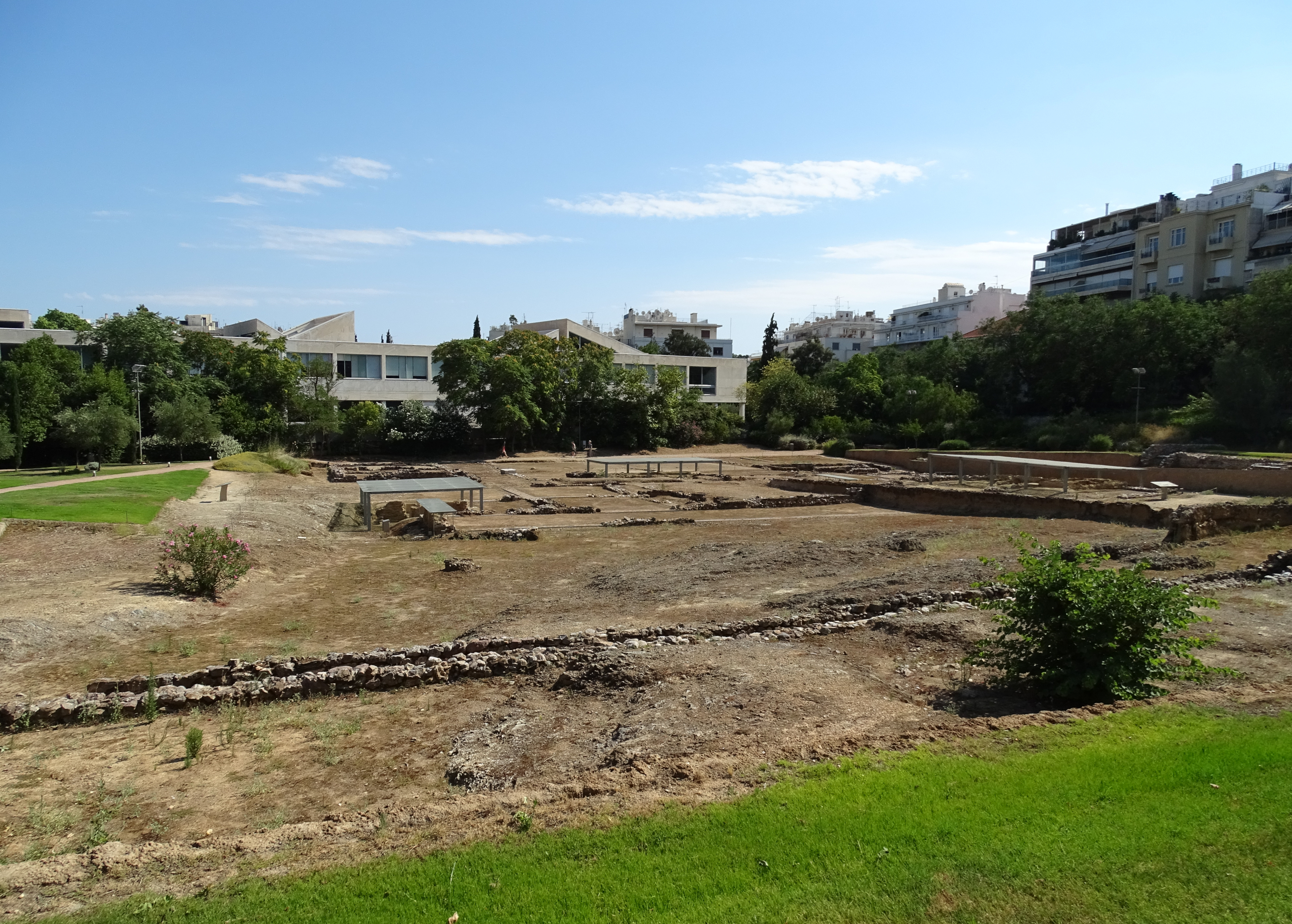
The site of the excavations

During a 1996 excavation to clear space for Athens' new Museum of Modern Art, the remains of Aristotle's Lyceum were uncovered. Descriptions from the works of ancient heirs hint at the location of the grounds, speculated to be somewhere just outside the eastern boundary of ancient Athens, near the rivers Ilissos and Eridanos, and close to Lycabettus Hill. The excavation site is located in downtown Athens, by the junction of Rigillis and Vasilissis Sofias Streets, next to the Athens War Museum and the National Conservatory. The first excavations revealed a gymnasium and wrestling area, but further work has uncovered the majority of what is believed to have withstood the erosion caused to the site by nearby architecture's placement and drainage. The buildings are definitely those of the original Lyceum, as their foundations lie on the bedrock and there are no other strata further below. Upon realizing the magnitude of the discovery, contingency plans were made for a nearby construction of the Art Museum so that it could be combined with a Lyceum outdoor museum and give visitors easy access to both. There are plans for canopies to be placed over the Lyceum remains, and the area was opened to the public in 2009. It is now a park.

== See also ==
- School of Aristotle
- Lyceum movement
- Platonic Academy
- Cynosarges
- Theophrastus
