= Republic (Plato) =

Philosophical work by Plato around 375 BC

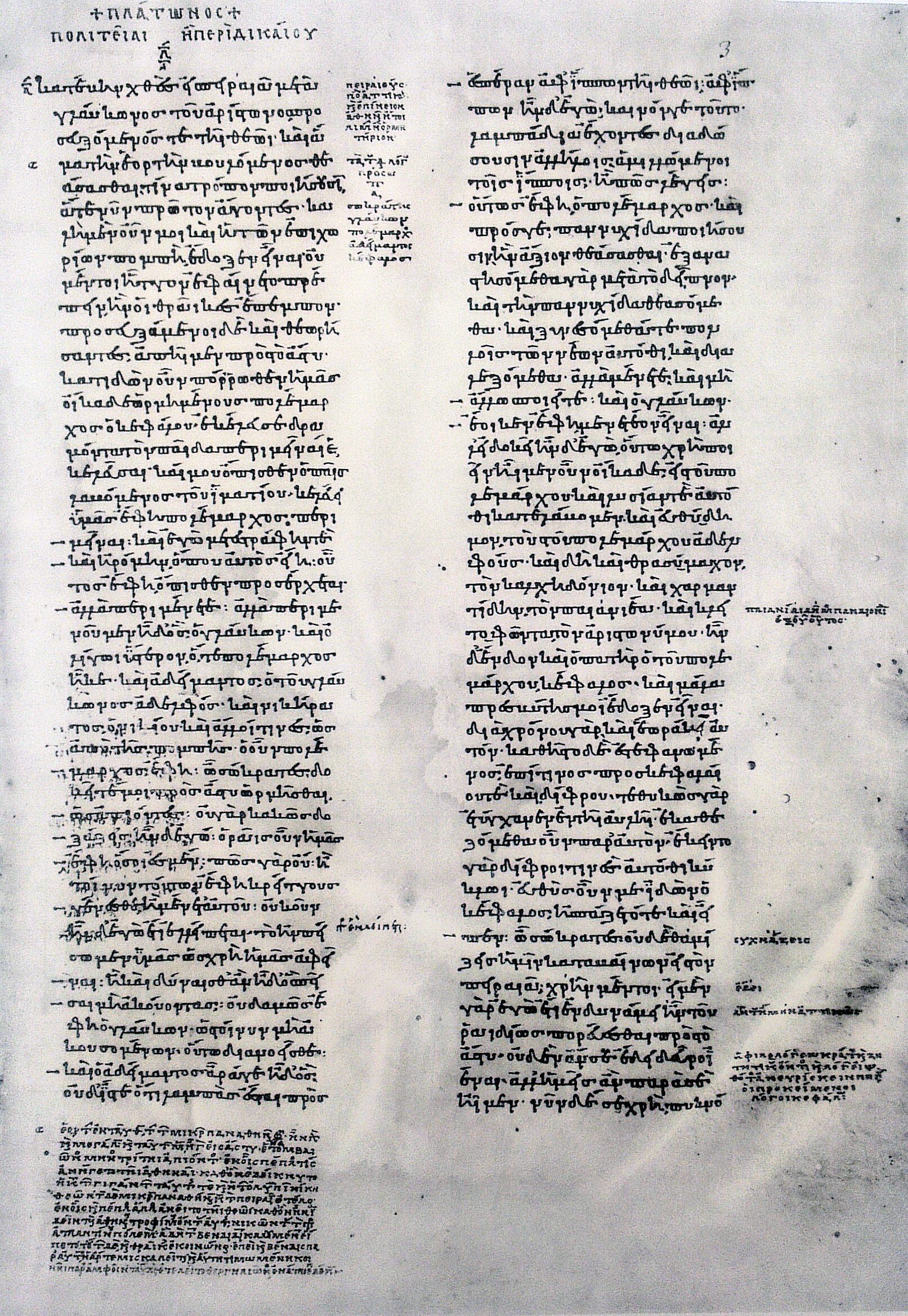
- Title page of the oldest complete manuscript: Paris, Bibliothèque Nationale, Gr. 1807 (late 9th century)
- Author: Plato
- Original title: Πολιτεία
- Language: Ancient Greek
- Subject: Political philosophy; Ethics
- Published: c. 375 BC
- Publication place: Ancient Greece
- Text: Republic at Wikisource

The Republic (Ancient Greek: Πολιτεία, romanized: Politeia; Latin: De Republica) is a Socratic dialogue authored by Plato around 375 BC, concerning justice (dikaiosúnē), the order and character of the just city-state, and the just man. It is Plato's best-known work, and one of the world's most influential works of philosophy and political theory, both intellectually and historically.

In the dialogue, Socrates discusses with various Athenians and foreigners the meaning of justice and whether the just man is happier than the unjust man. He considers the natures of existing regimes and then proposes a series of hypothetical cities in comparison, culminating in Kallipolis (Καλλίπολις), a utopian city-state ruled by a class of philosopher-kings. They also discuss aging, love, theory of forms, the immortality of the soul, and the role of the philosopher and of poetry in society. The dialogue's setting seems to be the time of the Peloponnesian War.

== Place in Plato's corpus ==
The Republic is generally placed in the middle period of Plato's dialogues. However, the distinction of the middle dialogues from the early dialogues is not as clear as the distinction of the late dialogues from all the others. Nonetheless, Ritter, Arnim, and Baron—each adopting separate methodologies—agree that the Republic was well distinguished, along with Parmenides, Phaedrus and Theaetetus.

The first book of the Republic, which shares many features with earlier dialogues, is thought to have originally been written as a separate work, with the remaining books being conjoined to it, perhaps with modifications to the original of the first book.

== Outline ==
=== Book I: Aging, Love, and the Definitions of Justice (327a–354c) ===
Socrates and Glaucon visit Athens' port, Piraeus, when they are intercepted by Polemarchus who demands that they join him for a dinner and festival. Polemarchus points out that his men are superior in number and therefore Socrates and Glaucon must comply. Socrates asks if he might be persuaded otherwise but Polemarchus replies that he will refuse to listen. Socrates agrees to go. At Polemarchus' house, Socrates encounters Polemarchus' father, Cephalus.

==== Cephalus (328e–331d) ====
In his first philosophical conversation with the group members, Socrates asks the aged Cephalus, "is life painful at that age, or what report do you make of it?" Cephalus answers by saying that many are unhappy about old age because they miss their youth, but he finds that "old age brings us profound repose and freedom from this and other passions. When the appetites have abated, and their force is diminished, the description of Sophocles is perfectly realized. It is like being delivered from a multitude of furious masters." The repose gives him time to dedicate himself to sacrifices and justice so that he is prepared for the afterlife.

The discussion then turns to the definition of justice. Cephalus says that justice is honesty and returning to people that which they are owed. Socrates refutes this by arguing that it would not be just to honestly return a borrowed knife to a man who has since gone mad and would harm himself with it.

==== Polemarchus (331d–336b) ====
Polemarchus argues that justice is giving what is appropriate to others — to do good to one's friends and bad to his enemies. Socrates refutes this in four parts, concluding that harming anyone, even one's enemies, in itself creates injustice, and thus cannot appear just.

==== Thrasymachus (336b–354c) ====
Thrasymachus then argues that justice is that which is advantageous for the stronger. Socrates responds by posing the scenario where the strong make mistakes that are not advantageous to them. Thrasymachus then responds by claiming that one is stronger when he does not make mistakes as to their advantage. Socrates refutes this, arguing that the act of doing crafts is for the good of the object, and therefore to rule is for the benefit of the ruled and not the ruler. Thrasymachus then observes that the shepherd, for example, herds his sheep not for their benefit but for his own, and argues that injustice is better than justice, for one who commits undetected injustice to satisfy his own desires is better off than the just person.

Socrates further observes that a shepherd's concern for his sheep is different from his concern to make money, which is extraneous to the art or craft of shepherding, and that no power or art provides what is beneficial to itself. He claims that the best rulers are reluctant to rule but do so out of necessity: they do not wish to be ruled by someone inferior. Socrates then gives three arguments in favour of the just life over the unjust life, centering on wisdom, harmony, and the soul.

=== Book II: Ring of Gyges (357a–383c) ===
Glaucon and Adeimantus are unsatisfied with Socrates's defense of justice. They ask Socrates to defend justice as a thing good in itself, and not only for its consequences. To demonstrate the problem, Glaucon tells the story of Gyges, who – with the help of a ring that turns him invisible – achieves great advantages for himself by committing injustices. He uses this argument to challenge Socrates to defend the position that the just life is better than the unjust life.

Socrates suggests that they use the city as an image to seek how justice comes to be in the soul of an individual. After attributing the origin of society to the individual not being self-sufficient and having many needs which he cannot supply himself, Socrates first describes a "healthy state" made up of producers who make enough for a modest subsistence, but Glaucon considers this hardly different from "a city of pigs." Socrates then alters his original plan to accommodate Glaucon's demand for more luxuries. He decides to create an image of justice coming to be in not just any city but a luxurious one with a desire for "endless variety" in what he calls "a fevered state". Acquiring and defending these luxuries requires a guardian class to wage wars.

Socrates then asks how the guardians will not become tyrants to the people they guard. He concludes that it is necessary for there to be careful education of the guardians, which education would involve censorship of poetry and stories. He argues that stories that either ascribe evil to the gods or heroes or portray the afterlife as bad are untrue and should not be taught.

=== Book III: Noble lie (386a–417b) ===
Socrates further describes the program of censored education in such a city: Poetry should be censored in such a way that encourages courage, obedience, cunning, and self-discipline, while discouraging the fear of death, laughter, absolute truthfulness, avarice, or hubris. Further, the guardians will require physical training to prevent illness, benefit the soul, and in preparation for war. From the guardians, the rulers of the city will be selected, which rulers shall act only in the city's advantage. For the citizens to accept their role in society, the rulers must perpetuate a noble lie (γενναῖον ψεῦδος, gennaion pseudos).

The noble lie is illustrated by Socrates's myth or parable of the metals. In this version of the noble lie, each human is regarded as either containing gold, silver, or bronze. Thus, correspondingly, they are best suited to rule, guard, or merely produce. Socrates claims that if the people believed "this myth...[it] would have a good effect, making them more inclined to care for the state and one another."

Socrates then ends with the conditions in which the guardians must live. For example, they shall be prohibited from privacy, and wealth, and owning private property, so as to keep their focus on the good of the city.

=== Book IV: Kallipolis, cardinal virtues, and the soul (419a–445e) ===
At this point, Adeimantus interrupts Socrates, noting that in such situations, the guardians are likely to be unhappy. Socrates argues that in the just city (Kallipolis), it is the entire city's happiness that is maximised, and not just that of the guardian class. To achieve this, it is necessary for certain conditions to be satisfied, such as the strict education of the guardians and the rules imposed upon them. Moderation, for example, must be emphasised, since both poverty and excessive wealth will corrupt the guardians. In this ideal city, it would be pointless to worry over specific laws, like those pertaining to contracts, since proper education ensures lawful behavior, and poor education causes lawlessness. Socrates further observes that in such a just city, the guardians will share wives and children.

Having established the theory of the Kallipolis, Socrates argues that because the city is completely good and virtuous, it embodies the four cardinal virtues of wisdom, courage, justice and temperance. He then proceeds to search for wisdom, courage, and temperance in the city, on the grounds that justice will be easier to discern in what remains. He finds wisdom among the guardian rulers, courage among the guardian warriors, temperance among all classes of the city in agreeing about who should rule and who should be ruled. Finally, Socrates defines justice in the city as each class performing only its own work, and not meddling in the work of the other classes.

Socrates then creates an analogy between the parts of the city and the soul. He argues that psychological conflict points to a divided soul, since a completely unified soul could not behave in opposite ways towards the same object, at the same time, and in the same respect. He gives examples of possible conflicts between the rational, spirited, and appetitive parts of the soul, corresponding to the rulers, auxiliaries, and producing classes in the city. Having established the tripartite soul, Socrates defines the virtues of the individual. A person is wise if he is ruled by the part of the soul that sees and knows "what is beneficial for each part and for the whole," courageous if his spirited part "preserves in the midst of pleasures and pains" the decisions reached by the rational part, and temperate if the three parts agree that the rational part lead. They are just if each part of the soul attends to its function and not the function of another. It follows from this definition that one cannot be just if one does not have the other cardinal virtues.

Having established the theory of justice as a balance between the parts of the soul, Socrates seeks to address the remaining question whether justice is better than unpunished injustice by exposition of a broader political theory.

=== Book V (449a–480a): Philosopher-kings and the theory of forms ===
At this point, Adeimantus again interrupts Socrates, questioning him on the point about the sharing of wives and children. Socrates is overwhelmed at what he perceives to be an "ambush" on his argument.

He then goes on to elaborate his theory in detail: In the Kallipolis, both male and female guardians will receive the same education and perform the same roles, for sex is not relevant to the governance of the city. The rulers of the city, nonetheless, should govern sexual intercourse by organising sex festivals in which a rigged lottery will be held, allowing the best male guardians to have sex with as many female citizens as he wants. The subsequent children shall be raised in ignorance of their parents, and vice versa, so that all parents think of all children as their own. Socrates notes the risk of incest.

Socrates is about to discuss his theory of war, when Glaucon interrupts him, questioning the feasibility of such a city. In response, Socrates concedes the difficulty of establishing such a city but notes the theoretical value of the ideal in discussing concepts of justice and injustice. Nonetheless, Socrates believes that such a city may come into being, but only if ruled by a philosopher, who would thus be known as a philosopher-king. This is because, according to Socrates, only philosophers are unlike persons who merely have opinions, for philosophers have knowledge through their understanding of the Forms.

=== Book VI (484a–511e): Ship of State, Form of the Good, and the first two analogies ===
Socrates continues to argue for why philosophers should rule, when he is interrupted by Adeimantus, who observes that philosophers are corrupt, strange, or useless.

==== Ship of State (488a–489d) ====
Socrates refutes Adeimantus's argument by likening the governance of a city-state to the command of a ship, the Ship of State.

==== Form of the Good (505a–505e) ====
Socrates argues that in the ideal city, a true philosopher with understanding of forms will facilitate the harmonious co-operation of all the citizens of the city. This philosopher-king must be intelligent, reliable, and willing to lead a simple life. However, these qualities are rarely manifested on their own, and so they must be encouraged through education and the study of the Form of the Good.

==== The Sun and Divided Line (507c–511e) ====
Socrates then offers two analogies to illustrate the Form of the Good: that of the Sun and the Divided Line.

=== Book VII (514a–541b): Allegory of the cave ===
Building from his previous two analogies, Socrates offers the allegory of the cave. The allegory depicts Plato's distinction between the world of appearances and the 'real' world of the Forms.

=== Book VIII (543a–569c) ===
Returning to his earlier point, Socrates categorises governments into five types of regimes: aristocracy, timocracy, oligarchy, democracy, and tyranny, in the course of which Plato's number is enigmatically mentioned.

The starting point is an imagined, alternate, just aristocracy ruled by a philosopher-king. Aristocracy degenerates into timocracy when, due to miscalculation on the part of its governing class, the next generation includes persons of an inferior nature, inclined not just to cultivating virtues but also producing wealth. In a timocracy, governors will apply great effort in gymnastics and the arts of war, as well as the virtue that pertains to them, that of courage. As the emphasis on honor is compromised by wealth accumulation, it is replaced by oligarchy. The oligarchic government is dominated by the desiring element, in which the rich are the ruling class. Oligarchs do, however, value at least one virtue, that of temperance and moderation—not out of an ethical principle or spiritual concern, but because by dominating wasteful tendencies they succeed in accumulating money.

From the conflicts arising out of tensions in an oligarchy, according to Socrates, the poor majority overthrow the wealthy minority, and democracy replaces the oligarchy preceding it. In democracy, the lower class grows bigger and bigger. The populism of the democratic government leads to mob rule, fueled by fear of oligarchy, which a clever demagogue can exploit to take power and establish tyranny where no one has discipline and society exists in chaos. In a tyrannical government, the city is enslaved to the tyrant, who uses his guards to remove the best social elements and individuals from the city to retain power, while leaving the worst. He will also provoke warfare to consolidate his position as leader. In this way, tyranny is the most unjust regime of all.

=== Book IX (571a–592b) ===
In parallel to this, Socrates considers the individual or soul that corresponds to each of these regimes.

He describes how an aristocrat may become weak or detached from political and material affluence, and how his son will respond to this by becoming overly ambitious. The timocrat in turn may be defeated by the courts or vested interests; his son responds by accumulating wealth in order to gain power in society and defend himself against the same predicament, thereby becoming an oligarch. The oligarch's son will grow up with wealth without having to practice thrift or stinginess, and will be tempted and overwhelmed by his desires, so that he becomes democratic, valuing freedom above all. The democratic man is torn between tyrannical passions and oligarchic discipline, and ends up in the middle ground: valuing all desires, both good and bad. The tyrant will be tempted in the same way as the democrat, but without an upbringing in discipline or moderation to restrain him. Therefore, his most base desires and wildest passions overwhelm him, and he becomes driven by lust, using force and fraud to take whatever he wants. The tyrant is both a slave to his lusts, and a master to whomever he can enslave.

Socrates points out the human tendency to be corrupted by power leads down the road to timocracy, oligarchy, democracy and tyranny. From this, he concludes that ruling should be left to philosophers, who are the most just and therefore least susceptible to corruption. This "good city" is depicted as being governed by philosopher-kings; disinterested persons who rule not for their personal enjoyment but for the good of the city-state (polis). The philosophers have seen the "Forms" and therefore know what is good. They understand the corrupting effect of greed and own no property and receive no salary.

=== Book X (595a–621d): Myth of Er ===
Concluding a theme brought up most explicitly in the Analogies of the Sun and Divided Line in Book VI, Socrates finally rejects any form of imitative art and concludes that such artists have no place in the just city. Artists create things but they are only different copies of the idea of the original."And whenever any one informs us that he has found a man who knows all the arts, and all things else that anybody knows, and every single thing with a higher degree of accuracy than any other man—whoever tells us this, I think that we can only imagine to be a simple creature who is likely to have been deceived by some wizard or actor whom he met, and whom he thought all-knowing, because he himself was unable to analyze the nature of knowledge and ignorance and imitation."

And the same object appears straight when looked at out of the water, and crooked when in the water; and the concave becomes convex, owing to the illusion about colours to which the sight is liable. Thus every sort of confusion is revealed within us; and this is that weakness of the human mind on which the art of conjuring and deceiving by light and shadow and other ingenious devices imposes, having an effect upon us like magic.

He speaks about illusions and confusion. Things can look very similar, but be different in reality. Because we are human, at times we cannot tell the difference between the two.

And does not the same hold also of the ridiculous? There are jests which you would be ashamed to make yourself, and yet on the comic stage, or indeed in private, when you hear them, you are greatly amused by them, and are not at all disgusted at their unseemliness—the case of pity is repeated—there is a principle in human nature which is disposed to raise a laugh, and this which you once restrained by reason, because you were afraid of being thought a buffoon, is now let out again; and having stimulated the risible faculty at the theatre, you are betrayed unconsciously to yourself into playing the comic poet at home.

With all of us, we may approve of something, as long we are not directly involved with it. If we joke about it, we are supporting it.

Quite true, he said. And the same may be said of lust and anger and all the other affections, of desire and pain and pleasure, which are held to be inseparable from every action—in all of them poetry feeds and waters the passions instead of drying them up; she lets them rule, although they ought to be controlled, if mankind are ever to increase in happiness and virtue.

Sometimes we let our passions rule our actions or way of thinking, although they should be controlled, so that we can increase our happiness.

He continues on to argue for the immortality of the psyche and espouses a theory of reincarnation and details the rewards of being just, both in this life and the next. Socrates tells a story he heard about a man named Er who dies and comes back to life after twelve days. Er remembers what happened in the afterlife and describes how people were punished and rewarded depending on if they were just or not. Afterwards they got to choose a new life to be reincarnated into. He describes how the choices made by the souls were determined mostly by habit, desire for pleasure and fear of painful experiences they had previously experienced. Socrates concludes the discussion by saying that while the story advocates for just behavior by describing souls that are inconstant and motivated by reward and punishment, he would rather persuade his companions to believe and act on the basis that the soul is immortal and capable of remaining constant in the face of any pleasure or pain.

== Legacy ==
=== Ancient Greece and Rome ===
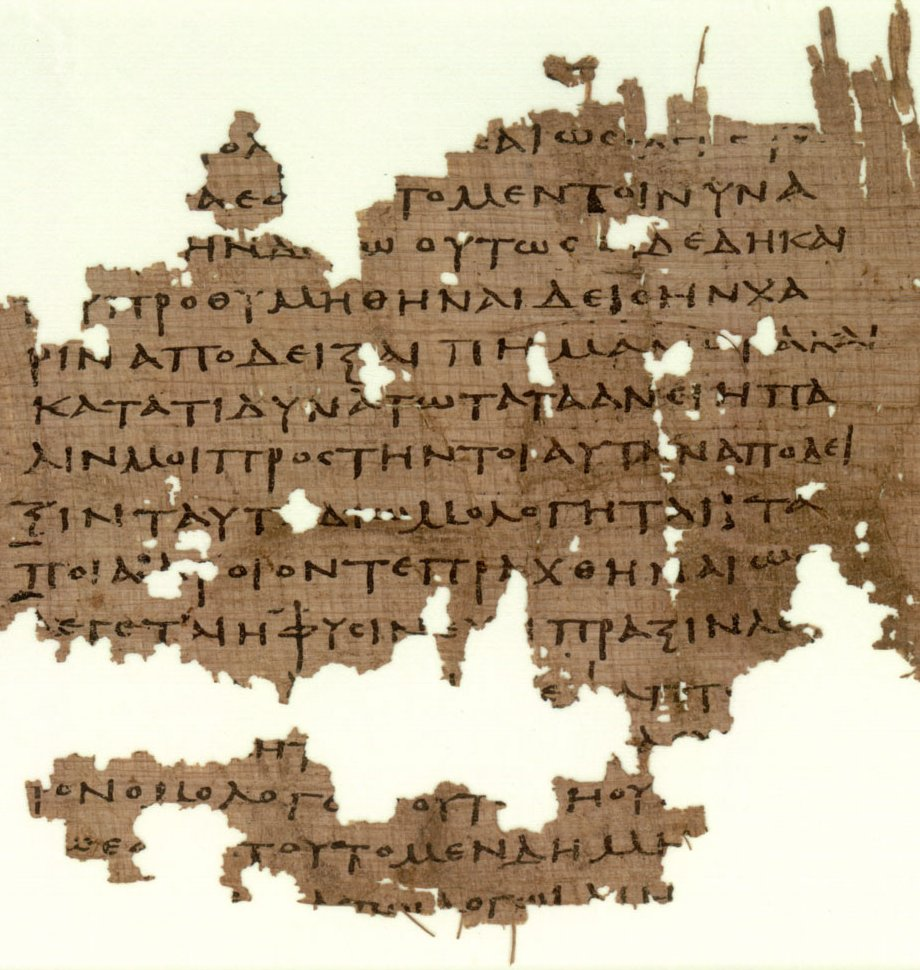
P. Oxy. 3679, manuscript from the 3rd century AD, containing fragments of Plato's Republic

Aristotle systematises many of Plato's analyses in his Politics, and criticizes the propositions of several political philosophers for the ideal city-state.

Zeno of Citium, the founder of Stoicism, wrote his version of an ideal society, Zeno's Republic, in opposition to Plato's Republic. Zeno's Republic was controversial and was viewed with some embarrassment by some of the later Stoics due to its defenses of free love, incest, and cannibalism and due to its opposition to ordinary education and the building of temples, law-courts, and gymnasia.

The English title of Plato's dialogue is derived from Cicero's De re publica, written some three centuries later. Res publica is not an exact translation of Plato's Greek title politeia. Rather, politeia is a general term for the actual and potential forms of government for a polis or city-state, and Plato attempts to survey all possible forms of the state, while Cicero's discussion focuses more on the improvement of the Roman Republic. Cicero's dialogue imitates Plato's style and treats many of the same topics, and Cicero's main character Scipio Aemilianus expresses his esteem for Plato and Socrates.

Augustine of Hippo wrote his The City of God; Augustine equally described a model of the "ideal city", in his case the eternal Jerusalem, using a visionary language not unlike that of the preceding philosophers.

Several Oxyrhynchus Papyri fragments were found to contain parts of the Republic, and from other works such as Phaedo, or the dialogue Gorgias, written around 200–300 CE. Fragments of a different version of Plato's Republic were discovered in 1945, part of the Nag Hammadi library, written c. 350 CE. These findings highlight the influence of Plato during those times in Egypt.

=== Middle Ages ===
==== Ibn Rushd ====
Islamic philosophers were much more interested in Aristotle than Plato, but not having access to Aristotle's Politics, Ibn Rushd (Averroes) produced instead a commentary on Plato's Republic. He advances an authoritarian ideal, following Plato's paternalistic model. Absolute monarchy, led by a philosopher-king, creates a justly ordered society. This requires extensive use of coercion, although persuasion is preferred and is possible if the young are properly raised. Rhetoric, not logic, is the appropriate road to truth for the common man. Demonstrative knowledge via philosophy and logic requires special study. Rhetoric aids religion in reaching the masses.

Following Plato, Ibn Rushd accepts the principle of women's equality. They should be educated and allowed to serve in the military; the best among them might be tomorrow's philosophers or rulers. He also accepts Plato's illiberal measures such as the censorship of literature. He uses examples from Arab history to illustrate just and degenerate political orders.

=== Thomas More ===
Thomas More, when writing his Utopia, invented the technique of using the portrayal of a "utopia" as the carrier of his thoughts about the ideal society. More's island Utopia is also similar to Plato's Republic in some aspects, among them common property and the lack of privacy.

=== Hegel ===
Hegel respected Plato's theories of state and ethics much more than those of the early modern philosophers such as Locke, Hobbes and Rousseau, whose theories proceeded from a fictional "state of nature" defined by humanity's "natural" needs, desires and freedom. For Hegel this was a contradiction: since nature and the individual are contradictory, the freedoms which define individuality as such are latecomers on the stage of history. Therefore, these philosophers unwittingly projected man as an individual in modern society onto a primordial state of nature. Plato however had managed to grasp the ideas specific to his time:

Plato is not the man to dabble in abstract theories and principles; his truth-loving mind has recognized and represented the truth of the world in which he lived, the truth of the one spirit that lived in him as in Greece itself. No man can overleap his time, the spirit of his time is his spirit also; but the point at issue is, to recognize that spirit by its content.

For Hegel, Plato's Republic is not an abstract theory or ideal which is too good for the real nature of man, but rather is not ideal enough, not good enough for the ideals already inherent or nascent in the reality of his time; a time when Greece was entering decline. One such nascent idea was about to crush the Greek way of life: modern freedoms—or Christian freedoms in Hegel's view—such as the individual's choice of his social class, or of what property to pursue, or which career to follow. Such individual freedoms were excluded from Plato's Republic:

Plato recognized and caught up the true spirit of his times, and brought it forward in a more definite way, in that he desired to make this new principle an impossibility in his Republic.

Greece being at a crossroads, Plato's new "constitution" in the Republic was an attempt to preserve Greece: it was a reactionary reply to the new freedoms of private property etc., that were eventually given legal form through Rome. Accordingly, in ethical life, it was an attempt to introduce a religion that elevated each individual not as an owner of property, but as the possessor of an immortal soul.

=== 20th century ===
Mussolini admired Plato's Republic, which he often read for inspiration. The Republic expounded a number of ideas that fascism promoted, such as rule by an elite promoting the state as the ultimate end, opposition to democracy, protecting the class system and promoting class collaboration, rejection of egalitarianism, promoting the militarization of a nation by creating a class of warriors, demanding that citizens perform civic duties in the interest of the state, and utilizing state intervention in education to promote the development of warriors and future rulers of the state. Plato was an idealist, focused on achieving justice and morality, while Mussolini and fascism were realist, focused on achieving political goals.

Martin Luther King Jr. nominated the Republic as the one book he would wish to have on a desert island, aside from the Bible.

=== 21st century ===
In 2001, a survey of over 1,000 academics and students voted the Republic the greatest philosophical text ever written. Julian Baggini argued that although the work "was wrong on almost every point, the questions it raises and the methods it uses are essential to the western tradition of philosophy. Without it we might not have philosophy as we know it." In 2021, a survey showed that the Republic is the most studied book in the top universities in the United States.

=== Cultural influence ===
Plato's Republic has been influential in literature and art.

- Aldous Huxley's Brave New World has a dystopian government that bears a resemblance to the form of government described in the Republic, featuring the separation of people by professional class, assignment of profession and purpose by the state, and the absence of traditional family units, replaced by state-organized breeding.
- The Orwellian dystopia depicted in the novel 1984 had many characteristics in common with Plato's description of the allegory of the Cave as Winston Smith strives to liberate himself from it.
- In the early 1970s the Dutch composer Louis Andriessen composed a vocal work called De Staat, based on the text of Plato's Republic.
- In Robert A. Heinlein's Starship Troopers, his citizen can be compared to a Platonic Guardian, without the communal breeding and property, but still having a militaristic base. Although there are significant differences in the specifics of the system, Heinlein and Plato both describe systems of limited franchise, with a political class that has supposedly earned their power and wisely governs the whole. The Republic is specifically attacked in Starship Troopers. The arachnids can be seen as much closer to a Republic society than the humans.
- The film The Matrix models Plato's Allegory of the Cave.
- In fiction, Jo Walton's 2015 novel The Just City explored the consequences of establishing a city-state based on the Republic in practice.
- See also Ring of Gyges: Cultural influences

== Criticism ==
=== Gadamer ===
In his 1934 Plato und die Dichter (Plato and the Poets), as well as several other works, Hans-Georg Gadamer describes the utopic city of the Republic as a heuristic utopia that should not be pursued or even be used as an orientation-point for political development. Rather, its purpose is said to be to show how things would have to be connected, and how one thing would lead to another—often with highly problematic results—if one would opt for certain principles and carry them through rigorously. This interpretation argues that large passages in Plato's writing are ironic, a line of thought initially pursued by Kierkegaard.

=== Popper ===
The city portrayed in the Republic struck some critics as harsh, rigid, and unfree; indeed, as totalitarian. Karl Popper gave a voice to that view in his 1945 book The Open Society and Its Enemies, where he singled out Plato's state as a dystopia. Popper distinguished Plato's ideas from those of Socrates, claiming that the former in his later years expressed none of the humanitarian and democratic tendencies of his teacher. Popper thought Plato's envisioned state totalitarian as it advocated a government composed only of a distinct hereditary ruling class, with the working class—whom Popper argues Plato regards as "human cattle"—given no role in decision making. He argues that Plato has no interest in what are commonly regarded as the problems of justice—the resolution of disputes between individuals—because Plato has redefined justice as "keeping one's place".

Popper insists that the Republic "was meant by its author not so much as a theoretical treatise, but as a topical political manifesto", and Bertrand Russell argues that at least in intent, and all in all not so far from what was possible in ancient Greek city-states, the form of government portrayed in the Republic was meant as a practical one by Plato.

G. A. Cohen offers a contrasting argument that the ideal city in the Republic is not totalitarian in the strict sense, noting that totalitarian states pay deep attention to the private lives of their citizens, whereas Plato does not pay much attention to the lives of the non-guardian class unless they intervene in politics.

=== Voegelin ===
Many critics have suggested that the dialogue's political discussion actually serves as an analogy for the individual soul, in which there are also many different "members" that can either conflict or else be integrated and orchestrated under a just and productive "government." Among other things, this analogical reading would solve the problem of certain implausible statements Plato makes concerning an ideal political republic. Norbert Blössner (2007) argues that the Republic is best understood as an analysis of the workings and moral improvement of the individual soul with remarkable thoroughness and clarity. This view, of course, does not preclude a legitimate reading of the Republic as a political treatise (the work could operate at both levels). It merely implies that it deserves more attention as a work on psychology and moral philosophy than it has sometimes received.

Eric Voegelin in Plato and Aristotle (Baton Rouge, 1957), gave meaning to the concept of 'Just City in Speech' (Books II–V). For instance, there is evidence in the dialogue that Socrates himself would not be a member of his 'ideal' state. His life was almost solely dedicated to the private pursuit of knowledge. More practically, Socrates suggests that members of the lower classes could rise to the higher ruling class, and vice versa, if they had 'gold' in their veins—a version of the concept of social mobility. The exercise of power is built on the 'noble lie' that all men are brothers, born of the earth, yet there is a clear hierarchy and class divisions. There is a tripartite explanation of human psychology that is extrapolated to the city, the relation among peoples. There is no family among the guardians, another crude version of Max Weber's concept of bureaucracy as the state non-private concern. Together with Leo Strauss, Voegelin considered Popper's interpretation to be a gross misunderstanding not only of the dialogue itself, but of the very nature and character of Plato's entire philosophic enterprise.

The paradigm of the city—the idea of the Good, the Agathon—has manifold historical embodiments, undertaken by those who have seen the Agathon, and are ordered via the vision. The centerpiece of the Republic, Part II, nos. 2–3, discusses the rule of the philosopher, and the vision of the Agathon with the Allegory of the Cave, which is clarified in the theory of forms. The centerpiece is preceded and followed by the discussion of the means that will secure a well-ordered polis (city). Part II, no. 1, concerns marriage, the community of people and goods for the guardians, and the restraints on warfare among the Hellenes. It describes a partially communistic polis. Part II, no. 4, deals with the philosophical education of the rulers who will preserve the order and character of the city-state.

In part II, the Embodiment of the Idea, is preceded by the establishment of the economic and social orders of a polis (part I), followed by an analysis (part III) of the decline the order must traverse. The three parts compose the main body of the dialogues, with their discussions of the "paradigm", its embodiment, its genesis, and its decline.

The introduction and the conclusion are the frame for the body of the Republic. The discussion of right order is occasioned by the questions: "Is justice better than injustice?" and "Will an unjust man fare better than a just man?" The introductory question is balanced by the concluding answer: "Justice is preferable to injustice". In turn, the foregoing are framed with the Prologue (Book I) and the Epilogue (Book X). The prologue is a short dialogue about the common public doxai (opinions) about justice. Based upon faith, and not reason, the Epilogue describes the new arts and the immortality of the soul.

=== Strauss and Bloom ===
Some of Plato's proposals have led theorists like Leo Strauss and Allan Bloom to ask readers to consider the possibility that Socrates was creating not a blueprint for a real city, but a learning exercise for the young men in the dialogue. There are many points in the construction of the "Just City in Speech" that seem contradictory, which raise the possibility Socrates is employing irony to make the men in the dialogue question for themselves the ultimate value of the proposals. In turn, Plato has immortalized this 'learning exercise' in the Republic.

One of many examples is that Socrates calls the marriages of the ruling class 'sacred'; however, they last only one night and are the result of manipulating and drugging couples into predetermined intercourse with the aim of eugenically breeding guardian-warriors. Strauss and Bloom's interpretations, however, involve more than just pointing out inconsistencies; by calling attention to these issues they ask readers to think more deeply about whether Plato is being ironic or genuine, for neither Strauss nor Bloom present an unequivocal opinion, preferring to raise philosophic doubt over interpretive fact.

Strauss's approach developed out of a belief that Plato wrote esoterically. The basic acceptance of the exoteric-esoteric distinction revolves around whether Plato really wanted to see the "Just City in Speech" of Books V–VI come to pass, or whether it is just an allegory. Strauss never regarded this as the crucial issue of the dialogue. He argued against Karl Popper's literal view, citing Cicero's opinion that the Republic's true nature was to bring to light the nature of political things. In fact, Strauss undermines the justice found in the "Just City in Speech" by implying the city is not natural, it is a man-made conceit that abstracts away from the erotic needs of the body. The city founded in the Republic "is rendered possible by the abstraction from eros".

An argument that has been used against ascribing ironic intent to Plato is that Plato's Academy produced a number of tyrants who seized political power and abandoned philosophy for ruling a city. Despite being well-versed in Greek and having direct contact with Plato himself, some of Plato's former students like Clearchus, tyrant of Heraclea; Chaeron, tyrant of Pellene; Erastus and Coriscus, tyrants of Skepsis; Hermias of Atarneus and Assos; and Calippus, tyrant of Syracuse ruled people and did not impose anything like a philosopher-kingship. However, it can be argued whether these men became "tyrants" through studying in the Academy. Plato's school had an elite student body, some of whom would by birth, and family expectation, end up in the seats of power. Additionally, it is important that it is by no means obvious that these men were tyrants in the modern, totalitarian sense of the concept. Finally, since very little is actually known about what was taught at Plato's Academy, there is no small controversy over whether it was even in the business of teaching politics at all.

== Editions ==
=== English translations ===
- Davies, J. L. and Vaughan, D.J. (1852). The Republic of Plato, translated into English, with an introduction, analysis, and notes. London: Macmillan and Co., Ltd.
- Burges, George (1854). Plato: The Republic, Timaeus and Critias. New and literal version. London: H.G. Bohn.
- Jowett, Benjamin (1871). Plato: The Republic.
- Lee, H.D.P. (1955). Plato: The Republic. Middlesex: Penguin Classics.
- Bloom, Allan (1991) [1968]. The Republic of Plato. Translated, with notes and an interpretive essay. New York: Basic Books.
- Grube, G.M.A. (1992). Plato: The Republic. Revised by C.D.C. Reeve. Indianapolis: Hackett.
- Waterfield, Robin (1994). Plato: Republic. Translated, with notes and an introduction. Oxford: Oxford World's Classics.
- Griffith, Tom (2000). Plato: The Republic. Cambridge: Cambridge University Press.
- Allen, R.E. (2006). Plato: The Republic. New Haven: Yale University Press.
- Sachs, Joe (2007). Plato: Republic. Newburyport: Focus Publishing.
- Rowe, Christopher (2012). Plato: Republic. London: Penguin.

=== Greek ===
- Burnet, John (1902). Platonis opera. Vol. 4. Oxford: Clarendon.
- Slings, Simon R. (2003). Platonis Rempublicam. Oxford: Oxford University Press.

== See also ==
- Collectivism and individualism
- Mixed government
- Nous
- Orthotes onomaton
- Plato's number
- Ship of fools
