= Callipolis =

Callipolis is the Latinized form of Kallipolis (Καλλίπολις), which is Greek for "beautiful city", from κάλλος kallos (beauty) and πόλις polis (city). It was the name of several ancient cities, as well as the utopian city-state ruled by a philosopher-king, presented by Socrates in Plato's dialogue The Republic.

Cities named Kallipolis notably include:

- Callipolis (Aetolia), town of ancient Aetolia, Greece
- Callipolis (Caria), town of ancient Caria, Asia Minor
- Callipolis (Mysia), town of ancient Mysia, Asia Minor
- a peninsula in the Thracian Chersonesus, modern Gallipoli
- Gallipoli, Apulia (Kallipolis) in Apulia, southern Italy, a port on a peninsula into the Tarentine Gulf
- Callipolis (Thrace), a port on the Hellespont, the modern Gelibolu, Turkey

- a titular bishopric, Gelibolu#Bishopric; i.e., the Roman Catholic Diocese of Callipolis

- Some historians believe that there was an ancient Greek colony, named Kallipolis, at the place of modern Barcelona, Spain; see History of Barcelona

== Greek mythology ==
- Callipolis, son of Alcathous, son of Pelops

== See also ==
- Gallipoli (disambiguation)
