= Erymneus =

2nd-century BC Greek philosopher

Erymneus (Ancient Greek: Ἐρυμνεύς; fl. c. 110 BC) was a Peripatetic philosopher in Ancient Greece.

Erymneus succeeded Diodorus of Tyre as scholarch (leader) of the Lyceum. Very little is known about him, and he is known only because he is mentioned by Athenaeus. He instructed Athenion, whose identity is obscure, in philosophy. He led the school while Apellicon of Teos was a member. The school had a renewed vitality under Erymneus.
