= Peripatetic =

Peripatetic may refer to:

- Peripatetic school, a school of philosophy in Ancient Greece
- Peripatetic axiom, in philosophy
- Peripatetic minority, a mobile population moving among settled populations offering a craft or trade.
- Peripatetic Jats, an ethnic group in Afghanistan
- Peripatetic teacher, a traveling schoolteacher
