= Panthoides =

Ancient Greek philosopher

Panthoides (Greek: Πανθοίδης; fl. c. 275 BC) was a dialectician and philosopher of the Megarian school. He concerned himself with "the logical part of philosophy", and at some point taught the Peripatetic philosopher Lyco of Troas. He wrote a book called On Ambiguities, against which the Stoic philosopher Chrysippus wrote a treatise.

He disagreed with Diodorus Cronus concerning his Master Argument, arguing that something is possible which can never be true, and that the impossible can never be the consequence of the possible, and that therefore not everything that has happened is necessarily true. Diodorus's view was that everything that has happened must be true, and therefore, nothing is possible if it can never be true.
