= Theodora Doukaina =

Theodora Doukaina may refer to:

- Theodora Anna Doukaina Selvo (1058–1083), daughter of Byzantine emperor Constantine X Dukas and Eudokia Makrembolitissa; wife of Domenico Selvo, Doge of Venice
- Theodora Doukaina Vatatzaina (c. 1240 – 1303), Empress consort of Michael VIII Palaiologos
