= Astyanax (disambiguation) =

Astyanax can refer to:

- Astyanax son of Hector, Trojan warrior
- Astyanax (fish), a genus of fish
- The Astyanax, an arcade game
- Astyanax Douglass (1897–1975), an American professional baseball player
- Astyanax was a tyrant of Lampsacus. His downfall came as a result of his attitude toward a letter he received, which contained information about a plot against him. Instead of opening the letter immediately, he put it aside, choosing to focus on other matters. He was killed while still holding the letter, unaware of the danger it contained.
- Astyanax of Troas, was the father of Lyco of Troas
- a son of Heracles and Epilais
- 1871 Astyanax, a Jupiter Trojan asteroid
