= Hieronymus of Rhodes =

Greek philosopher (c. 290 – c. 230 BC)

Hieronymus of Rhodes (Ancient Greek: Ἱερώνυμος ὁ Ῥόδιος, romanized: Hierṓnymos ho Rhódios, Latin: Hieronymus Rhodius; c. 290 – c. 230 BC) was a Peripatetic philosopher, and an opponent of Arcesilaus and Lyco of Troas. Only a few fragments of his works survive, preserved in the quotations of later writers.

== Life ==
Hieronymus belonged to the Peripatetic school, though Cicero questions his right to the title. He appears to have lived down to the time of Ptolemy II Philadelphus. His philosophical opponents included not only the Academic philosopher Arcesilaus, but also the Peripatetic Lyco of Troas who was hostile towards him.

== Works ==
Hieronymus is frequently mentioned by Cicero, who tells us that he held the highest good to consist in freedom from pain and trouble, and denied that pleasure was to be sought for its own sake. There are quotations from his writings, and from his letters. Diogenes Laërtius mentions two works: On Suspense of Judgement and Scattered Notes. It would seem from Cicero, compared with Rufinus, that he was the same as the Hieronymus who wrote on numbers and feet. He may also have been the author of a work on poets, and a commentary on the Aspis of Hesiod.
