= Neleus (disambiguation) =

Neleus was a mythological king of Pylos.

Neleus (Ancient Greek: Νηλεύς) may also refer to:

- Neleus (son of Codrus), see Thales of Miletus
- Neleus of Scepsis, son of Coriscus of Scepsis, a disciple of Aristotle and Theophrastus
