= Eudokia Makrembolitissa =

Byzantine Empress from 1059 to 1071

- Augusta; Empress and Autocratess of the Romans
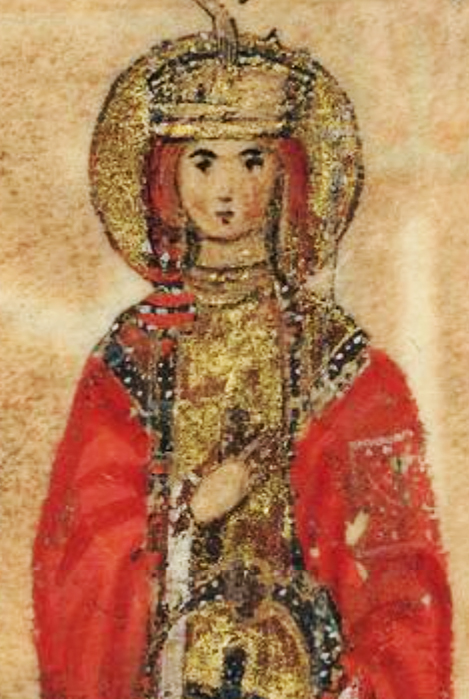
- Contemporary miniature of empress Eudokia (Note: Previously thought to be Irene Doukaina. The red hair seems to be a later addition.)

Byzantine empress regnant
- 1st reign: 22/23 May – 31 December 1067
- Predecessor: Constantine X Doukas
- Successor: Romanos IV Diogenes
- Junior co-emperors: Michael VII Doukas; Konstantios Doukas
- 2nd reign: 1 October – 1 November 1071
- Predecessor: Romanos IV Diogenes
- Successor: Michael VII Doukas (as sole sovereign)
- Co-sovereign: Michael VII Doukas

Byzantine empress consort
- Tenure: 1059–1067, 1068–1071
- Born: c. 1030
- Died: after 1081
- Spouse: Constantine X Doukas (m. 1049; died 1067) Romanos IV Diogenes (m. 1068; died 1072)
- Issue more...: Michael VII Doukas; Andronikos Doukas; Theodora Doukaina; Konstantios Doukas; Nikephoros Diogenes; Leo Diogenes
- Family: Makrembolites
- Dynasty: Doukid
- Father: John Makrembolites
- Religion: Greek Orthodox

Eudokia Makrembolitissa (Greek: Εὐδοκία Μακρεμβολίτισσα, romanized: Evdokía Makremvolítissa) was a Byzantine empress by her successive marriages to Constantine X Doukas and Romanos IV Diogenes. She acted as ruler with her two sons in 1067, and resigned her rule by marriage to Romanos IV Diogenes. When he was deposed in 1071 she resumed the rule with her son Michael VII, but was soon forced to resign again.

Because she essentially ruled in her own right during her rules and retained the title of empress, several modern scholars consider Eudokia to have been empress regnant in 1067 and 1071.

== Background and early life ==
Eudokia Makrembolitissa was the daughter of John Makrembolites and a maternal niece of Michael I Cerularius, the patriarch of Constantinople, whose sister Keroularie had married Makrembolites. John, who belonged to the aristocracy of Constantinople, allied with Cerularius in 1040 to conspire against Emperor Michael IV, but their plan was stopped soon after. The birth date of Eudokia is unknown, but scholars often place it c. 1030. Some authors give her a lifespan of 1021–1096, but this is not corroborated by other sources.

Eudokia married Constantine X Doukas sometime before his accession in 1059, probably c. 1049, when Constantine was 43 years old. She was Constantine's second wife, as his first one, a daughter of Duke Constantine Dalassenos, died soon after their marriage. By 1059 they already had at least five children: the future Michael VII, an unnamed son who died young, Andronikos Doukas, Anna Doukaina and Theodora Doukaina.

== Empress ==
=== Successor of Constantine X ===
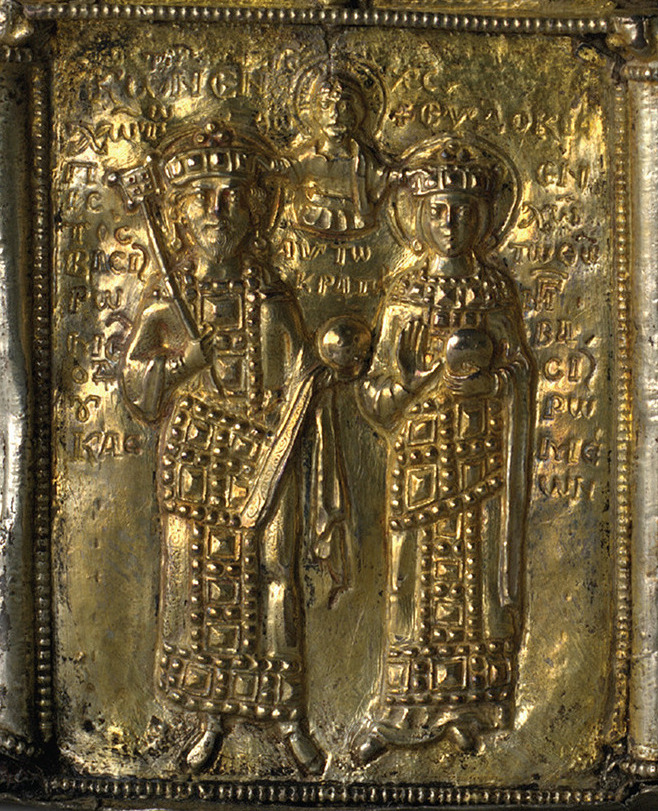
Constantine X and Eudokia in a reliquary of Demetrius of Thessaloniki, by John Autoreianos. (Note: The inscription reads: "Constantine Doukas in Christ the Lord, pious Basileus and Autokrator of the Romans / Eudokia in Christ the Lord, great Basilissa of the Romans.")

Constantine X Doukas was crowned emperor on 23 November 1059, the day after Isaac I Komnenos' abdication. Eudokia was crowned augusta soon after, probably on the same year. They had a fourth son around this time, Konstantios Doukas, who was crowned before his brother Michael, and an other daughter, Zoe.

One inscription on a silver reliquary, showing Constantine X and Eudokia, calls her "Great Empress of the Romans" (megalē basilis tōn Romaiōn), suggesting that she was a co-ruler or successor to Constantine. It was very unusual that, on Constantine X's silver and copper coins, he appeared with only his wife Eudokia, without his sons Michael and Constantios, even though they were co-emperors. On Constantine X's silver coinage, the miliaresion, she and Constantine are together called 'faithful emperors of the Romaioi'. On Constantine X's miliaresion, Eudokia has taken the place to the spectator's right, which is traditionally given to the co-emperor and successor to the throne. Calling her the ruler of the world (κοσμοκράτορ), the dedication poem provides evidence for Eudokia's perception of herself as sharing the empire with her husband Constantine. The inscription from Mesembria testify to the repair of the city wall under Constantine and Eudokia. In the inscriptions concerning the renovation of the walls, the rulers who held the throne in the capacity of emperor at the time of the construction work and following the writing of the inscription are always mentioned.

When Constantine fell ill in October 1066, he appointed caesar John Doukas and patriarch John VIII Xiphilinos as co-regents. Eudokia was meant only to take care of Michael and Konstantios, but Constantine knew that she had larger ambitions. Constantine entrusted all his duties to his wife, Eudokia, and died on 23 May 1067.

=== Supreme ruler of her two sons ===
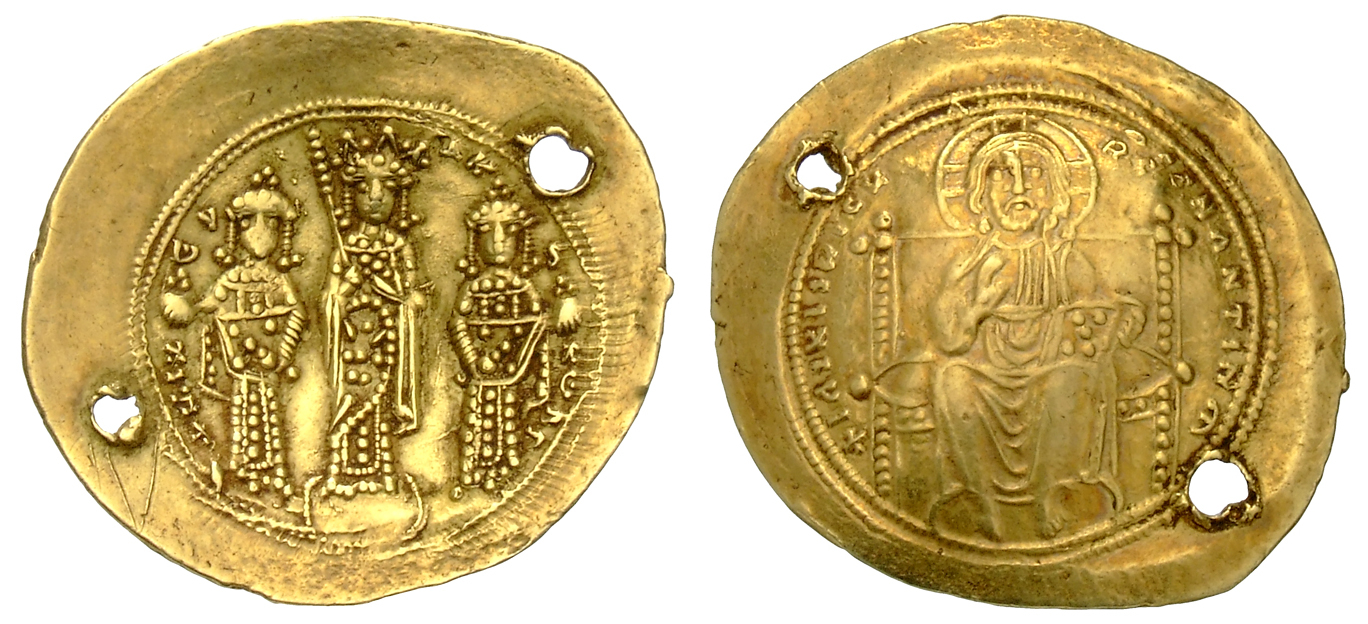
Coin of Eudokia, Michael VII and Konstantios, 1067.

Some historians regard Eudokia as an empress regnant who actually ruled in her own right for seven months, while others consider her as a regent who was the de facto emperor. Some books include her in lists of Byzantine emperors as reigning in 1067 and 1071, while others do not.

All the sources unanimously show Eudokia, not her two sons, as having assumed the supreme power. According to the contemporary Michael Psellos, Eudokia "succeeded [Constantine X] as supreme ruler, she did not hand over the government to others... she assumed control of the whole administration in person. Michael VII was "already long past his boyhood" by this time, but nevertheless "left the whole administration to his mother". Some authors argue that he had some type of mental disability.

Constantine left Michael, Konstantios and Eudokia as co-regents. Eudokia holds the first place in the Hierarchical order, and she alone bears the imperial status. Historian Michael Attaleiates, in order to declare the status of Eudokia after May 1067 and of Zoe and Theodora in April 1042, uses the title of autokrator, precisely because the above were brought to the Byzantine throne with the same legal status as male emperors. Byzantine sources, referring to imperial statutes, usually mention the name of the ruler who issued this decree, and the name of the first-class emperor is never omitted. Eudokia issued a decree determining the distance between buildings being erected, and the inscription of only her name as its publisher presupposes her imperial capacity at the time of the issuance of the legislation. On the coin of 1067, Eudokia is depicted in the midst of her two sons. The arrangement of the figures corresponds to a certain legal relationship between the co-emperors, the senior emperor in the middle and on either side of him the junior co-emperors. On a seal, probably dated between May and December 1067, the inscription reads 'Eudokia, Michael and Constantios, emperors of the Romaioi' and the image displays Eudokia as the central and tallest figure, emphasizing her authority over her sons and co-rulers. Giving her the title 'most pious Augusta', seals, probably from the period of her rule, make no mention of her sons. On the dating clauses of South Italian charters, Eudokia's name always takes precedence over those of her sons, and she is often the only one to receive the imperial title.

Eudokia had sworn on Constantine's deathbed not to remarry, and she even made the oath in the presence of patriarch John VIII Xiphilinos. However, she knew that her position of power could be compromised if she continued to wield power alone. She then chose Romanos IV Diogenes, a general who had great popularity with the army. This decision was quite controversial, as Romanos had been accused of conspiring with the Hungarians shortly before Constantine X's death. Eudokia hoped that his skills and leadership would stop the advance of the Seljuk Turks in the East. On 25 December, Eudokia rewarded Romanos with the titles magistros and stratelates in preparation for his coronation. However, they still needed the approval of the patriarch of Constantinople. According to some sources, Eudokia tricked John VIII into believing that she would marry one of his brothers. John VIII accepted the offer and canceled the oath. The marriage and imperial coronation took place on 1 January 1068, to the surprise of the patriarch and other officials. The texts, speaking about the proclamation of Romanos IV as a new autokrator, do not imply any change to the legal status Eudokia's two sons, because they were simply basileis and not autokratores.

=== Co-guardian of her sons with Romanos IV ===
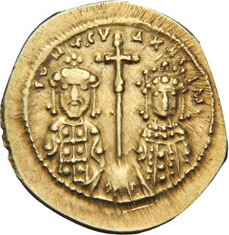
Gold tetarteron of Romanos IV Diogenes and Eudokia.

With her new husband's assistance, Eudokia was able to dispel the impending danger. She had two sons with Romanos IV, Nikephoros and Leo. Another of Eudokia and Constantine's sons, Andronikos Doukas, was also made co-emperor by Romanos IV, although he had been excluded from power by his own father, mother, and brothers. He was probably crowned too in 1068, although he is ignored by contemporary chronicles.

While Romanos appears on the reverse of his own coinage, where Christ is shown blessing the marriage of Eudokia and Romanos, Michael and his brothers occupy the important obverse side, showing Romanos ranks after Eudokia's sons. A tetarteron pattern depicts Eudokia with the scepter and the title of basilissa on the obverse outranking Romanos with the akakia and the title of despotes on the reverse, a contrast claiming too much in favor of the empress. On coins, the title of basilissa is used by only the empresses who assumed the throne: Irene, Zoe, Theodora, and Eudokia Makrembolitissa. The struck tetarteron shows Romanos and Eudokia, holding between them the globe, a gesture symbolizing that they rule the world together. A seal, dated to early 1068, link Romanos and Eudokia as co-rulers with the title 'Romanos and Eudokia emperors of the Romaioi'.

According to Michael Psellos, Eudokia explicitly referred to Romanos as "a subject, not a ruler." Romanos, however, soon started to act independently of her, even starting to resent her. Discontent was also shared by a faction of the Senate and army, with John Doukas at the head.

=== Co-sovereign with Michael VII ===
On 26 August 1071, Romanos IV faced Alp Arslan, sultan of the Seljuk Empire, at the decisive Battle of Manzikert. The Byzantine army was destroyed and the emperor himself was captured, partly because of the treachery of general Andronikos, John Doukas's son. The news reached Constantinople a few days later, causing much shock in the populace. The Senate declared Romanos IV deposed and proclaimed Eudokia and Michael VII as joint rulers, because Psellos had proposed their joint rule to resolve the dispute over whether power should be handed over to Michael VII or Eudokia. Some sources state that Eudokia was already planning on deposing her husband, but this is very unlikely.

Alexios II, for whom Maria was regent, was simply basileus, but upon his father Manuel I's death, he was immediately proclaimed autokrator. On the other hand, Michael VII continued to be referred to simply as basileus after his father Constantine X's death and was only proclaimed autokrator in 1071, reflecting how Eudokia's legal status after her husband's death differed from Maria's. On a tetarteron, dated to 1071 during the co-rule of Eudokia and Michael VII, there are images of the two with the inscription 'Eudokia and Michael, emperors' (Εὐδοκία καὶ Μιχαήλ βασιλεῖς), signifying that Eudokia occupies the place of honor on the right.

The new regime only lasted one month, (Note: The joint rule of Eudokia and Michael VII is dated differently by various scholars: Muralt dates it in 24 September – 24 October 1071, Schreiner dates it in 1 October – 1 November 1071, and Polemis dates it in late September – late October 1071.) when Eudokia's opposition became strong enough to depose her, especially after news of Romanos release arrived at the capital. Michael VII was then proclaimed sole autokrator by John Doukas, who forced Eudokia to retire to a monastery as a nun.

== Later life ==
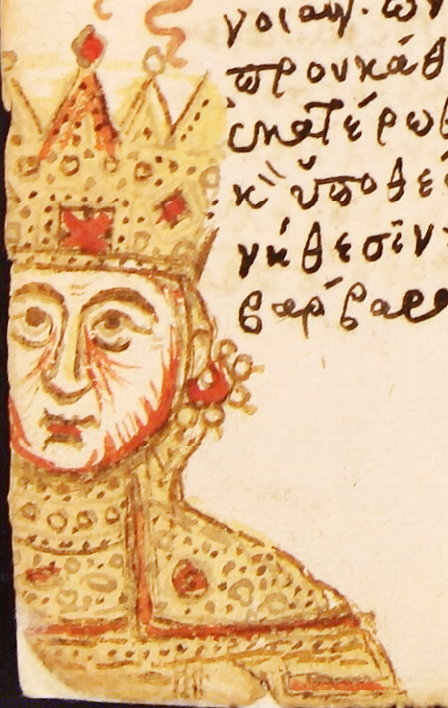
15th-century portrait of Eudokia, from the Mutinensis gr. 122

Eudokia continued to be influential even after her exile in 1071. Soon after her deposition, she allied with Anna Dalassene, a sister-in-law of Isaac I Komnenos who had also been exiled, to restore Romanos IV and depose John Doukas. However, Doukas soon fell from grace as a result of the schemes of eunuch Nikephoritzes, who was close to the Komnenos family. Eudokia later performed a memorable funeral and burial for Romanos IV, who died on 4 August 1072.

After Michael VII was deposed in 1078 by Nikephoros III Botaneiates, Eudokia was recalled to Constantinople by the new emperor, who offered to marry her. This plan did not come to pass, mainly due to the opposition of John Doukas, who returned to power after Nikephoritzes's exile. However, Nikephoros still sent her many rewards and gifts of gratitude. Her date of death is unknown, but it was sometime after the accession of Alexios I Komnenos in 1081. Her last known action is the adoption of one of the cousins of Patriarch Michael I Cerularius.

Attributed to Eudokia is a dictionary of history and mythology, called Ἰωνιά (i.e., Collection or Bed of Violets). It is prefaced by an address to her husband, Romanos Diogenes, and the work is described as "a collection of genealogies of gods, heroes, and heroines, of their metamorphoses, and of the fables and stories respecting them found in the ancients; containing also notices of various philosophers". However, the book is now thought to be a modern (16th-century) compilation, falsely attributed to Eudokia, and compiled by the counterfeiter Constantine Paleocappa c. 1540. The sources from which the work was compiled include Diogenes Laërtius and the Suda.

== Issue ==
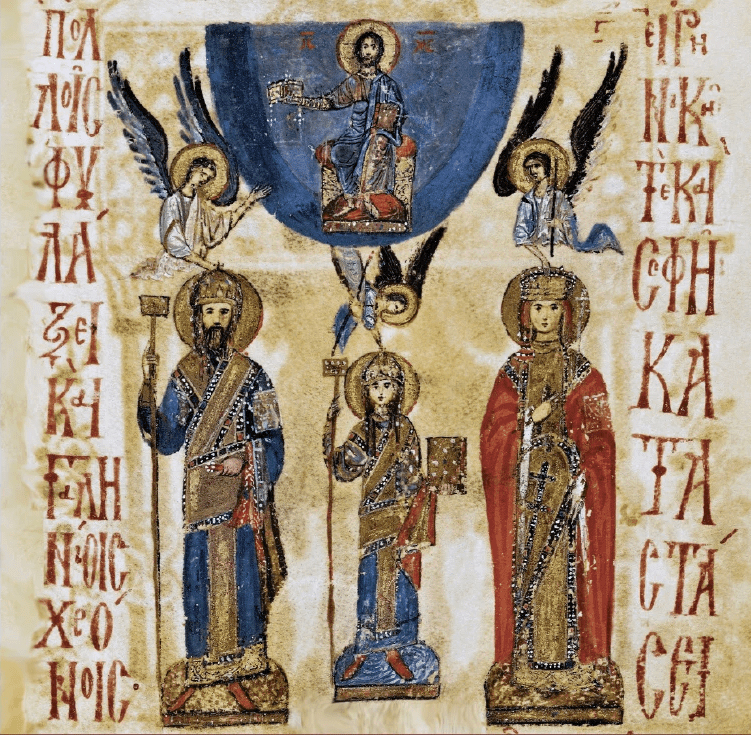
Miniature of Constantine X and Eudokia alongside their son and co-emperor Michael VII Doukas.

By her first husband, Eudokia had seven children, four sons and three daughters:

- Michael VII Doukas, co-emperor from 1060 and senior emperor after 1071.
- A son who died in infancy.
- Anne Doukaina, nun.
- Andronikos Doukas, co-emperor from 1068 to 1078.
- Theodora Doukaina, who married Domenico Selvo, Doge of Venice.
- Konstantios Doukas, co-emperor from 1060 to 1078, died in battle with the Normans in 1081.
- Zoe Doukaina, who married Adrianos Komnenos, a brother of Emperor Alexios I Komnenos. They had a son, Alexios, and two daughters, maybe named Anne and Alexia.

By her second husband, she had two sons, most likely twins:

- Nikephoros Diogenes, blinded by order of Alexios I Comnenus on charges of treason.
- Leo Diogenes, died in battle.

== Bibliography ==
Primary sources

- Psellos, Michael. Cronographia. Vol. 7.

Secondary sources

- Cameron, Averil (2009). The Byzantines. Wiley. ISBN 9781405198332.
- Evans, Helen C.; Wixom, William D. (1997). The glory of Byzantium: art and culture of the Middle Byzantine era. New York: Metropolitan Museum of Art. ISBN 9780810965072.
- Finlay, George (1877) [1854]. "Regency of Eudocia (1067)". History of the Byzantine and Greek Empires from 1057–1453. William Blackwood & Sonspages. pp. 24–36.
- Garland, Lynda (2002). "Eudokia Makrembolitissa". Byzantine Empresses: Woman and Power in Byzantium. Routledge. pp. 168–179. ISBN 9781134756384.
- Grierson, Philip (1973). "Eudocia Macrembolitissa". Catalogue of the Byzantine Coins in the Dumbarton Oaks Collection and in the Whittemore Collection: Leo III to Nicephorus III, 717–1081. Vol. 3. Washington D.C.: Dumbarton Oaks. pp. 779–784. ISBN 9780884020455.
- Jeffreys, Michael, ed. (2016). "Eudokia Makrembolitissa". Prosopography of the Byzantine World. King's College London. ISBN 978-1-908951-20-5.
- Hill, Barbara (2014). Imperial Women in Byzantium 1025-1204 : Power, Patronage and Ideology. Hoboken: Taylor and Francis. ISBN 978-1-317-88466-8. OCLC 881417376.
- Kazhdan, Alexander, ed. (1991). "Eudokia Makrembolitissa". The Oxford Dictionary of Byzantium. Oxford and New York: Oxford University Press. ISBN 0-19-504652-8.
- Haldon, John (2005). The Palgrave Atlas of Byzantine History. New York: Palgrave Macmillan. ISBN 978-0230243644.
- Kalavrezou-Maxeiner, Ioli (1977). "Eudokia Makrembolitissa and the Romanos Ivory". Dumbarton Oaks Papers. 31: 307–325. doi:10.2307/1291410. ISSN 0070-7546. JSTOR 1291410.
- Kaldellis, Anthony (2023). The New Roman Empire: A History of Byzantium. New York: Oxford University Press. ISBN 978-0197549322.
- Oikonomidès, Nicolas (1963). "Le serment de l'impératrice Eudocie (1067) : un épisode de l'histoire dynastique de Byzance". Revue des études byzantines. 21: 101–128. doi:10.3406/rebyz.1963.1302.
- Sághy, Marianne; Robert, Ousterhout (2019), Piroska and the Pantokrator, Central European University Press, ISBN 9789633862971
- Spatharakis, Ioannis (1976), The Portrait in Byzantine Illuminated Manuscripts, Brill, ISBN 9789633862971
- Schreiner, Peter (1975). Die byzantinischen Kleinchronike [Byzantine small chronicles]. Corpus Fontium Historiae Byzantinae. Vienna: ÖAW. ISBN 978-3-7001-0206-9.
- Treadgold, Warren (1997). A History of the Byzantine State and Society. Stanford, California: Stanford University Press. ISBN 0-8047-2630-2.
- Vratimos, Antonios (2003). "Eudokia Makrembolitissa: was she implicated in the removal of her husband, Romanos IV Diogenes, from power?". Revue des études byzantines. 71: 277–284. doi:10.3406/rebyz.2013.4998.
- McLachlan, Sean (2004). Byzantium: An Illustrated History. Hippocrene Books. ISBN 0-7818-1033-7.
- Dorandi, Tiziano (2013). "Introduction". Diogenes Laertius: Lives of Eminent Philosophers. Cambridge University Press. pp. 7–9. ISBN 978-0521886819.
- This article incorporates text from a publication now in the public domain: Chisholm, Hugh, ed. (1911). "Eudocia Macrembolitissa". Encyclopædia Britannica. Vol. 9 (11th ed.). Cambridge University Press.
- Smith, William, ed. (1870), "Eudocia Augusta Macrembolis", Dictionary of Greek and Roman Biography and Mythology, vol. 2, p. 80

Eudokia Makrembolitissa Doukid dynasty Born: c. 1030 Died: after 1081
Regnal titles
Preceded by Constantine X	Byzantine empress regnant 23 May – 31 December 1067	Succeeded by Romanos IV
Preceded by Romanos IV	Byzantine empress regnant 1 October – 1 November 1071 with Michael VII	Succeeded by Michael VII as sole sovereign
Royal titles
Preceded by Catherine of Bulgaria	Byzantine empress consort 23 November 1059 – 23 May 1067 and 1 January 1068 – 1 October 1071	Succeeded by Maria of Alania
