= Makrembolites =

Byzantine aristocratic name

Makrembolites or Macrembolites (Greek: Μακρεμβολίτης), feminine form Makrembolitissa or Macrembolitissa (Μακρεμβολίτισσα), was the name of a prominent Byzantine aristocratic family. It was active particularly in the 11th–13th centuries, when it produced several high-ranking members of the civil bureaucracy, and one empress, Eudokia Makrembolitissa.

== History ==
The Makrembolitai apparently originated in the Byzantine capital, Constantinople: the first attested member of the family lived there, and the family name seems to be derived from the Makros Embolos, the "Long Portico", a district of the city.

The first influential members of the family was John Makrembolites, a brother-in-law to the Patriarch Michael I Keroularios. His daughter, Eudokia Makrembolitissa, married Constantine Doukas and became Empress when the latter ascended the throne as Constantine X (r. 1059–1068); after his death she ruled as regent for her under-age sons until she re-married to Romanos IV Diogenes (r. 1068–1071).

The family remained prominent under the Komnenoi as high-ranking civilian functionaries: Theodore Makrembolites was bishop of Methymna in the early 12th century; Demetrios Makrembolites served as envoy to the Second Crusade in 1146–47; John Makrembolites was megas droungarios tes viglas in 1157; Eumathios Makrembolites was Eparch of the City later in the century; and Theophylact of Ohrid records another member of the family as archon of Prespa. The late 12th-century writer Eustathios Makrembolites, sometimes equated with the contemporary Eparch, is known for his prose romance On Hysmine and Hysminias, which introduced several innovations in Byzantine literature. Of the later members of the family the most prominent is the mid-14th century writer Alexios Makrembolites, author of Dialogue Between the Rich and the Poor.
