= Gallipoli (disambiguation) =

Gallipoli is a peninsula in the European side of northwestern Turkey, named after a town on its shore now called Gelibolu.

Gallipoli may also refer to:

== Places ==
=== Italy ===
- Gallipoli, Apulia, a coastal town in southern Italy

=== Other ===
- Gallipoli Drive, a road which intersects Grand Junction Road, Adelaide, Australia, named after the peninsula
- Gallipoli Underpass, a part of South Road, Adelaide

== Arts and entertainment ==
=== Film and television ===
- Gallipoli (1981 film), about the Gallipoli campaign, directed by Peter Weir
- Gallipoli (2005 film), about the Gallipoli campaign, written and directed by Tolga Örnek
- Gallipoli (miniseries), a 2015 miniseries based on Les Carlyon's book

=== Literature ===
- Gallipoli, a book by Les Carlyon about the Gallipoli campaign, which was adapted as an Australian TV miniseries
- Gallipoli, a book by John Masefield about the Gallipoli campaign
- Gallipoli, a book by Alan Moorehead about the Gallipoli campaign

=== Music ===
- Gallipoli (album), a 2019 album by Beirut
  - "Gallipoli" (song), the title track of the album

=== Video games ===
- Gallipoli (video game), a first-person shooter video game set on the Middle Eastern front of World War I

== Other uses ==
- Gallipoli campaign or Battle of Gallipoli, which took place on the Gallipoli peninsula during World War I
- A.S.D. Gallipoli Football 1909, a football team based in Gallipoli, Apulia
- Gallipoli Art Prize, an Australian prize

== See also ==
- Callipolis (disambiguation)
- Gallipolis
