= Erastus of Scepsis =

4th-century BC Greek philosopher

Erastus of Scepsis (/ɪˈræstəs/; Greek: Ἔραστος Σκήψιος) and his brother Coriscus were students of Plato. He was also a friend of Aristotle.

Scepsis is located about fifty kilometers from Assos in Asia Minor, to which Aristotle and Xenocrates traveled after Plato's death.
