= Lyco of Troas =

Ancient Greek philosopher

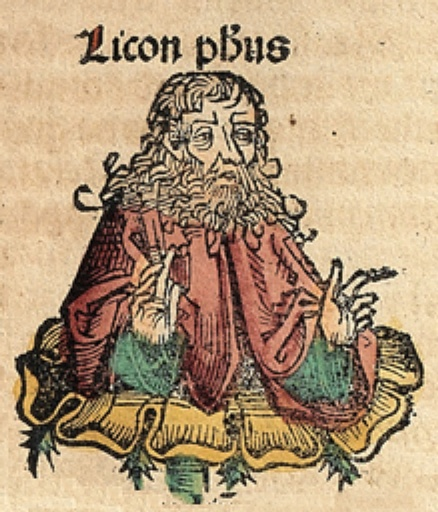
Lyco of Troas, depicted as a medieval scholar in the Nuremberg Chronicle

Lyco of Troas (/ˈlaɪkoʊ/; Ancient Greek: Λύκων, romanized: Lýkōn, gen.: Λύκωνος; c. 299 – c. 225 BC), son of Astyanax, was a Peripatetic philosopher and the disciple of Strato, whom he succeeded as the head of the Peripatetic school, c. 269 BC; he held that post for more than forty-four years. He is also said to have studied under Panthoides the dialectician.

== Life ==
Lyco resided at Pergamon, under the patronage of Eumenes I and Attalus I, from whom Antiochus II Theos in vain sought to entice him. On several occasions, his counsel was of great service to the Athenians. He was celebrated for his eloquence. According to Diogenes Laertius, Antigonus of Carystus stated that the beauty of his sayings were bound to him, just as the beauty and sweetness of an apple are bound to it, without the possibility of being transferred to anything else. He was also a recognized educator of boys, a facet of his approach is demonstrated in his saying that "it was fit for boys to be harnessed with modesty and rivalry, as much as for horses to be equipped with a spur and a bridle". Hermippus is said to have noted him for his neatness of dress and delicacy of garments. He paid great attention to the body as well as to the mind, and, constantly practicing athletic exercises and competing in athletic events, was exceedingly healthy and robust. Nevertheless, he died of gout at the age of 74. He was a bitter rival of the Peripatetic philosopher Hieronymus of Rhodes. Lyco's most notable student in the Peripatetic school was Aristo of Ceos who may have succeeded him as head of the school.

== Writings ==
Among the writings of Lyco was probably a work On Characters (similar to the work of Theophrastus), a fragment of which is preserved by Rutilius Lupus, though the title of the book is not mentioned by any ancient writer. It appears from Cicero and Clement of Alexandria, that he wrote on the boundaries of good and evil (Latin: De Finibus). Apuleius suggests that he wrote a work on the nature of animals. Additionally, Lyco's will was claimed to have been found by Laertius and is quoted by him in its entirety.

== Sayings ==
Diogenes Laertius attributed an additional number of sayings to Lyco of Troas by which his aforementioned eloquence was demonstrated:

- “A damsel, who, for want of a dowry, goes beyond the seasonable age, is a heavy burden to her father.”
- "They were accusing themselves, showing by a prayer which could not possibly be accomplished, their misplaced repentance for their idleness." (About those who regret that they had not learnt when they had the opportunity, and who now wished that they had done so).
- "Those who deliberated without coming to a right conclusion, erred in their calculations, like men who investigate a correct nature by an incorrect standard, or who look at a face in disturbed water, or a distorted mirror."
- "Many men go in pursuit of the crown to be won in the forum, but few or none seek to attain the one to be gained at the Olympic games."

== Sources ==
- Dorandi, Tiziano (1999). "Chapter 2: Chronology". In Algra, Keimpe; et al. (eds.). The Cambridge History of Hellenistic Philosophy. Cambridge: Cambridge University Press. p. 53. ISBN 9780521250283.
- Laërtius, Diogenes. "The Peripatetics: Lyco" . Lives of the Eminent Philosophers. Vol. 1:5. Translated by Hicks, Robert Drew (Two volume ed.). Loeb Classical Library.
