= Critolaus =

Ancient Greek philosopher

Critolaus (/kraɪtoʊˈleɪəs/; Greek: Κριτόλαος Kritolaos; c. 200 – c. 118 BC) of Phaselis was a Greek philosopher of the Peripatetic school. He was one of three philosophers sent to Rome in 155 BC (the other two being Carneades and Diogenes of Babylon), where their doctrines fascinated the citizens, but frightened the more conservative statesmen. None of his writings survive. He was interested in rhetoric and ethics, and considered pleasure to be an evil. He maintained the Aristotelian doctrine of the eternity of the world, and of the human race in general, directing his arguments against the Stoics.

== Life ==
He was born in Phaselis, a Greek colony in Lycia, c. 200 BC, and studied philosophy at Athens under Aristo of Ceos, and became one of the leaders of the Peripatetic school by his eminence as an orator, a scholar and a moralist. There has been considerable discussion as to whether he was the immediate successor of Aristo, but the evidence is confused.

The great reputation which Critolaus enjoyed at Athens, as a philosopher, an orator, and a statesman, induced the Athenians to send him to Rome in 155 BC, together with Carneades and Diogenes the Stoic, to obtain a remission of the fine of 500 talents which the Romans had imposed upon Athens for the destruction of Oropus. They were successful in the object for which they came; and the embassy excited the greatest interest at Rome. Not only the Roman youth, but the most illustrious men in the state, such as Scipio Africanus, Laelius, Furius, and others, came to listen to their discourses. The novelty of their doctrines seemed to the Romans of the old school to be fraught with such danger to the morals of the citizens, that Cato induced the senate to send them away from Rome as quickly as possible. Gellius describes his arguments as "elegant and polished" (Latin: scita et teretia). We have no further information respecting the life of Critolaus. He lived upwards of eighty-two years, but died c. 118 BC. By the time Licinius Crassus arrived at Athens c. 111 BC, he found Critolaus' pupil Diodorus of Tyre at the head of the Peripatetic school.

== Philosophy ==
Critolaus seems to have paid particular attention to rhetoric, though he considered it, like Aristotle, not as an art, but rather as a matter of practice. Cicero speaks in high terms of his eloquence. Next to Rhetoric, Critolaus seems to have given his chief attention to the study of moral philosophy, and to have made some additions to Aristotle's system. In general, he deviated very little from the philosophy of the founder of the Peripatetic school, though in some respects he went beyond his predecessors. For example, he held that pleasure is an evil, and definitely maintained that the soul consists of aether. The end of existence was to him the general perfection of the natural life, including the goods of the soul and the body, and also external goods. Cicero says in the Tusculanae Quaestiones that the goods of the soul entirely outweighed for him the other goods (Latin: tantum propendere illam bonorum animi lancem).

Further, he defended against the Stoics the Peripatetic doctrine of the eternity of the world and the indestructibility of the human race. There is no observed change in the natural order of things; humankind recreates itself in the same manner according to the capacity given by Nature, and the various ills to which it is heir, though fatal to individuals, do not avail to modify the whole. Just as it is absurd to suppose that humans are merely earth-born, so the possibility of their ultimate destruction is inconceivable. The world, as the manifestation of eternal order, must itself be immortal.

A Critolaus is mentioned by Plutarch as the author of a work on Epirus, and of another entitled Phenomena; and Aulus Gellius also speaks of an historical writer of this name. Whether the historian is the same as the Peripatetic philosopher, cannot be determined. A grammarian Critolaus is mentioned in the Etymologicum Magnum.
