= Orbius =

Orbius was a Roman general, who defeated the supporters of Mithridates VI (reigned 120–63 BC) at Delos. The battle was part of the Mithridatic Wars (88 – 63 BC).

== Battle of Delos ==
He heard that the Athenian soldiers, under the command of Apellicon of Teos, had been placed in a very careless manner on the side of Delos, leaving all of the back of the island unguarded. He led his force of Romans and Delians against the Athenians on that moonless night, falling on Apellicon and his soldiers, who were all asleep and drunk, he cut the Athenians and all those who were in the army with them to pieces, like so many sheep, to the number of six hundred, and he took four hundred alive.

Apellicon fled away without being perceived, and came to Delos; and Orbius seeing that many of those who fled with him had escaped to the farmhouses round about, burnt them in the houses, houses and all; and he destroyed by fire also all the engines for besieging cities together with the Helepolis which Apellicon had made when he came to Delos. Orbius erected in that place a trophy and an altar.
