= Boethus of Sidon (Peripatetic) =

1st-century BC Greek philosopher

Boethus of Sidon (Ancient Greek: Βόηθος, romanized: Bóēthos; c. 75 – c. 10 BC) was a Peripatetic philosopher from Sidon, who lived towards the end of the 1st century BC. None of his work has been preserved and the complete collection of quotations and paraphrases appeared first in 2020.

== Biography ==
As Boethus was a disciple of Andronicus of Rhodes, he must have travelled at an early age to Rome and Athens, in which cities Andronicus is known to have taught. Strabo, who mentions him and his brother Diodotus among the celebrated persons of Sidon, speaks of him at the same time as his own teacher (or fellow pupil) in Peripatetic philosophy. Among his works, all of which are now lost, there was one on the nature of the soul, and also a commentary on Aristotle's Categories, which is mentioned by Ammonius in his commentary on the same work of Aristotle. Ammonius quotes also an opinion of Boethus concerning the study of the works of Aristotle, viz. that the student should begin with the Physics, whereas Andronicus had maintained that the beginning should be made with the Logic writings of Aristotle.

According to Giovanni Reale, in The Schools of the Imperial Age, Boethus believed that ‘substance’ was ‘matter’ – that it was the composite of being, and not the individual form of being. Thus “form falls outside of the category of substance and enters into the scope of other categories”. The significance of this is that individuality is not only how we understand and interpret reality, but is actually the basic nature of that reality. That 'true reality' was not some universal substance, but consisted of individual forms.

Similarly, in ethics, Boethus declared that “the original goal (the proton oikeion) towards which we tend is ourselves in relation to ourselves. In agreement with that view, he says that we do not love anyone in preference to ourselves and finally that we only love others in reference to ourselves”.

== Bibliography ==
- Riccardo Chiaradonna, Marwan Rashed (eds.), Boéthos de Sidon – Exégète d’Aristote et philosophe, Commentaria in Aristotelem Graeca et Byzantina, Series Academica, Berlin, De Gruyter, 2020, ISBN 978-3-11-069982-1
- Michael J. Griffin, Aristotle's Categories in the Early Roman Empire, Oxford, Oxford University Press, 2015, Chapter 6: "Boethus of Sidon", pp. 177-199.
- Pamela Huby, "An Excerpt from Boethus of Sidon’s Commentary on the Categories?", Classical Quarterly, 31, 1981, pp. 398-409.
- Marwan Rashed, "Boethus’ Aristotelian Ontology", in Malcolm Schofield (ed.), Aristotle, Plato, and Pythagoreanism in the First Century BCE, Cambridge, Cambridge University Press, 2013, pp. 53-77.
