= Apellicon of Teos =

Ancient Greek philosopher in Athens

Apellicon (Greek: Ἀπελλικῶν; died c. 84 BC), a wealthy man from Teos, afterwards an Athenian citizen, was a famous book collector of the 1st century BC.

He not only spent large sums in the acquisition of his library, but stole original documents from the archives of Athens and other cities of Greece. Being detected, he fled in order to escape punishment, but returned when Athenion (or Aristion), a bitter opponent of the Romans, had made himself tyrant of the city with the aid of Mithradates. Athenion sent him with some troops to Delos, to plunder the treasures of the temple, but he showed little military capacity. He was surprised by the Romans under the command of Orobius (or Orbius), and only saved his life by flight. He died a little later, probably in 84 BC.

== Library ==
Apellicon's chief pursuit was the collection of rare and important books. He purchased from the family of Neleus of Scepsis in the Troad manuscripts of the works of Aristotle and Theophrastus (including their libraries), which had been given to Neleus by Theophrastus himself, whose pupil Neleus had been. They had been concealed in a cellar to prevent their falling into the hands of the book-collecting princes of Pergamon, and were in a very dilapidated condition. Apellicon was a lover of books rather than a philosopher; trying to restore the damaged copies he made new ones, filling up the lacunae incorrectly, and published them full of mistakes. In 84 BC Sulla removed Apellicon's library to Rome. Here the manuscripts were handed over to the grammarian Tyrannion of Amisus, who took copies of them, on the basis of which the peripatetic philosopher Andronicus of Rhodes prepared an edition of Aristotle's works.

Apellicon of Teos was a very rich individual who had bought up the library of Aristotle amongst many other books when he was a Peripatetic philosopher — other sources inform us that he was a mint magistrate under Athenion, tyrant of Athens. Apellicon, furthermore, secretly acquired — that is, stole — the original documents from the Athenian Metroon, the building that housed the city’s public documents. Particularly significant in this passage is the precedence given to Aristotle’s books, one that eclipses other writing and documents acquired by the Peripatetic. Considering that Apellicon appears from sources to have been something of a rogue, there is reason to believe that he may have fabricated the account of how he acquired the library in order to enhance its reputation.

Apellicon's library contained a remarkable old copy of the Iliad. He is said to have published a biography of Aristotle, in which the calumnies of other biographers were refuted.
