= Peripatetic axiom =

Philosophical principle quoted by Thomas Aquinas

The Peripatetic axiom is that "nothing is in the intellect that was not first in the senses" (Latin: Nihil est in intellectu quod non sit prius in sensu). It is found in De veritate (q. 2 a. 3 arg. 19) by Thomas Aquinas, and it is essentially a declaration of empiricism: the philosophical view that true knowledge comes from sensory experiences and observations.

Aquinas adopted this principle from Aristotle's Peripatetic school of Greek philosophy, established the Lyceum of ancient Athens. Aquinas argued that the existence of God could be proved by reasoning from sense data. He used a variation on the Aristotelian notion of the "active intellect" (Latin: intellectus agens), which he interpreted as the ability to abstract universal meanings from particular empirical data.
