= Coriscus of Scepsis =

Student of Plato

Coriscus of Scepsis (/kɔːˈrɪskəs/; Greek: Κορίσκος Σκήψιος) and his brother Erastus were students of Plato. He was also a friend of Aristotle. Coriscus' son Neleus is mentioned as inheriting Aristotle's library.

Scepsis is located about fifty kilometers from Assos in Asia Minor, to which Aristotle and Xenocrates traveled after Plato's death.
