= Constantine Paleocappa =

Byzantine scribe, forger, and counterfeiter

Constantine Paleocappa was a 16th-century Byzantine scribe, forger, and counterfeiter.

Paleocappa is believed to be the true author of the work known as the Collection or Bed of Violets (Ἰωνιά), and historically attributed to the 11th-century Byzantine empress Eudokia Makrembolitissa.

Paleocappa is believed to have fabricated this text from material in the Suda, Diogenes Laërtius's Lives and Opinions of Eminent Philosophers, the writings of Varinus Phavorinus Camera, Lucius Annaeus Cornutus, and Palaephatus.

Paleocappa also produced a forgery of some liturgical texts attributed to Proclus of Constantinople, as well as a 13th-century polemic against the Jews attributed to "Thaddaios Pelusiotes", which was based on an actual 14th-century polemic by Matthew Blastares.
