= Hermippus of Smyrna =

3rd-century BC Greek biographer and philosopher

Hermippus of Smyrna (Greek: Ἕρμιππος ὁ Σμυρναῖος) was a Greek grammarian and peripatetic philosopher, surnamed by the ancient writers "the Callimachian" (Greek: ό Καλλιμάχειος), from which it may be inferred that he was a disciple of Callimachus about the middle of the 3rd century BC, while the fact of his having written about the life of Chrysippus proves that he lived to about the end of the century. His writings seem to have been of very great importance and value. They are repeatedly referred to by the ancient writers, under many titles, of which, however, most, if not all, seem to have been chapters of his great biographical work, which is often quoted under the title of Lives (Bioi). The work contained the biographies of a great many ancient figures, including orators, poets, historians, and philosophers. It contained the earliest known biography of Aristotle, as well as philosophers such as Pythagoras, Empedocles, Heraclitus, Democritus, Zeno, Socrates, Plato, Antisthenes, Diogenes, Stilpo, Epicurus, Theophrastus, Heraclides, Demetrius Phalereus, and Chrysippus. The work has been lost, but many later Lives extensively quote it.

Josephus and Origen cite Hermippus to argue that Pythagoras owed a debt to Judaism.
