= Aristo of Ceos =

3rd-century BC Greek philosopher

Aristo of Ceos (/əˈrɪstoʊ/; Ancient Greek: Ἀρίστων ὁ Κεῖος; fl. c. 225 BC) was a Peripatetic philosopher and a native of the island of Ceos. His birthplace was the town of Ioulis. He is not to be confused with Aristo of Chios, a Stoic philosopher of the mid 3rd century BC.

Aristo was a pupil of Lyco, who had succeeded Strato as the head of the Peripatetic school from about 269 BC. After the death of Lyco (c. 225), Aristo probably succeeded him as the head of the school. Although Aristo was, according to Cicero, a man of taste and elegance, he was deficient in gravity and energy, which prevented his writings from acquiring the popularity they otherwise deserved. This may have been one of the causes of their neglect and loss.

Judging from the scant extant fragments, his philosophical views seem to have followed his master Lyco pretty closely. Diogenes Laërtius, after enumerating the works of Aristo of Chios, says that Panaetius and Sosicrates attributed all these works, except the letters, to Aristo of Ceos. Whether this attribution is correct we are unable to determine. At any rate, one of those works, Conversations on Love, is repeatedly ascribed to Aristo of Ceos by Athenaeus. One work of Aristo not mentioned by Diogenes Laërtius was entitled Lyco in gratitude to his master. There are also two epigrams in the Greek Anthology which are commonly attributed to Aristo of Ceos, though there is no evidence for the validity of their authorship.
