= Callipolis (Caria) =

Ancient city of Caria

Coordinates: 36°59′29″N 28°16′20″E

Callipolis or Kallipolis (Ancient Greek: Καλλίπολις) was a town of ancient Caria.

Its site is located near Gelibolu, Asiatic Turkey.
