= Theodora Doukaina Selvo =

Byzantine princess and dogaressa

Theodora Doukaina (Greek: Θεοδώρα Δούκαινα, romanized: Theodṓra Doúkaina), renamed Anna (1058– after 1075), was a Byzantine princess and dogaressa.

== Life ==
Born in Constantinople, Theodora Doukaina was the second daughter of Byzantine emperor Constantine X Doukas by his second wife, Eudokia Makrembolitissa. After 1071 she became the wife of Domenico Selvo, Doge of Venice, who received the title of protoproedros at the occasion.

As she is mentioned as alive in the work of Michael Psellos (1075), it is assumed she died after this last date. It is not known if she had children, and she is not mentioned otherwise.

== Confusion with Maria Argyropoulina ==
Peter Damian, the Cardinal Bishop of Ostia, wrote a chapter entitled "De Veneti ducis uxore quae prius nimium delicata, demum toto corpore computruit" ("Of the Venetian Doge's wife, whose body, after her excessive delicacy, entirely rotted away.") about an unnamed Byzantine princess whose manners he considered scandalously lavish and which brought to her a horrible death as a divine punishment.

This woman has been mistakenly (since Damian died 1072) identified with Domenico Selvo's wife by later Venetian chroniclers (incl. Andrea Dandolo and Marino Sanuto the Younger) followed afterwards by various modern authors; however since the work in which Damianus' chapter is contained is dated ca 1059 it refers probably to Maria Argyropoulina who had died a half century before.

== Bibliography ==
- Polemis, Demetrios I. (1968). The Doukai: A Contribution to Byzantine Prosopography. London: The Athlone Press.
- Hodgson, Francis Cotterell. The Early History of Venice: From the Foundation to the Conquest of Constantinople, A.D. 1204. G. Allen, 1901. pp. 191–192 ()
- Nicol, Donald M. (1988). Byzantium and Venice: A Study in Diplomatic and Cultural Relations. Cambridge: Cambridge University Press. pp. 46–47. ISBN 0-521-34157-4.

=== Works confusing Theodora and Maria ===
- Henisch, Bridget Ann (1976), Fast and Feast: Food in Medieval Society ISBN 0-271-01230-7
- Staley, Edgcumbe (c1910), The Dogaressas of Venice

Vacant Unconfirmed predecessor Title last held by Grimelda of Hungary	Dogaressa of Venice; 1075–1083	Succeeded by Cornella Bembo
