= Dicaearchus =

4th-century BC Greek philosopher and geographer

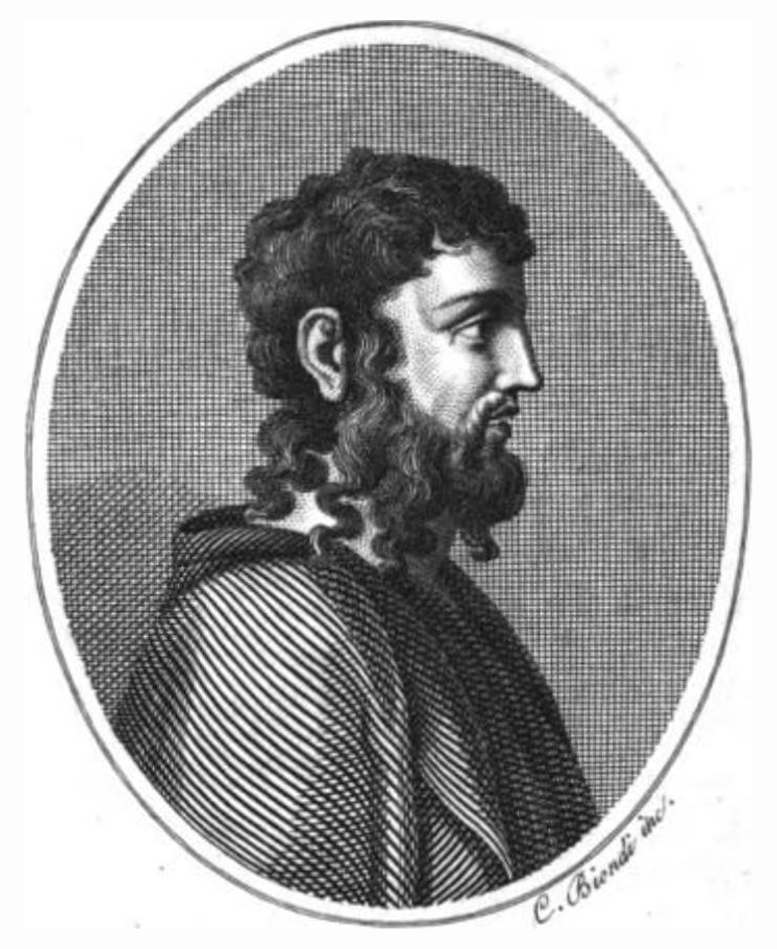
Portrait of Dicaearchus made in 1817

Dicaearchus of Messana (/ˌdɪkeɪˈɑːrkəs ... məˈsɑːnə/; Ancient Greek: Δικαίαρχος Dikaiarkhos; c. 370/350 – c. post 323 BC), also written Dikaiarchos (/ˈdɪkaɪɑːrk/), was a Greek philosopher, geographer and author. Dicaearchus was a student of Aristotle in the Lyceum. Very little of his work remains extant. He wrote on geography and the history of Greece, of which his most important work was his Life of Greece. Although modern scholars often consider him a pioneer in the field of cartography, this is based on a misinterpretation of a reference in Cicero to Dicaearchus's tabulae, which does not refer to any maps made by Dicaearchus but is a pun on account books and refers to Dicaearchus's Descent into the Sanctuary of Trophonius. He also wrote books on ancient Greek poets, philosophy and politics.

== Life ==
He was the son of one Pheidias, and born at Messana in Sicily, Magna Graecia, though he passed part of his life in Greece, and especially in Athens and the Peloponnesus. He also travelled to make his measurements of mountains. He was a disciple of Aristotle and a friend of Aristoxenus (a letter written to him is attested in Cicero). Eighteenth- and early nineteenth-century scholarship often considered him a friend of Theophrastus as well, but this is based on the reference to a man named Theophrastus in the spurious Description of Greece, which is transmitted under Dicaearchus's name but actually consists of excerpts from a geographic poem written by Dionysius, son of Calliphon, and from a prose periegesis of Greece, written by Heraclides Criticus. It is uncertain when Dicaearchus died. The only certain terminus post quem is the death of Alexander the Great (323 BC). According to Pliny, Dicaearchus measured mountains "with the support of the kings" (cura regum). Most scholars identify these kings as Cassander and Ptolemy I Soter. If this identification is correct, this would put Dicaearchus's activity between 306 and 287 BC. However, the kings might also refer to Philip III Arrhidaeus and Alexander IV, who were the nominatim kings after the death of Alexander the Great. If that identification is correct, this moves his activity to 323–317 BC.

== Writings ==
Dicaearchus was highly esteemed by the ancients as a philosopher and as a man of most extensive and learned information upon a great variety of things. His work is known only from the many fragmentary quotations of later writers. His works were geographical, political, historical and philosophical; but it is difficult to draw up an accurate list of them, since some that are quoted as distinct works may have been only sections of greater ones, and many titles are only attested once. The fragments extant, moreover, do not always enable us to form a clear notion of the works to which they once belonged. The geographical works of Dicaearchus were, according to Strabo, criticised in many respects by Polybius, though Strabo himself was more forgiving of Dicaearchus's ignorance of western and northern Europe, since – unlike Polybius – Dicaearchus had never visited these places.

Dicaearchus wrote on cultural history, music and literature:

- Life of Greece (Βίος Ἑλλάδος) – The Bios Hellados, in three books is Dicaearchus's most famous work. It inspired the Bios Hellados of Jason (identified as Jason of Nysa by the Suda but perhaps a different historian with the same name) and Varro's De vita populi Romani and De gente populi Romani. Only a few fragments actually cite the title, but there are many fragments on cultural history that cite no title and might belong to this work. Dicaearchus apparently attempted to write a biography of the Greek nation from earliest times to the reign of Philip II. The most famous passages are those cited by Varro and Porphyry on early history, which suggest a dualistic view of progress. His anthropological theory combined elements from the Hesiodic tradition of decay with progressivist theories. From Hesiod, he adopted the concept of a "golden race", which led a life of bliss but ultimately degenerated because humans became greedy, which led to war. This is combined with progressivist ideas, such as the harsh life of early man and the gradual invention of the arts. In his reconstruction, Dicaearchus distinguished three stages: the golden race, in which man lived off the spontaneously grown fruits of the earth, the pastoral life, in which man started domesticating and hunting animals, and the agricultural life, in which agriculture was introduced. Dicaearchus apparently also explained the saying, "sharing stops choking", as a reference to how humans learned to distribute surplus fairly. Dicaearchus also discussed the origin of the polis, which he derived from the expansion of families through marriage and the kinship of brothers and sisters. According to Dicaearchus, various stages of this evolution were reflected in patrae, phratries and phylae, which were social organisations into which citizens were grouped in many cities. Another remarkable feature of the Life of Greece is that the first book discussed Egypt and Babylon, probably as cultural predecessors of the Greeks. In the Life of Greece, Dicaearchus also stated that Euripides' Medea plagiarised the Medea play of the obscure tragedian Neophron.
- On Musical Contests (Περὶ μουσικῶν ἀγώνων) and On Dionysiac Contests (Περὶ Διονυσιακῶν ἀγώνων) – These works discussed innovations in Greek music and drama. In On Dionysiac Contests, Dicaearchus probably also treated the story that, when competing at the Dionysia with the Oedipus Tyrannus, Sophocles was defeated by the tragedian Philocles, and that Aristophanes' Frogs was staged twice. In this work, Dicaearchus probably also stated that the third actor was introduced to Athenian tragedy by Sophocles.
- On Alcaeus (Περὶ Ἀλκαίου) – This was a monograph on the Lesbian poet Alcaeus of Mitylene.
- Works on Homer and Euripides – Plutarch cites Dicaearchus alongside Aristotle and Heraclides Ponticus as men who wrote on Homer and Euripides. Dicaearchus's works were probably either monographs on these poets (like his work On Alcaeus) or belonged to Problemata literature (both Aristotle and Heraclides Ponticus wrote works on Homeric problems).

Among his geographical works may be mentioned:

- Circuit of the Earth (Γῆς περίοδος) – This work was a geographical description of the world as it was then known. Dicaearchus divided the inhabited world into a northern and southern part, separated by a line running from the Strait of Gibraltar through Sicily to the Himalaya. He attempted to calculate the distances between various points on this line. In the Circuit of the Earth, Dicaearchus also treated the famous problem of the flooding of the Nile.
- Measurements of Mountains – The Suda cites the work as Measurements of Mountains in the Peloponnese (Καταμετρήσεις τῶν ἐν Πελοποννήσῳ ὀρῶν), but other fragments show that Dicaearchus also measured mountains in Thessaly and on Rhodes. The work may have been part of his Circuit of the Earth. It was the earliest known attempt to measure the heights of various mountains by triangulation, for which he used a dioptra instrument. Dicaearchus's goal was to show that mountains were not as high as people believed and therefore did not impact the sphericity of the earth. Many of his results were later adopted by Eratosthenes.

Of a political nature was:

- Tripolitikos (Τριπολιτικός) – A work which has been the subject of much dispute. It was probably a political dialogue (perhaps to be identified with the "political meeting" mentioned by Cicero) or a speech. Since the only extant fragment discusses the Spartan public meals, some scholars identify it with the Spartan Constitution. Many scholars consider it a work on the mixed constitution, but this is based on a misinterpretation of the εἶδος δικαιαρχικόν, mentioned in Photius; the word δικαιαρχικός does not refer to Dicaearchus but simply means "relating to a just government."
- Constitutions – Dicaearchus is said to have written a Spartan Constitution (Πολιτεία Σπαρτιατῶν), Pellenian Constitution (Πελληναίων πολιτεία), Corinthian Constitution (Κορινθίων πολιτεία) and Athenian Constitution (Ἀθηναίων πολιτεία). No fragments survive of these works. The Spartan Constitution was apparently read annually in the council of the ephors in Sparta, in the presence of the Spartan youth.

Among his other philosophical works may be mentioned:

- On the Soul (Περὶ ψυχῆς) – Dicaearchus wrote two works on the soul: the Lesbian Dialogue (Λεσβιακός) and the Corinthian Dialogue (Κορινθιακός), both in three books. The titles refer to the scene where the philosophical dialogue was set, viz. at Mytilene in Lesbos and at Corinth, respectively. The general title for these two works was On the Soul (Περὶ ψυχῆς). In the Lesbian Dialogue, Dicaearchus endeavoured to prove that the soul was mortal. In the Corinthian Dialogue, Dicaearchus argued that the soul has no existence outside the body. The first book presented a discussion of learned men about the soul. In the subsequent two books, a man named Pherecrates argued for the non-existence of the soul.
- On the Destruction of Men (Latin: De interitu hominum) – This work collected the causes of human destruction and concluded that man himself was the greatest threat. It is uncertain whether "De interitu hominum" is a book title or merely describes the content of the work.
- Descent into Sanctuary of Trophonius (Εἰς Τροφωνίου κατάβασις) – A work which consisted of several books. It appears to have been a work on luxury. The title refers to the oracle of Trophonius in Lebadea, where people who wished to consult the oracle had to descend into a cave. Cicero informs us that he translated a section from this work in his De re publica. The work may have also contained an account of the degenerate and licentious proceedings of the priests in the cave of Trophonius.
- On Lives (Περὶ βίων) – This was probably a philosophical work on the right way of life. The title is only attested once. The fragments on philosophers (the Seven Sages, Pythagoras and Plato) are usually attributed to this work, though they may belong to other works such as the Life of Greece or the Circuit of the Earth as well. Of particular interest is the fragment on the death of Pythagoras, for which Dicaearchus claims to rely on local oral sources from Southern Italy.
- On the Sacrifice at Ilium (Περὶ τῆς ἐν Ἰλίῳ ϑυσίας) – The title refers to the sacrifice which Alexander the Great performed at Ilium at the start of his expedition against Darius III. Together with his beloved Hephaestion, he paid honours on the tombs of Achilles and Patroclus at Troy, probably as a proclamation of their own relationship, which was mirrored on these two mythical heroes. The sole fragment that remains of this work discusses the story that, after the march through the Gedrosian Desert, Alexander passionately kissed the eunuch Bagoas in a full theatre, to great applause. This suggests that the work may have treated Alexander's relationships, perhaps as part of a more general discussion on love.

Dicaearchus also wrote speeches:

- Olympikos (Ὀλυμπικός), Panathenaikos (Παναθηναϊκός) – These are usually considered either works on contests held at the Olympic Games and the Panathenaic Games or philosophical dialogues. However, the most plausible interpretation is that they were speeches. Indeed, the Suda explicitly calls Dicaearchus an orator (ῥήτωρ).

There is lastly one spurious work and one doubtful work:

- Description of Greece (Ἀναγραφὴ τῆς Ἑλλάδος) – This work is spurious. Although it is transmitted under Dicaearchus's name, it actually consists of excerpts from two separate works. One is a geographic work dedicated to "Theophrastus", and consisting of 150 iambic lines; the acrostic of the first twenty-three lines shows that it was really the work of one "Dionysius, son of Calliphon". The other work is a prose periegesis entitled On the Cities in Greece and was written by Heraclides Criticus.
- Summaries of the Tales from Euripides and Sophocles (ὑποθέσεις τῶν Εὐριπίδου καὶ Σοφοκλέους μύθων) – This was a collection of plot summaries of the plays of Euripides and Sophocles. Many of these summaries survive in papyri or have been prefaced to the plays of Euripides in medieval manuscripts. This work is unlikely to have been written by the Peripatetic Dicaearchus. It was probably either wrongly attributed to him or was the work of another man named Dicaearchus, a grammarian of Lacedaemon, who, according to the Suda, was a disciple of Aristarchus.

== Sources ==
- David C. Mirhady, "Dicaearchus of Messana: The Sources, Texts and Translations," in Fortenbaugh, W., Schütrumpf, E., (editors) Dicaearchus of Messana: Text, Translation, and Discussion. Transaction Publishers. (2001). ISBN 0-7658-0093-4
