= Callipolis (Mysia) =

Callipolis or Kallipolis (Ancient Greek: Καλλίπολις) was a town of ancient Mysia. In the Periplus of Pseudo-Scylax, it is located between the cities of Mysia that were to the left of the Gulf of İzmit, called Olbianos kolpos (Gulf of Olbia, Latin: Olbianus Sinus), between Olbia and Cius, and it had a port.

It should be distinguished from two other cities called Callipolis that were located in the Hellespont area - both on the European side - one of these (Gallipoli) was north of Sestos and the other was on the Bosphorus. The tribute lists of Athens mention the people of Callipolis of the Hellespont, who were therefore part of the Delian League, but it is not possible to assure to which of the three cities the reference relates.

Its location is unknown.
