= Diodorus of Tyre =

2nd-century BC Greek philosopher

Diodorus of Tyre (Ancient Greek: Διόδωρος) was a Peripatetic philosopher, and a disciple and follower of Critolaus, whom he succeeded as the head of the Peripatetic school at Athens c. 118 BC. He was still alive and active there in 110 BC, when Licinius Crassus, during his quaestorship of Macedonia, visited Athens. Cicero denies that he was a genuine Peripatetic, because it was one of his ethical maxims, that the greatest good consisted in a combination of virtue with the absence of pain, whereby a reconciliation between the Stoics and Epicureans was attempted.
