= Peripatetic school =

School of philosophy in Ancient Greece

The Peripatetic school (Ancient Greek: Περίπατος lit. 'walkway') was a philosophical school founded in 335 BC by Aristotle in the Lyceum in ancient Athens. It was an informal institution whose members conducted philosophical and scientific inquiries. The school fell into decline after the middle of the 3rd century BC, but had a revival in the Roman Empire.

== History ==
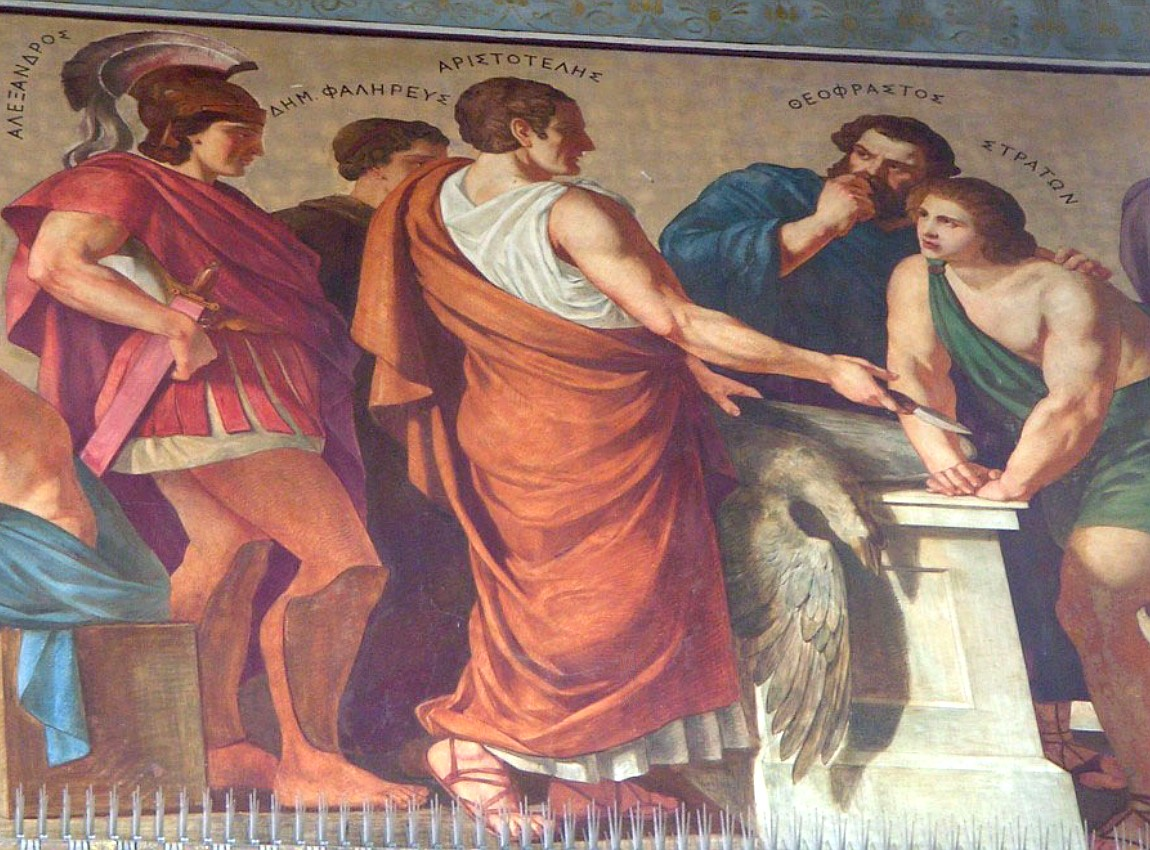
Aristotle and his disciples – Alexander, Demetrius, Theophrastus, and Strato – in an 1888 fresco in the portico of the National University of Athens

The term peripatetic is a transliteration of the Ancient Greek word peripatētikós, meaning 'of walking' or 'given to walking about'. The Peripatetic school, founded by Aristotle, was actually known simply as the Peripatos. Aristotle's school came to be so named because of the peripatoi ('walkways', some covered or with colonnades) of the Lyceum where the members met. The legend that the name came from Aristotle's alleged habit of walking while lecturing may have started with Hermippus of Smyrna.

Unlike Plato (born c. 428–423 BC, died 348 BC), Aristotle was not a citizen of Athens, and could not own property; he and his colleagues therefore used the grounds of the Lyceum as a gathering place, just as it had been used by earlier philosophers such as Socrates. Aristotle and his colleagues first began to use the Lyceum in this way c. 335 BC, after which Aristotle left Plato's Academy and Athens, and then returned to Athens from his travels about a dozen years later. Because of the school's association with the gymnasium, the school also came to be referred to simply as the Lyceum. Some modern scholars argue that the school did not become formally institutionalized until Theophrastus took it over, at which time there was private property associated with the school.

Originally at least, the Peripatetic gatherings were probably conducted less formally than the term "school" suggests: there was likely no set curriculum or requirements for students or even fees for membership. Aristotle did teach and lecture there, but there was also philosophical and scientific research done in partnership with other members of the school. It seems likely that many of the writings that have come down to us in Aristotle's name were based on lectures he gave at the school. Among the members of the school in Aristotle's time were Theophrastus, Phanias of Eresus, Eudemus of Rhodes, Aristoxenus, and Dicaearchus. Much like Plato's Academy, there were in Aristotle's school junior and senior members, the junior members generally serving as pupils or assistants to the senior members who directed research and lectured. The aim of the school, at least in Aristotle's time, was not to further a specific doctrine, but rather to explore philosophical and scientific theories; those who ran the school worked as equal partners.

Some time shortly after the death of Alexander the Great in June 323 BC, Aristotle left Athens to avoid persecution by anti-Macedonian factions in Athens, due to his ties to Macedonia. After Aristotle's death in 322 BC, his colleague Theophrastus succeeded him as head of the school. The most prominent member of the school after Theophrastus was Strato of Lampsacus, who increased the naturalistic elements of Aristotle's philosophy and embraced a form of atheism. After the time of Strato, the Peripatetic school fell into a decline. Lyco was famous more for his oratory than his philosophical skills, and Aristo for his biographical studies. Although Critolaus was more philosophically active, none of the Peripatetic philosophers in this period seem to have contributed anything original to philosophy. The reasons for the decline of the Peripatetic school are unclear. Stoicism and Epicureanism provided many answers for those people looking for dogmatic and comprehensive philosophical systems, and the scepticism of the Middle Academy may have seemed preferable to anyone who rejected dogmatism. Later tradition linked the school's decline to Neleus of Scepsis and his descendants hiding the works of Aristotle and Theophrastus in a cellar until their rediscovery in the 1st century BC, and even though this story may be doubted, it is possible that Aristotle's works were not widely read.

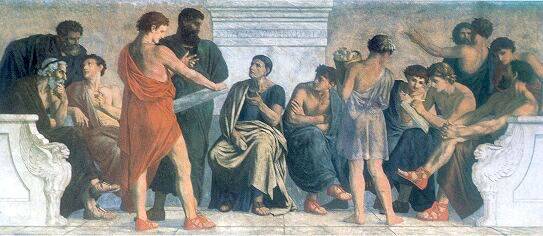
Aristotle's School, a painting from the 1880s by Gustav Adolph Spangenberg

The names of the first seven or eight scholarchs (leaders) of the Peripatetic school are known with varying levels of certainty. A list of names with the approximate dates they headed the school is as follows (all dates BC):

- Aristotle (c. 334 – 322)
- Theophrastus (322–288)
- Strato of Lampsacus (288 – c. 269)
- Lyco of Troas (c. 269 – 225)
- Aristo of Ceos (225 – c. 190)
- Critolaus (c. 190 – 155)
- Diodorus of Tyre (c. 140)
- Erymneus (c. 110)

There are some uncertainties in this list. It is not certain whether Aristo of Ceos was the head of the school, but since he was a close pupil of Lyco and the most important Peripatetic philosopher in the time when he lived, it is generally assumed that he was. It is not known if Critolaus directly succeeded Aristo, or if there were any leaders between them. Erymneus is known only from a passing reference by Athenaeus. Other important Peripatetic philosophers who lived during these centuries include Eudemus of Rhodes, Aristoxenus, Dicaearchus, and Clearchus of Soli.

In 86 BC, Athens was sacked by the Roman general Lucius Cornelius Sulla; all the local schools of philosophy were badly disrupted, and the Lyceum ceased to exist as a functioning institution. Ironically, this event seems to have brought new life to the Peripatetic school. Sulla brought the writings of Aristotle and Theophrastus back to Rome, where they became the basis of a new collection of Aristotle's writings compiled by Andronicus of Rhodes which forms the basis of the Corpus Aristotelicum which exists today. Later Neoplatonist writers describe Andronicus, who lived around 50 BC, as the eleventh scholarch of the Peripatetic school, which would imply that he had two unnamed predecessors. There is considerable uncertainty over the issue, and Andronicus' pupil Boethus of Sidon is also described as the eleventh scholarch. It is quite possible that Andronicus set up a new school where he taught Boethus.

Whereas the earlier Peripatetics had sought to extend and develop Aristotle's works, from the time of Andronicus the school concentrated on preserving and defending his work. The most important figure in the Roman era is Alexander of Aphrodisias (c. 200 AD) who wrote commentaries on Aristotle's writings. With the rise of Neoplatonism (and Christianity) in the 3rd century, Peripateticism as an independent philosophy came to an end, but the Neoplatonists sought to incorporate Aristotle's philosophy within their own system, and produced many commentaries on Aristotle's works.

== Influence ==
In the Islamic philosophical tradition some of the greatest Peripatetic philosophers were Al-Kindi (Alkindus), Al-Farabi (Alpharabius), Avicenna (Ibn Sina) and Averroes (Ibn Rushd). By the 12th century, Aristotle's works began being translated into Latin (see Latin translations of the 12th century), and Scholastic philosophy gradually developed under such names as Thomas Aquinas, taking its tone and complexion from the writings of Aristotle, the commentaries of Averroes, and The Book of Healing of Avicenna.

== See also ==
- Peripatetic axiom
