= Neleus of Scepsis =

Ancient Greek philosopher

Neleus of Scepsis (/ˈniːliəs, -ljuːs/; Greek: Νηλεύς), was the son of Coriscus of Scepsis. He was a disciple of Aristotle and Theophrastus, the latter of whom bequeathed to him his library, and appointed him one of his executors. Neleus supposedly took the writings of Aristotle and Theophrastus from Athens to Scepsis, where his heirs let them languish in a cellar until the 1st century BC, when Apellicon of Teos discovered and purchased the manuscripts, bringing them back to Athens.
