= Scepsis =

Ancient settlement in the Troad, Asia Minor

- Σκῆψις or Σκέψις (Ancient Greek)
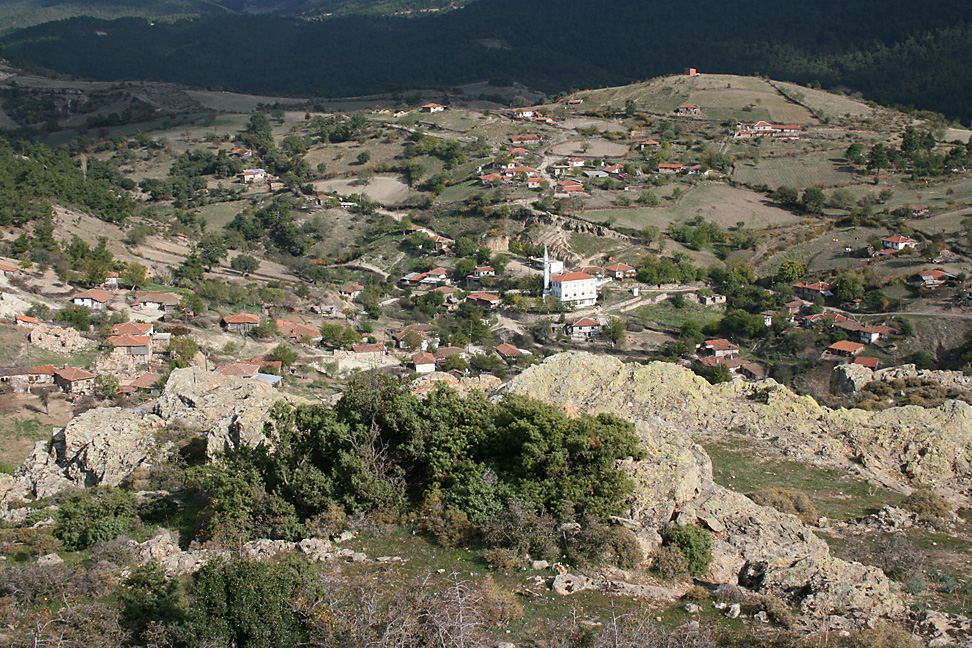
- View of the village of Kurşuntepe from the highest point of the site of ancient Scepsis.

- Location within Turkey
- 39°48′40″N 26°42′23″E
- Type: Settlement
- Location: Kurşuntepe, Çanakkale Province, Turkey
- Region: Troad

Scepsis or Skepsis (Ancient Greek: Σκῆψις or Σκέψις) was an ancient settlement in the Troad, Asia Minor that is at the present site of the village of Kurşunlutepe, near the town of Bayramiç in Turkey. The settlement is notable for being the location where the famous library of Aristotle was kept before being moved to Pergamum and Alexandria. It was also home to Metrodorus of Scepsis and Demetrius of Scepsis.

== History ==
The city of Scepsis was situated in two different, non-contemporary sites on Mount Ida, Palea-Scepsis, and the settlement of Scepsis proper. Strabo writes that Anaximenes of Lampsacus said that Miletus colonized the place.

=== Palea-Scepsis ===
Palea-Scepsis (Old Scepsis) is notable for the native tradition that it was once the "capital of Aeneas's dominions." It was situated near the source of the Aesepus, high up on Mount Ida. William Vaux was able to note in 1877 that a village in the neighborhood still bore the name of Eski Skisepje, which in Turkish corresponds to "Palea-Scepsis."

Dr. Andreas David Mordtmann, the discoverer of the settlement, is quoted on his discovery by Dr. Archibald Ross Colquhoun in a reference by Vaux.

I did discover a most ancient city with its acropolis, towers and walls built of hewn stone, and furnished with four gates. The antiquity of the place was manifested by an oak having fixed its roots in the wall, and by its trunk having grown to a girth of 530 centimeters (about 17 feet). On reference to Strabo, I first became aware that I had discovered, probably, the most ancient ruin in Asia Minor, for I hold this can be no other than Palae-Scepsis.

The city was given to Themistocles by Artaxerxes I of Persia in order to provide him with clothes.

=== Scepsis ===
Location of the later Scepsis (just above center)

The later Scepsis was about sixty stadia (7.5 miles) lower down Mount Ida from Palae-Scepsis. Its acropolis occupied the hill north of the modern village of Kurşuntepe. This later town of Scepsis is memorable for the discovery there, during the time of Sulla, of the works of Aristotle and Theophrastus, which had been buried by the illiterate relations of one Neleus (a pupil of Aristotle and friend of Theophrastus), so that they would not be carried off by Attalus I, who was then founding the Library of Pergamum.

Several times in its history, the citizens of Scepsis were forced to move elsewhere. When citizens of surrounding cities were forced to migrate to Troy, citizens of Scepsis were also forced to relocate. The city was again evacuated while the residents of surrounding cities were made to move to Alexandria Troas.

Certain traditions hold that Saint Cornelius the Centurion, the first Pagan convert to Christianity, became the first bishop of Scepsis in the early days of Christianity. Scepsis remains a titular see in the Roman Catholic Church.

=== Notable people ===
- Demetrius of Scepsis, a Greek grammarian
- Metrodorus of Scepsis, he was famous for the excellence of his memory.
- Neleus of Scepsis, a disciple of Aristotle and Theophrastus
- Midias, tyrant of Scepsis
