= Ariston =

Ariston (from Ancient Greek: Ἀρίστων) may refer to:

== People ==
Ancient Greece

- Ariston of Sparta (6th century BC), Eurypontid King of Sparta
- Ariston of Corinth, a sailor on the side of the Syracusans, encountered by the Sicilian Expedition in 5th century BCE
- Ariston (son of Sophocles) (fl. 5th century BCE), a son of the playwright Sophocles
- Ariston (explorer), sent by one of the Ptolemies to explore Arabia
- Ariston of Athens (died circa 424 BC), father of Plato
- Ariston (physician), doctor of the 5th century BCE
- Ariston of Cyrene, organizer of a revolt in Cyrene in 403 BCE
- Ariston of Byzantium (fl. 500 BC), tyrant of the city of Byzantium
- Ariston of Paionia (4th century BC), Paionian prince, cavalry commander of Alexander the Great
- Ariston (painter) (4th century BC), probably of Thebes
- Ariston, a friend of the philosopher Aristotle, to whom, according to Diogenes Laërtius (5.27), he is said to have addressed some letters.
- Ariston (king of Paionia) (3rd century BC), Paionian king
- Ariston of Tyre, (2nd and 3rd century BCE), a Carthaginian friend of Hannibal
- Ariston of Ceos, peripatetic philosopher of the 3rd century BCE
- Ariston (strategos) (fl. 221 BC), Aetolian military leader
- Ariston of Megalopolis, 2nd century BCE Achaean political figure
- Ariston of Rhodes, 2nd century BCE Roman ambassador
- Ariston of Alexandria, 1st century BCE peripatetic philosopher. See Aristo of Alexandria.
- Ariston, a renowned chaser of silver mentioned by Pliny the Elder in his Natural History (33.55, 34.19.25). He was from Mytilene, and lived some time before the first century, but little else is known of him.
- Ariston (sculptor), sculptor who lived at some point in or before the 2nd century
- Ariston (hero), the protagonist of the 1967 historical novel Goat Song
- Ariston (actor), actor at the Susa weddings
- Ariston of Alaea, Greek rhetorician who lived some time before the 3rd century

Early Christians & Jews

- Ariston of Smyrna, Bishop in the late 1st century, Companion of John the Elder
- Ariston of Pella, 2nd century apologist quoted by Eusebius
- Ariston of Apamea, Pilgrim to Jerusalem recorded in the Talmud and Mishnah

Modern

- Jose Ariston Caslib (born 1968), current manager of the Philippine national football team

== Other uses ==
- Ariston organette, metal disc with punched holes (late 1800s) — utilized on several music boxes
- Ariston Thermo, a company in the thermal comfort sector
- Ariston Records, an Italian record label
- The former name for Indesit
- Ariston, a genus of spiders

== See also ==
- Arist (disambiguation)
- Arista (disambiguation)
- Aristas
- Ariste (disambiguation)
- Aristes
- Aristi (disambiguation)
- Aristo (disambiguation)
- Ariston (disambiguation)
- Aristos (disambiguation)
- Aristus (disambiguation)
