= Aristotle (disambiguation) =

Aristotle of Stagira (384–322 BC) was a Greek philosopher.

Aristotle may also refer to:

== People with the given name ==
The modern Greek name is also anglicized Aristotelis; the French form is Aristote:

- Aristotle of Athens, 5th century BC tyrant
- Aristotle of Cyrene (4th century BC), philosopher of the Cyrenaic school
- Aristotle the Dialectician (3rd century BC), a philosopher who killed the tyrant Abantidas of Sicyon
- Aristotle of Sicily, a rhetorician
- Aristotle, several authors mentioned in a passage on writers named "Aristotle" by the writer Diogenes Laërtius in his Lives and Opinions of Eminent Philosophers (v. 35) but who are otherwise unknown:
  - Aristotle, author of a work On Excess (Περὶ Πλεονασμοῦ)
  - Aristotle, author of a work on the Iliad
- Aristotle, three obscure philosophers of the Peripatetic school
  - Aristotle, mentioned in the Meteaphysics of Syrianus (12.55) as having composed commentaries on the philosophies of his namesake Aristotle
  - Aristotle, son of Erasistratus, is mentioned by Sextus Empiricus in his Adversus Mathematicos (Πρὸς μαθηματικούς)
  - Aristotle of Mytilene, who was apparently one of the most distinguished speculative philosophers in the time of the medical writer Galen (De Consuetud. p. 553, ed. Paris.)
- Aristotle of Chalcis, historical writer
- Aristotle of Argos (3rd century BC), rebel who led a revolt against the rule of Cleomenes III in Argos
- Aristotle of Mytilene (2nd century AD), Peripatetic philosopher in the time of Galen
- Aristotele Fioravanti (c. 1415–c. 1486), Italian Renaissance architect and engineer
- Aristotelis Valaoritis (1824–1879), Greek poet
- Aristotle Onassis (1906–1975), Greek shipping magnate
- Aristóteles Picho (1957–21 December 2013), Peruvian actor
- Aristotle Pollisco (Gloc-9), Filipino rapper
- Aristotelia Peloni, Greek journalist and politician in the Cabinet of Kyriakos Mitsotakis
- Aristotle Athari, comedian and cast member on Saturday Night Live
- Aristotelis "Telly" Savalas (1922-1994), American actor

== Eponymy ==
Other things named "Aristotle" or "Aristoteles", after the philosopher:

=== Places ===
- 6123 Aristoteles, an asteroid
- Aristoteles (crater), a crater on the Moon
- Aristotelis (municipality), in Chalkidiki, Greece
- Aristotle Lane, Oxford, England
- Aristotle Mountains, Antarctica
- Aristotle University of Thessaloniki, Greece
- Platia Aristotelous (Aristotle Square), Thessaloniki, Greece

=== Works about Aristotle ===
- Aristotle (painting), a 1637 painting by Jusepe de Ribera
- Aristotle (Shields book), a 2007 book by Christopher Shields
- Aristotle, a 1919 book by Alfred Edward Taylor
- Aristotle, a 1923 translation by W. D. Ross

== Other ==
- Aristotle, Inc., a U.S. company which specializes in data-mining voter data
- Aristotle, a chatbot developed by Harmonic, see Vlad Tenev § Harmonic
- Aristotle (children's book), a 2003 children's book by Dick King-Smith
- Aristotle (horse)
- Aristotle, a character in The Addams Family
- Aristotle, the pseudonym used by the man who voiced Ken Kannif on The Slim Shady LP

== See also ==
- Aristotelian (disambiguation)
- Aristotelianism
- Peripatetic school
- Pseudo-Aristotle
- Aristo (disambiguation)
- Ariston (disambiguation)
- Aristotelia (moth)
- Aristotelia (plant)
