= Aristus (name) =

Aristus (Ancient Greek: Ἄριστος) was the name of a number of people of ancient history:

- Aristus (historian), who wrote a biography of Alexander the Great
- Aristus of Ascalon, academic philosopher of the 1st century BCE

== See also ==
- Pope Evaristus, bishop of Rome in the late 1st and early 2nd century CE
- Arist (disambiguation)
- Arista (disambiguation)
- Aristas
- Ariste (disambiguation)
- Aristes
- Aristi (disambiguation)
- Aristo (disambiguation)
- Ariston (disambiguation)
- Aristos (disambiguation)
- Aristus (disambiguation)
