= Ariste =

Ariste may refer to:

- Aristé culture, pre-Columbian culture in South America
- Ariste, Saaremaa Parish, village in Saaremaa Parish, Saare County, Estonia
- Valjala-Ariste (formerly known as Ariste), village in Saaremaa Parish, Saare County, Estonia
- Paul Ariste (1905–1990), Estonian linguist
- Ariste Jacques Trouvé-Chauvel

== See also ==
- Arist (disambiguation)
- Arista (disambiguation)
- Aristas
- Ariste (disambiguation)
- Aristes
- Aristi (disambiguation)
- Aristo (disambiguation)
- Ariston (disambiguation)
- Aristos (disambiguation)
- Aristus (disambiguation)
