= Aristos =

Aristos may refer to

- Aristos (Saga of the Skolian Empire)
- The Aristos, a 1964 book by John Fowles
- Aristos Papandroulakis (born 1965), celebrity chef
- RKVV Aristos, a former Dutch amateur football club

== See also ==
- Arist (disambiguation)
- Arista (disambiguation)
- Aristas
- Ariste (disambiguation)
- Aristes
- Aristi (disambiguation)
- Aristo (disambiguation)
- Ariston (disambiguation)
- Aristos (disambiguation)
- Aristus (disambiguation)
