= Arista =

Arista may refer to:

== Organizations ==
- Arista Networks, a software-defined networking company
- Arista Records, an American record label, division of Sony Music
  - Arista Nashville, a record label specializing in country music
- Arista (honor society), the name of New York public school chapters of the National Honor Society

== People ==
- Íñigo Arista of Pamplona (ca 790–851), first King of Pamplona
- Amanda Dwi Arista (born 1997), Indonesian singer and former members of the idol group JKT48
- Mariano Arista (1802–1855), President of Mexico
- Noelani Arista, Hawaiian and American historian

== Other uses ==
- Arista (1952 automobile), a French automobile produced from 1952 to 1967
- Arista (1912 automobile), a French automobile produced from 1912 to 1915
- Arista, one of Ariel's elder sisters from The Little Mermaid series
- Arista (insect anatomy), a bristle or bristle-like appendage
- Villa de Arista, a town and municipality in central Mexico
- Arista, West Virginia, an unincorporated community
- Arista, nickname of a companion star to Spica

== See also ==
- Arist, Arista, Aristas, Ariste, Aristes, Aristi, Aristo, Ariston, Aristos, Aristus
