= Nyctimus =

Figure in Greek mythology

In Greek mythology, Nyctimus (Ancient Greek: Νύκτιμος Nyktimos) was an Arcadian prince and the youngest of the 50 sons of the impious King Lycaon either by the naiad Cyllene, Nonacris, or by an unknown woman.

== Family ==
Nyctimus was the father of Periphetes, the ancestor of Psophis, one of the possible eponyms for the city of Psophis. This can be explained by the following genealogical link; Nyctimus, Periphetes, Parthaon, Aristas, Erymanthus, Arrhon and Psophis.

== Mythology ==
Nyctimus' role in the death of Lycaon varies from source to source. One version tells that he was killed and served up as part of a feast to Zeus; and was later brought back to life. Another story claims that he was the only son of Lycaon to survive the blast of thunderbolts of Zeus as a result of the interference of Gaia, who quickly had laid hold of his right hand and so appeased his wrath. In both versions, Nyctimus succeeds his father as king of Arcadia. But his rule was short-lived, due to floods in the age of Deucalion, which some speculate was caused, by the impiety of his brothers.

According to Pausanias, Arcadia had increased in the number on both of its cities, and population and Nyktimos, who was the eldest son of Lycaon had possessed all the power while his other brothers founded cities on the sites they considered best.

== Interpretation ==
Some scholars identify Lycaon with Zeus Lycaeus, an archaic form of Zeus possibly associated with light, who slays Nyctimus (the dark), or is succeeded by him, in allusion to the perpetual succession of night and day.

The succession of Nyctimus to the throne of Arcadia was explained by Sir James George Frazier in his notes to Apollodorus' The Library:

... we may conjecture that among the ancient Greeks or their ancestors inheritance was at one time regulated by the custom of ultimogeniture or the succession of the youngest, as to which see Folk-Lore in the Old Testament, i.429ff. In the secluded highlands of Arcadia, where ancient customs and traditions lingered long, King Lycaon is said to have been succeeded by his youngest son [i.e. Nyctimus].

== See also ==
- Pelops
