= Aristo =

Aristo (from Ancient Greek: Ἀρίστων) may refer to:

== Given name ==
- Aristo of Ceos (3rd century BC), Peripatetic philosopher
- Aristo of Chios (3rd century BC), Stoic philosopher and colleague of Zeno of Citium
- Aristo of Alexandria (1st century BC), Peripatetic philosopher
- Titius Aristo, a Roman jurist during the reign of Trajan (AD 98–117)
- Aristo of Pella (2nd century AD), Jewish Christian writer
- Aristo Sham (born 1996), classical pianist born in Hong Kong

== Surname ==
- Salman Aristo (born 1976), Indonesian screenwriter and film director

== Other uses ==
- Aristo (play), a 2008 play by Martin Sherman
- Aristo (ruler), a member of the ruling class of Eubians society in Saga of the Skolian Empire
- OZ Aristo, wheels that come on some versions of the Volkswagen Golf; see Volkswagen Golf Mk4
- Toyota Aristo, sold as the Lexus GS, outside the Japanese domestic market
- Aristo, tutor of the four characters from Caroline Lawrence's "The Roman Mysteries"
- Aristo, ancient Greek for "the best", an epithet of the goddess Artemis at Athens

== See also ==
- Aristotle (disambiguation)
- Arist, Arista, Aristas, Ariste, Aristes, Aristi, Aristo, Ariston, Aristos, Aristus
