= Beryl Wallace =

American actress

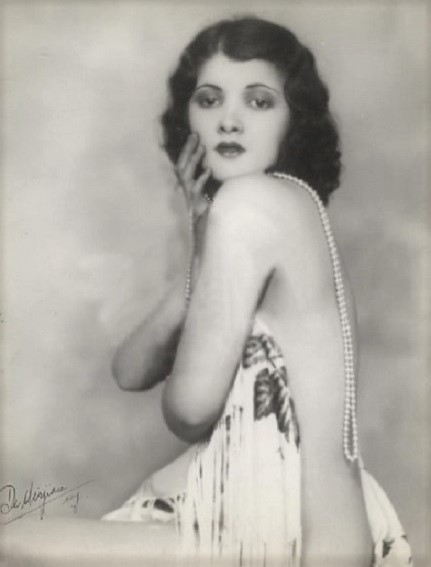
- Wallace in the 1920s
- Born: Beatrice Heischuber; September 29, 1912; Brooklyn, New York, U.S.
- Died: June 17, 1948 (aged 35); Aristes, Pennsylvania, U.S.
- Resting place: Forest Lawn Memorial Park, Glendale, California, U.S.
- Occupation(s): Singer, actress, dancer
- Years active: 1928–1948

Beryl Wallace (born Beatrice Heischuber; September 29, 1912 – June 17, 1948) was an American singer, dancer and actress.

== Biography ==
Wallace was born in Brooklyn, New York, the second of nine children of working class Jewish immigrants from Austria.

Pursuing a dancing career, she was in her teens when she saw a casting call advertisement in the newspaper and landed a role in the 1928 Earl Carroll Broadway theatre production of Vanities that was billed as having the "most beautiful girls in the world".

She adopted the surname "Wallace" as her stage name and went on to appear in six similar risqué productions that featured scanty costumes for the female performers and full nudity for the first time on Broadway.

Beryl Wallace and producer Earl Carroll began a personal relationship that would take them to Hollywood where she would perform in film and at his Earl Carroll Theatre. The theatre-supper club's facade was adorned by what at the time was one of Hollywood's most famous landmarks: a 20-foot (6.1 m)-high neon facial portrait of Beryl Wallace of which a recreation can be seen today at Universal CityWalk, at Universal City, as part of the collection of historic neon signs from the Museum of Neon Art.

Beryl Wallace made her film debut in 1934 in an uncredited role in the Paramount Pictures film production of Carroll's Broadway play Murder at the Vanities. She went on to appear in a number of small roles until 1937, when she co-starred in the Monogram Pictures "B" Western film production of Romance of the Rockies with Tom Keene. This led to another co-starring role in the 1938 film, Air Devils.

In the early 1940s she continued appearing in bit parts, but also had good secondary roles in Republic Pictures "B" Westerns starring the likes of Roy Rogers and Richard Dix. While acting in twenty-two films over a ten-year period, Wallace's primary job was as a star entertainer at Earl Carroll's theatre.

During World War II, Wallace sang weekly on two 15-minute radio shows and on Monday evenings hosted a half-hour entertainment show on NBC radio called Furlough Fun. In addition to helping entertain soldiers at the Masquers Club, on Sunday afternoons she was a volunteer dancer at the Hollywood Canteen.

== Death ==
On June 17, 1948, while en route from Los Angeles to New York City, Beryl Wallace and Earl Carroll died in the crash of United Airlines Flight 624 in Aristes, Pennsylvania. They were interred together in the Garden of Memory at Forest Lawn Memorial Park Cemetery, Glendale, California.

== Broadway performances ==
- Earl Carroll's Vanities (1940)
- The Women (1936)
- Earl Carroll's Sketch Book (1935)
- Murder at the Vanities (1934)
- Earl Carroll's Vanities (1932)
- Earl Carroll's Vanities (1931)
- Earl Carroll's Vanities (1930)
- Earl Carroll's Vanities (1928)
