= Arist =

Arist or ARIST mat refer to:

- East Slavic/Church Slavonic form of the Greek given name Aristos
- ARIST, Annual Review of Information Science and Technology, a review journal
- ARIST, Arista Records in catalogs
- Arist Craisi, Japanese light novel series
- Arist Delgado, birth name of DJ Craze, Nicaraguan American DJ and record producer

== See also ==
- Arist (disambiguation)
- Arista (disambiguation)
- Aristas
- Ariste (disambiguation)
- Aristes
- Aristi (disambiguation)
- Aristo (disambiguation)
- Ariston (disambiguation)
- Aristos (disambiguation)
- Aristus (disambiguation)
