= The Earl Carroll Vanities =

Broadway revue

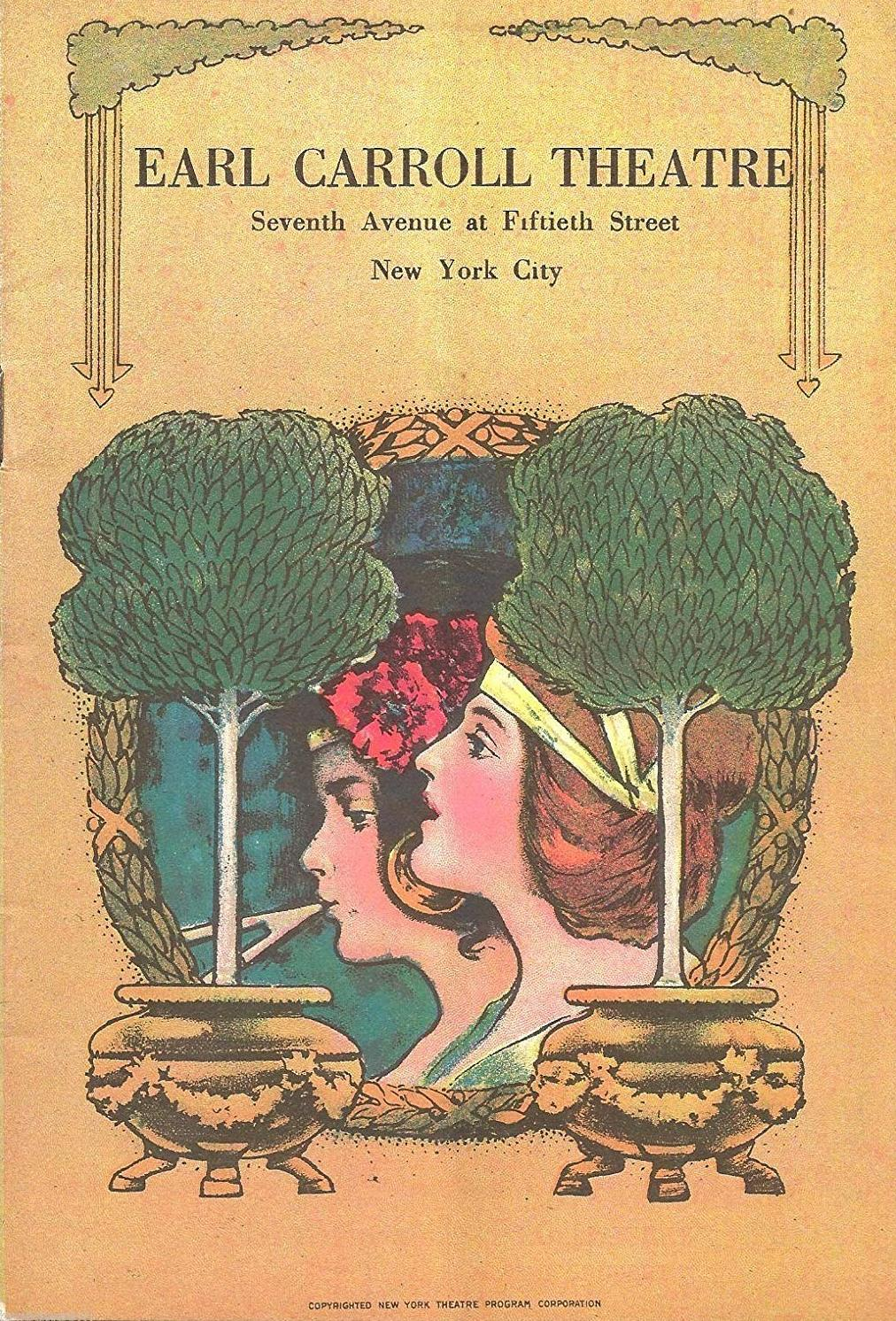
This program was originally published by the New York Theatre Program Corporation in 1923.

The Earl Carroll Vanities was a Broadway revue presented by Earl Carroll in the 1920s and early 1930s. Carroll and his show were sometimes controversial.

== Distinguishing qualities ==
In 1923, the Vanities joined the ranks of New York's other popular revues: The Greenwich Village Follies, George White's Scandals, and The Ziegfeld Follies. At a time when Florenz Ziegfeld was hailed as "The Great Glorifier of the American Girl," Carroll bragged that "the most beautiful girls in the world" passed through the stage door of his theatre. As many as 108 women were onstage in Carroll's show at one time. Critics often insinuated that Carroll's performers were provocatively dressed. Carroll frequently sublimated public scrutiny into free publicity. Though Carroll boasted of presenting larger casts than his peers, his fare was frequently regarded as somewhat unsophisticated. One critic in the New York Times described the show's comedy bits, which featured burlesque-styled dancers and minstrel-styled blackface comics, as "The same old stuff". One of Carroll's innovations was his "living curtain," which featured scantily-clad models in striking stage pictures. This wordless mise-en-scène was similar to the "ballad ballet" of The Greenwich Village Follies and the tableau vivant of The Ziegfeld Follies.

== Editions ==
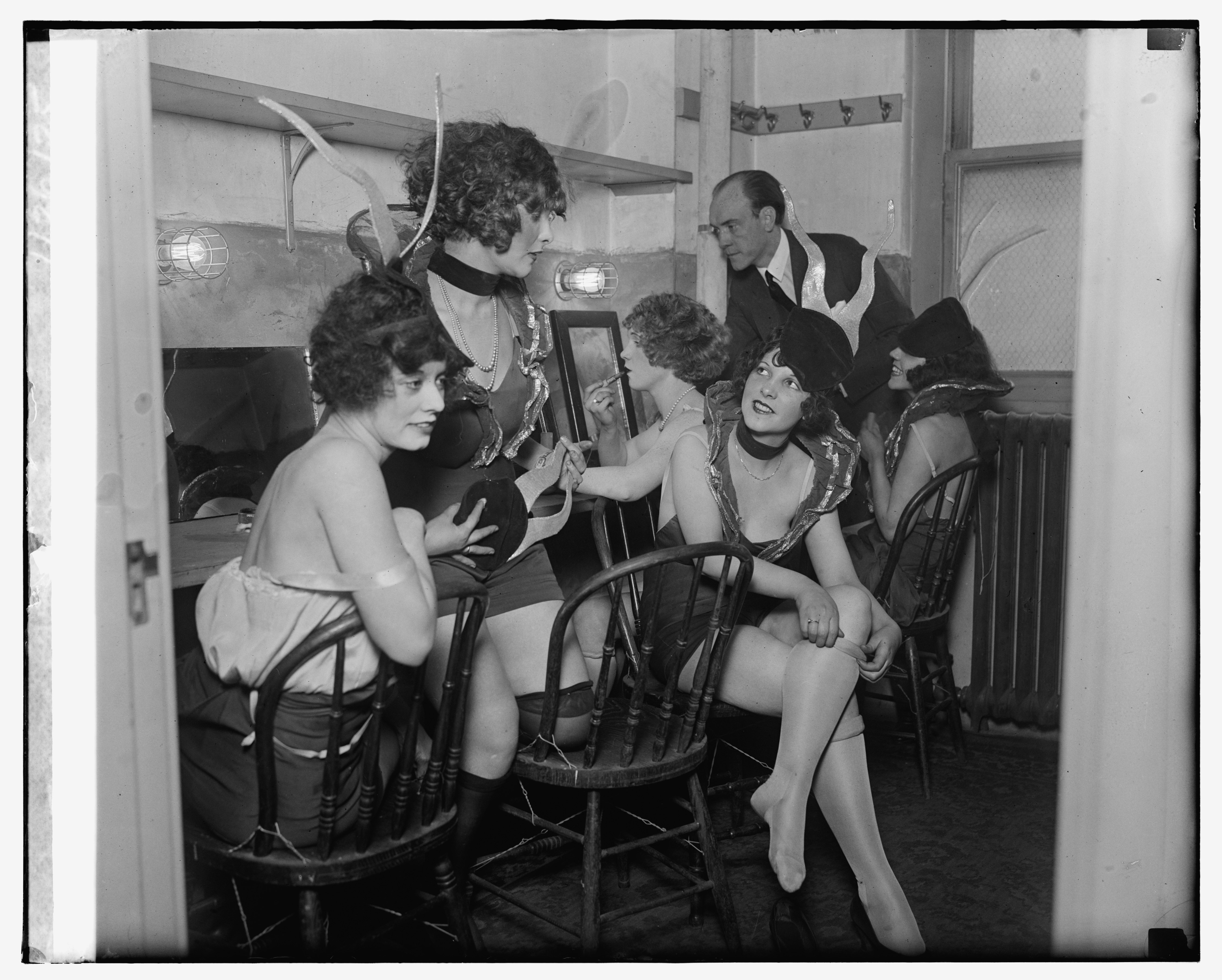
Earl Carroll giving instructions to the performers, January 26, 1925

The following chart shows the various editions of the revue:

Earl Carroll's Vanities
Year	Opened	Closed	Perf.	Theatre
1923	Jul 5, 1923	Dec 29, 1923	204	Earl Carroll Theatre
1924	Sep 10, 1924	Jan 3, 1925	133	Music Box Theatre/Earl Carroll Theatre
1925	Jul 6, 1925	Dec 27, 1925	199	Earl Carroll Theatre
1926	Aug 24, 1926	May __, 1927	303	Earl Carroll Theatre
1928	Aug 6, 1928	Feb 2, 1929	200	Earl Carroll Theatre
1930	Jul 1, 1930	Jan 3, 1931	215	New Amsterdam Theatre
1931	Aug 27, 1931	Apr 9, 1932	300	Earl Carroll Theatre/44th Street Theatre
1932	Sep 17, 1932	Dec 10, 1932	87	Earl Carroll's Broadway Theater
1940	Jan 13, 1940	Feb 3, 1940	25	St. James Theatre

== Alumni ==
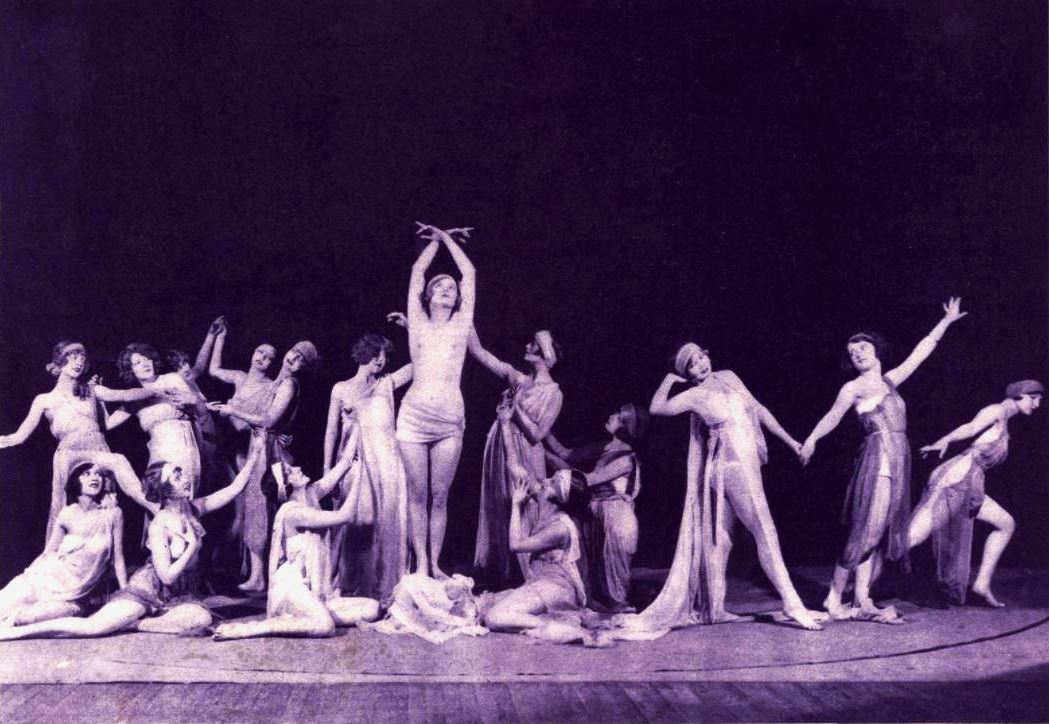
An ensemble number of the 1925 revue

Over the years, the revue proved to be a training ground for up-and-coming talent. In 1924, Sophie Tucker was Carroll's featured "chirper." W. C. Fields was credited as both a comic and an author in the 1928 show. Jack Benny made his Broadway debut in the 1930 edition. Burton Lane, who would later compose several other Broadway scores, contributed music to the 1931 edition. In 1932, long before he wrote "Over the Rainbow," Harold Arlen composed "I Gotta Right to Sing the Blues" for Carroll. The scenery and costumes that appeared in that number (and throughout the evening) brought a young Vincente Minnelli recognition. Also in that year, the comic Milton Berle played a number of eccentric characters, as he would frequently do in his television show three decades later.

Of course, not all of the revue's contributors went on to become household names. Lesser-known alumni included Kathryn Reed Altman, Faith Bacon, David Chasen, Joe Cook, Geneva Duker, Ted Healy, Naomi Johnson, Peggy Hopkins Joyce, Wayne Lamb, Charles Mack, Will Mahoney, Frank Mitchell, George Moran, Lillian Roth, Yvette Rugel, Jean Tennyson, and Beryl Wallace.

== Actors' equity ==
Propriety wasn't the only scandal that plagued the production. Before the first edition ever opened, actors were under the impression that they had auditioned for a vaudeville-type show—free from the purview of Actors' Equity. When they realized that they were rehearsing a revue, they demanded that Carroll either hire an all-Equity cast or join the Producing Managers' Association. Carroll fired the Equity members. In retaliation, around 150 Equity members refused employment with Carroll.

== Variations and legacy ==
By the mid-1920s, audiences were starting to crave storylines; Carroll took notice. With Murder at the Vanities (1933), he successfully inserted a revue into a book musical. The first edition of The Earl Carroll's Sketch Book opened in 1929, but patrons surmised that it was merely the Vanities under a different guise. Carroll's last attempt to re-stage his signature revue on Broadway closed after twenty-five performances. Bankruptcy prompted Carroll to take his operation to Los Angeles, where his spacious theatre drew appreciative crowds, especially among soldiers on leave during World War II. The new venue, with its table-and-chair seating arrangement, had the cabaret atmosphere he had once hoped to achieve in New York, notably with the fourth edition of the Vanities. In 1945, the Vanities inspired a musical film of the same title. Two other films inspired by Carroll's productions were Murder at the Vanities and Earl Carroll Sketchbook.
