= Aristi (disambiguation) =

Aristi is a village in the Ioannina Regional Unit in Epirus, northwestern Greece.

Aristi may also refer to:

- Francisco Gregorio Billini Aristi (1844–1898), Dominican writer, pedagogue, and politician
- Mikel Aristi, Spanish former cyclist

== See also ==
- Arist (disambiguation)
- Arista (disambiguation)
- Aristas
- Ariste (disambiguation)
- Aristes
- Aristi (disambiguation)
- Aristo (disambiguation)
- Ariston (disambiguation)
- Aristos (disambiguation)
- Aristus (disambiguation)
