= Earl Carroll Theatre (Los Angeles) =

Former theater and TV studio in California

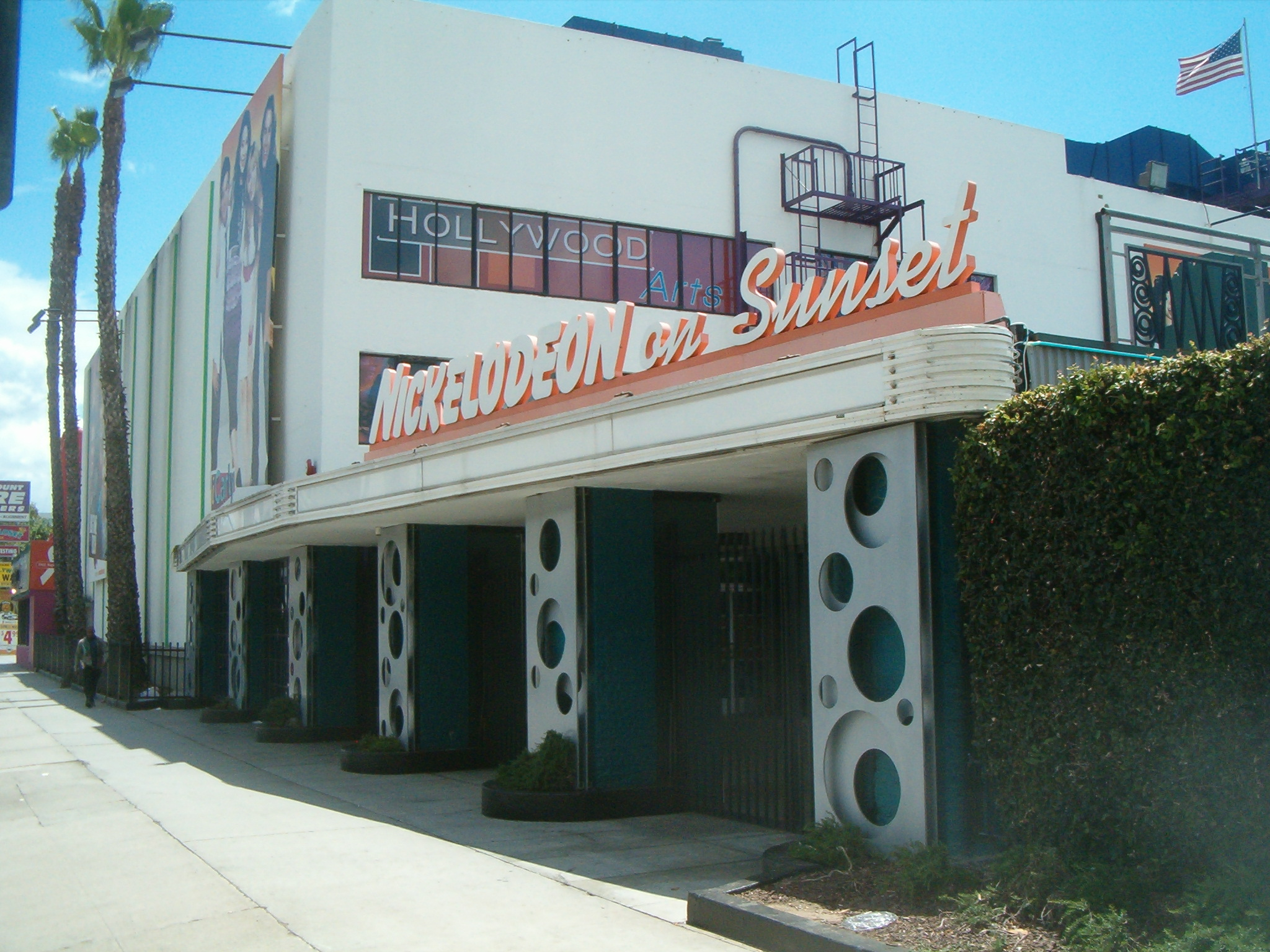
- The theatre in May 2011 as Nickelodeon on Sunset

- Location within the Los Angeles metropolitan area
- Former names: List: Moulin Rouge (1953–1964); Hullabaloo (1965–1967); Kaleidoscope (1968); Aquarius Theatre (1968–mid 1970s); Longhorn Theatre (1977); Star Search Theatre (1983–1990); The Chevy Chase Theater (1993); Nickelodeon on Sunset (1997–2017)
- Address: 6230 Sunset Boulevard; Hollywood, Los Angeles, California
- Coordinates: 34.097851°N 118.325321°W
- Type: Indoor theater, restaurant, sound stage

Construction
- Built: 1938
- Closed: 2017 (renovations)
- Architect: Gordon Kaufmann

Los Angeles Historic-Cultural Monument
- Official name: Earl Carroll Theater
- Designated: December 7, 2016
- Reference no.: 1136

The Earl Carroll Theatre is a former stage facility at 6230 Sunset Boulevard in Hollywood, Los Angeles, California. It was built by showman Earl Carroll and designed in the Streamline Moderne style by architect Gordon Kaufmann in 1938. The theatre has been known by a number of names since, including Moulin Rouge from 1953 to 1964 and the Aquarius Theater in the 1960s through the early 1980s. From 1997 to 2017, it was officially known as Nickelodeon on Sunset (or Nick on Sunset), housing the West Coast production of live-action original series produced for the Nickelodeon cable channel.

The theater closed in 2017. In 2019, the building was leased for 10 years by a pair of theater operators who said they would restore and reopen the theater as part of a new entertainment complex.

== History ==
=== Early years ===
The Earl Carroll Theatre opened on December 26, 1938, with a lavish revue, "Broadway to Hollywood," which featured sixty showgirls ascending 100 treads of stairs to a height of 135 feet. Many Hollywood celebrities were in attendance including Marlene Dietrich, Dolores del Río, the J. L. Warners, Richard Barthelmess, Sally Eilers, Edgar Bergen, Claudette Colbert, Constance Bennett, Errol Flynn, Lili Damita, William Gargan, Jackie Coogan, Betty Grable, Mary Livingstone, Phil Harris, Conrad Nagel, Mary Brian, Darryl Zanuck, David O. Selznick, and Norman Krasna. The $1,000 membership fee guaranteed a lifetime cover charge and a reserved seat.

The building was designed in the Moderne style by architect Gordon Kaufmann. The interior design is attributed to both Count Alexis de Sakhnoffsky and Frank Don Riha (1899–1957). As he had done at his New York theater, Carroll emblazoned over the entrance the words "Through these portals pass the most beautiful girls in the world". The theater-restaurant accommodated 1,200 diners and offered shows on a massive stage with a 60-foot (18 m) wide double revolving turntable and staircase and swings that could be lowered from the ceiling. The building's façade was adorned by what at the time was one of Hollywood's most famous landmarks: a 20-foot-high (6.1 m) neon head portrait of entertainer Beryl Wallace, one of Earl Carroll's "most beautiful girls in the world", who became his devoted companion. The sign survived several changes of ownership and venue name but was completely removed during major decorative overhauling in 1968. A re-creation made from photos is today on display at Universal CityWalk Hollywood in Universal City, as part of the collection of historic neon signs from the Museum of Neon Art. Another prominent exterior feature was the "Wall of Fame", on which were mounted more than a hundred individual concrete blocks autographed by Hollywood celebrities, including some of the biggest stars of the 1930s and 1940s.

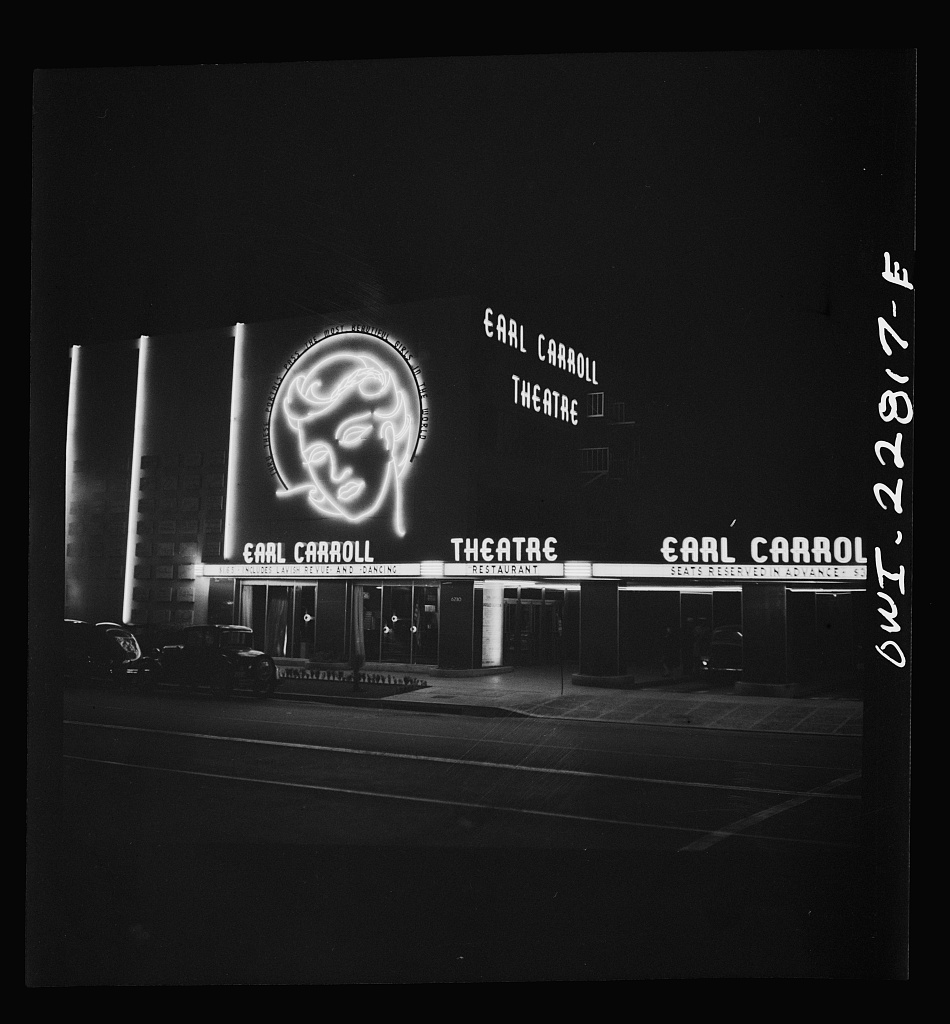
Earl Carroll Theatre, Hollywood

The Moderne-style interior was lavishly decorated with zeon (a variation of neon) tube lighting and artwork, some of which remains extant. In 1939, Life magazine described the new building: "exhibits an ultramodern, super-streamlined interior with a patent-leather ceiling, 10,000 colored zeon lights, a 15-ft. statue, an acre of burgundy carpet." The centerpiece of the foyer was the Goddess of Light, a 15-foot-tall aluminum-covered plaster statue (extant) designed by Martin Deutsch. With hands lifted to the ceiling, the statue held a fifty-foot zeon tube that wound its way to the ceiling. The columns in the lobby bar (extant) were filled with zeon lamps and zeon stalactites hung from the ceiling in the cabaret. A large painting of Carroll painted by the artist Strandanees hung near the main entrance.

Later achieving various degrees of fame in films and on television, Jean Spangler, Mara Corday, Yvonne De Carlo, Phyllis Coates, Maila Nurmi, Gloria Pall, Tyra Vaughn, and Mamie Van Doren were some of the showgirls who performed there. The facility was a nightclub for many Hollywood stars and film industry executives moguls such as Darryl Zanuck and Walter Wanger, who served on the Earl Carroll Theatre's board of governors.

The theater was sold following the 1948 deaths of Earl Carroll and Beryl Wallace in the crash of United Airlines Flight 624. It continued to operate but by the early 1950s, it was falling on hard times.

In 1953, Las Vegas showman Frank Sennes reopened the theater as a nightclub under the name Moulin Rouge. The popular TV contest show Queen for a Day was broadcast from the Moulin Rouge during part of the show's 1956–1964 run. The venue was also used for the 1965 concert film The Big TNT Show. In late 1965 it became the Hullabaloo, a rock and roll club for teenager to capitalize on the popularity of the musical variety show Hullabaloo. For several months in 1968 it was the Kaleidoscope and featured many top West Coast rock acts, with an emphasis on local bands such as The Doors.

Later in 1968, the venue was renamed the Aquarius Theater and rededicated as the home of a long-running Los Angeles production of the Broadway musical Hair. It was accordingly redecorated in the psychedelic art style by the London-based Dutch design collective The Fool, which also created iconic late-1960s graphics for the Beatles, Cream with Eric Clapton, Procol Harum and other patrons.

On Mondays, when the Hair company had its day off, the theater was still sometimes used for rock concerts and the Aquarius consequently became famous for performances there by The Doors on July 21 & 22, 1969, the live recordings of which were later issued commercially.

In 1977, it was briefly known as the Longhorn Theatre and has also been called the Sunset Boulevard Theatre.

In 1983, the Pick-Vanoff Company purchased the property and converted it into a state-of-the-art television theater that for nine years was the taping site of Star Search. The Pick-Vanoff Company also owned Sunset-Gower Studios, formerly the home of Columbia Pictures. For many years, it was used for the annual Jerry Lewis MDA Telethon. In the fall of 1993, the theater was the venue for Fox Network's The Chevy Chase Show under the name The Chevy Chase Theater. The talk show was cancelled after five weeks; the theater reverted to its previous name soon after.

=== Nickelodeon on Sunset ===
In the mid-1990s, Nickelodeon decided to move production of some live-action series to the West Coast from Nickelodeon Studios in Orlando, Florida, at Universal Studios. After scouting soundstages for a year, the network's headlining mover All That spent a year at Paramount Pictures before Nickelodeon obtained a lease for the 6238 Sunset Blvd facility, acquiring the soundstage and rebranding it Nickelodeon on Sunset by 1997. Due to limited studio space and the need to control plot spoilage for several programs, only a few series were taped at Nickelodeon on Sunset at a time. As a result, other live-action series produced for the network were filmed in other stage facilities with closed set policies throughout the Hollywood area. Some of the shows filmed there for Nickelodeon include all but the first two seasons of All That, The Amanda Show, Drake & Josh, and more recently iCarly and Victorious.

In 2004, the venue was sold to a private equity firm as part of a larger parcel of property. Nickelodeon moved out of the property in 2017, but returned in 2019 to tape the reality competition series America's Most Musical Family.

==== Productions ====
- All That (1994–2005, Seasons 3–10)
- Kenan & Kel (1996–2000, Seasons 3 & 4)
- The Amanda Show (1999–2002)
- Taina (2001–2002, Season 2)
- The Nick Cannon Show (2002–2003)
- R U All That? Competition (2003)
- Drake & Josh (2004–2007)
- Ned's Declassified School Survival Guide (2004–2007)
- Unfabulous (2004–2007)
- All That 10th Anniversary Reunion Special (2005)
- Mr. Meaty (2005-2009)
- iCarly (2007–2012, Seasons 1–5)
- Dance on Sunset (2008)
- True Jackson, VP (2008–2011, Season 1)
- Victorious (2010–2013)
- Sam & Cat (2013–2014)
- Bella and the Bulldogs (2015–2016)
- America's Most Musical Family (2019–2020)

=== Post-Nickelodeon ===
The Los Angeles City Council designated the 1938 Earl Carroll Theatre Building as an Historic-Cultural Monument during its meeting on December 7, 2016. It was partially demolished. In September 2016, the City Council also approved Palo Alto-based developer Essex Portfolio's proposal to construct a new mixed-use building on the western portion of the site of the theater building. The project will retain the historic building and incorporate new construction on the adjacent surface parking lot. The new development will be seven stories in height and linked to the theater building via a pedestrian paseo. The project calls for 4,700 square feet (440 m^{2}) of ground floor commercial space, as well as 200 residential units. Ground was broken on October 17, 2017.

On September 25, 2019, Thaddeus Hunter Smith, a former owner of the nearby Fonda Theatre, and his business partner Brian Levian announced that they had signed a ten-year lease "with the intention of not only restoring the building’s original facilities, but also transforming the site into an entertainment complex, with spaces for concerts, stage shows, movie premieres, and other specialized events," The Architect's Newspaper reported.
