= Earl Carroll =

American theatrical producer, director, songwriter and composer

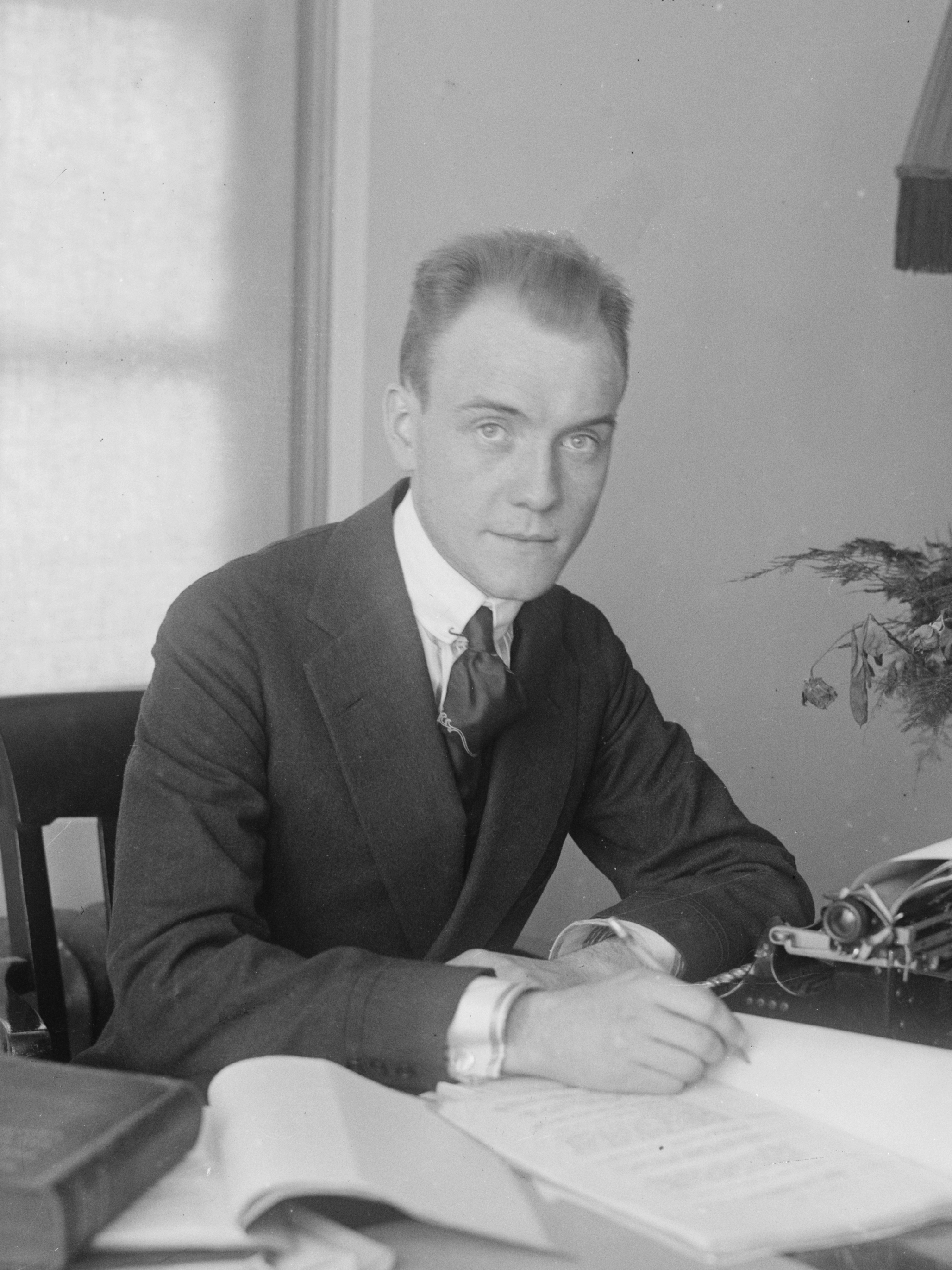
- Carroll in 1916
- Born: September 16, 1893; Pittsburgh, Pennsylvania, U.S.
- Died: June 17, 1948 (aged 54); Aristes, Pennsylvania, U.S.
- Resting place: Forest Lawn Memorial Park, Glendale, California, U.S.
- Occupations: Theatrical producer; director; writer; songwriter; composer

Earl Carroll (September 16, 1893 – June 17, 1948) was an American theatrical producer, director, writer, songwriter and composer.

== Early life ==
Carroll was born in Pittsburgh, Pennsylvania in 1893. He lived as an infant in the Nunnery Hill (Fineview) section of the North Side. Carroll later said he left the area "because there were too many tin cans and goats up there then."

== Career ==
Carroll produced and directed numerous Broadway musicals, including eleven editions of Earl Carroll's Vanities, Earl Carroll's Sketch Book and Murder at the Vanities, which became a 1934 film starring Carl Brisson, Victor McLaglen and Jack Oakie. Known as "The Troubadour of the Nude," Carroll was famous for his productions featuring the most scantily clad showgirls on Broadway.

Damon Runyon, in his short story The Brain Goes Home has the narrator remark, "Well, Mr. Earl Carroll feels sorry for Cynthia, so he puts her in the 'Vanities' and lets her walk around raw, and The Brain sees her, and the next thing anybody knows she is riding in a big foreign automobile the size of a rum chaser, and is chucking a terrible swell." In 1922, he built the first Earl Carroll Theatre in New York, which was demolished and rebuilt on a grander scale in 1931. He built a second theatre on Sunset Boulevard in Hollywood, California, in 1938.

In 1926, Carroll became involved in a scandal following a party he threw in honor of Harry Kendall Thaw, who 20 years earlier had murdered Stanford White. During the private party, a bathtub was brought out in which reposed a nude young woman, Joyce Hawley, bathing in illegal liquor, described in a news story of Carroll's death as champagne. One of the guests was Philip A. Payne, editor of the New York Mirror. Although Carroll expected his guests would be circumspect about what happened at the party, Payne published a report. Federal authorities, apparently determined to learn the source of the illegal alcohol, subpoenaed Carroll to appear (with others) before a grand jury. Carroll denied the incident happened, but others at the party confirmed it. The federal government prosecuted Carroll for perjury, and he was convicted and sentenced one year and one day in prison. He served six months at the Atlanta Federal Penitentiary.

Carroll wrote the scores for Broadway shows, including So Long Letty, Canary Cottage, and The Love Mill, for which he also wrote the libretto. As a writer of popular songs, his credits include Isle d'Amour, So Long Letty, Dreams of Long Ago, Give Me All of You, Just The Way You Are, and Dreaming, for which he supplied lyrics to the waltz by Archibald Joyce.

A pair of mid-1940s musical comedy films, Earl Carroll Vanities and Earl Carroll Sketchbook, both starring Constance Moore, were inspired by Carroll's stage revues.

== Death ==
Carroll died in the crash of United Air Lines Flight 624, which also took the life of his girlfriend, Beryl Wallace, on June 17, 1948, in Aristes, Pennsylvania.
