= Viiding =

Family name

Viiding is an Estonian surname, and may refer to:

- Arnold Viiding (1911–2006), shot putter and discus thrower
- Bernhard Viiding (1932–2001), journalist, publicist, prosaist and poet
- Elo Viiding (Elo Vee; born 1974), poet. Daughter of Juhan Viiding, granddaughter of Paul Viiding
- Juhan Viiding (1948–1995), poet and actor. Son of Paul Viiding, father of Elo Viiding
- Paul Viiding (1904–1962) poet, author and literary critic. Father of Juhan Viiding, grandfather of Elo Viiding
