= Periphetes =

Several figures in Greek mythology

Periphetes (/ˌpɛrɪˈfiːtiːz/; Ancient Greek: Περιφήτης) is the name of several characters from Greek mythology.

- Periphetes, an Arcadian king as the son of Nyctimus, son of King Lycaon. He was the father of Parthaon, ancestor of Psophis, one of the possible eponyms for the city of Psophis.
- Periphetes, also known as Corynetes (Κορυνήτης) meaning Club-Bearer from the club (κορύνη) which he carried, was a son of Hephaestus and Anticleia or of Poseidon. Periphetes was lame (possibly in his feet, πόδας) like his father and used a bronze club as a crutch. He roamed the road from Athens to Troezen where he robbed travelers and killed them with his club. Theseus encountered and killed him near Epidauros (See Plutarch, Life of Theseus, et al.).
- Periphetes, son of Copreus; he was killed during the Trojan War by Hector.
- Periphetes, king of Mygdonia. He fought with Sithon for the hand of the latter's daughter Pallene and was killed.
- Periphetes, a Trojan who was killed by Teucer.

== Other use ==
- Periphetes is a genus of Phasmatodea in the subfamily Lonchodinae.
