= The Ring (1927 film) =

1927 film by Alfred Hitchcock

- Theatrical release poster
- Directed by: Alfred Hitchcock
- Written by: Alfred Hitchcock, Alma Reville Eliot Stannard (uncredited)
- Produced by: John Maxwell
- Starring: Carl Brisson; Lillian Hall-Davis; Ian Hunter
- Cinematography: Jack E. Cox
- Production company: British International Pictures
- Distributed by: Wardour Films
- Release date: 1 October 1927 (UK)
- Running time: 108 minutes (2012 restoration)
- Country: United Kingdom
- Language: Silent film with English intertitles

The Ring is a 1927 British silent romance film directed by Alfred Hitchcock and co-written by Alfred Hitchcock and Alma Reville. The film stars Carl Brisson, Lillian Hall-Davis and Ian Hunter. Hitchcock based it on his frequent visits to the stadium club at 85 High Holborn, owned by Fred Howard.

== Plot ==
The Ring (1927)

A previously undefeated fairground boxer named "One Round" Jack Sander is beaten in the ring by a mysterious challenger, who later is revealed to be Australian Heavyweight champion Bob Corby. Bob's manager is impressed with Jack's performance and offers him the chance to become Bob's full-time sparring partner, on the condition that he win a trial fight to be arranged at a later date.

Bob begins spending more time with Jack's girlfriend Mabel and buys a bracelet for her to express his feelings. The two kiss but Mabel reluctantly puts a stop to it. The next day when Jack inquires about the bracelet, Mabel lies to Jack, telling him that Bob bought it for her because he didn't want to take the money.

Jack wins his trial fight and is made Bob's official sparring partner. Keeping his earlier promise to Mabel, he agrees to marry her the next day. Mabel goes through with the wedding, although somewhat reluctantly due to her new-found feelings for Bob. At the wedding reception Bob jokingly states that he wishes Mabel had been the prize at his and Jack's original fight. Jack boldly states that he would defend his wife in a fight against any man. A friendly exhibition match is arranged between the two fighters which Bob wins. After the fight Jack sees his bride flirting with Bob and suspects that they are having an affair. Jack declares his intent to fight Bob for the heavyweight championship, but is told he is not yet ranked high enough in the league to challenge Bob. Training intensively, Jack works his way up the rankings and eventually becomes the number one contender.

Jack arranges a party with his friends in his apartment as a way to surprise Mabel and let her know that he has won his latest fight and will now be fighting for Bob's title. Jack and his friends wait long into the night but Mabel does not show up. After Jack's friends leave, Jack stays up and waits for Mabel and eventually he sees her getting out of Bob's car. Jack angrily confronts Mabel about her liaisons with Bob and smashes a framed picture of him. Jack then goes to the club where Bob is and confronts him. Bob throws a punch but Jack knocks him out before he connects. Jack informs Bob that he is officially the number one contender and they will settle their differences in the ring.

On the day of the fight, the two fighters seem evenly matched until the final rounds where Bob starts to dominate Jack. Jack considers giving up until Mabel, seeing him in pain, runs over to his corner and declares that she wants to be with him, not Bob. Jack musters up his remaining energy and unleashes a flurry of punches in the final round, eventually knocking Bob out and winning the fight. Jack and Mabel embrace as Bob accepts defeat.

== Cast ==
- Carl Brisson as 'One-Round' Jack Sander
- Lillian Hall-Davis as Mabel (as Lilian Hall Davis)
- Ian Hunter as Bob Corby
- Forrester Harvey as James Ware
- Harry Terry as Showman
- Gordon Harker as Jack's Trainer
- Charles Farrell as Second (uncredited)
- Clare Greet as Fortune Teller (uncredited)
- Tom Helmore (uncredited)
- Minnie Rayner as Boxing Contestant's Wife (uncredited)
- Brandy Walker as Spectator (uncredited)
- Billy Wells as Boxer (uncredited)

== Production ==
The film was made at Elstree Studios by the newly established British International Pictures, which emerged as one of the two British major studios during the late 1920s and began hiring leading directors from Britain and abroad. It was Hitchcock's first film for the company after joining from Gainsborough Pictures. It was also the first film to be released by the company.

=== Inception ===
Hitchcock was 28 years old when he directed The Ring, and this was the young filmmaker's fourth film. Hitchcock regularly attended boxing matches in London where he lived, and he was struck by the fact that a good number of the spectators appeared to be from good backgrounds and dressed in white. He also noticed that fighters were sprinkled with champagne at the end of each round. These details persuaded Hitchcock to start work on The Ring.

=== Screenplay ===
After directing Downhill and Easy Virtue, two stage adaptations for the Gainsborough company, Hitchcock was frustrated and jumped at the chance to develop an idea of his own. The Ring is commonly described as Hitchcock's only original screenplay although it actually had input from at least Eliot Stannard, who wrote all of Hitchcock's other silent films. Colleagues at the studio were impressed by the neatness of Hitchcock's script and his grasp of structure. What's more, writing for silent films came naturally to a director who already thought in visual terms. He was much less comfortable with dialogue, which goes some way to explain why he took no sole writing credit in any later films and worked extensively alongside other writers throughout his career.

=== Directing ===
The film was considered a major technical work by François Truffaut in the 1966 book Hitchcock/Truffaut, and by Claude Chabrol and Éric Rohmer in their book about Hitchcock. It features use of the Schüfftan process to simulate a large audience in climactic scenes set in the Royal Albert Hall. Hitchcock returned to this technique years later in films like The Man Who Knew Too Much in its Royal Albert Hall sequence.

== Reception ==
The film was a major success with critics; however, when it went on general release it was considered a box-office failure.

== Preservation and home media ==
A restoration of The Ring was completed in 2012 as part of the BFI's £2 million "Save the Hitchcock 9" project to restore all of the director's surviving silent films.

Restored releases have appeared on DVD, Blu-ray, and video-on-demand services from Optimum in the UK as well as Lionsgate and Kino Lorber in the US, and many others.

In 2022, The Ring entered the public domain in the United States.

== See also ==
- List of boxing films
