= Aristus of Ascalon =

Ancient Greek philosopher

Aristus (Ancient Greek: Ἄριστος; fl. 46 BC) was a philosopher of ancient Greece from Ascalon (Ashkelon), aligned with the "Academic" school of philosophy, also known as Platonism. He was the pupil of and later successor to his brother, the more famous and renowned Academic philosopher Antiochus of Ascalon, and was generally considered to be the inferior philosopher.

Aristus taught philosophy at Athens and counted a number of historical luminaries among his associates: he was a contemporary and friend of Cicero, and appeared in Lucullus's entourage in the Alexandrian episode in Cicero's Lucullus. Aristus counted Marcus Junius Brutus among his students, as well as other notable philosophers such as Cratippus of Pergamon and Aristo of Alexandria, though these philosophers apparently did not have a high opinion of him.

After his brother Antiochus died around 68 BCE, Aristus took over running his school of philosophy, probably for around two decades, as it seems likely he lived until at least 46 BCE. Several of his high-profile students were not happy about this. Cratippus of Pergamon and Aristo of Alexandria were said to have "defected" to become Peripatetic philosophers after Aristus took over the school. He was probably succeeded as head of the school by Theomnestus.

It has been speculated by some scholars that this Aristus is the same person as the historian Aristus but there is not broad scholarly consensus for this conjecture.
