= Psophis (mythology) =

Characters in Greek mythology

In Greek mythology, Psophis (Ancient Greek: Ψῶφις (masculine), Ψωφίς (feminine)) was the name of four characters (one male and three female), all of whom were considered possible eponyms for the city of Psophis. They are enlisted in one passage of Pausanias' Description of Greece.

Male:

- Psophis, a descendant of Nyctimus, son of King Lycaon of Arcadia. The lineage is as follows: Nyctimus - Periphetes - Parthaon - Aristas - Erymanthus - Arrhon - Psophis.

Female:

- Psophis, an Arcadian princess as the daughter of King Lycaon, is mentioned as the possible eponym of the city by Stephanus of Byzantium.
- Psophis, daughter of Xanthus and granddaughter of Erymanthus (son of Arcas).
- Psophis, daughter of Eryx, a Sicilian despot. She was made pregnant by Heracles, who then entrusted her to his friend Lycortas, a native of the city of Phegeia (older name for the city of Psophis). She gave birth to two sons, Echephron and Promachus, who were brought up in Phegeia and renamed it Psophis after their mother.
