= Yvette Rugel =

American singer

- Born: 1890s Philadelphia, Pennsylvania
- Died: September 20, 1975; San Rafael, California
- Occupations: Singer, vaudeville performer

Yvette Rugel (1890s – September 20, 1975) was an American singer and vaudeville performer, sometimes billed as the "Miniature Prima Donna".

== Early life ==
Yvette Rugel was born in New Brunswick, New Jersey, and raised in Philadelphia, the daughter of Max Rugel and Fannie Nevyaski. Her parents were Russian Jewish immigrants; her father was a cigar maker. She was under five feet tall as an adult.

== Career ==
Rugel appeared in three Broadway productions: The Passing Show of 1917, George White's Scandals (1919), and Earl Carroll's Vanities (1926–1927). She was billed as an "opera star" or "The Miniature Prima Donna" on vaudeville bills in the 1920s, and performed music with her husband in some programs. She recorded five songs for Victor in 1921. and made several "sound shorts", a silent movie with a matching vinyl sound recording. She greeted the advent of talking pictures with optimism for opera's future: "The talkies are attracting all the great singers and great song and musical effects are being produced to the great education and pleasure of a great mass of people," she observed in 1930.

Reviews of her singing varied. "The quality of Yvette Rugel's singing is startling," noted critic Bland Johaneson in 1923, "she has chosen to continue singing the hackneyed vaudeville hits, but in a way which is different." A later critic, Burke Henry, described her voice as a "lyrical spinto", after her 1930 appearances in Rome, Paris, London, and Venice, where she sang arias for Mussolini. In 1938, New York columnist Dale Harrison called hers "one of the finest theatre voices in town." She was still performing twice-nightly shows in Philadelphia in 1943.

== Personal life ==
Yvette Rugel married a fellow vaudeville performer, Scottish-born comedian Johnny Dooley, in 1917; they had two children, John and Mary, before they divorced in 1922. She died in 1975, in her late seventies, in San Rafael, California.
