= Geneva Duker =

American actress (1905–1976)

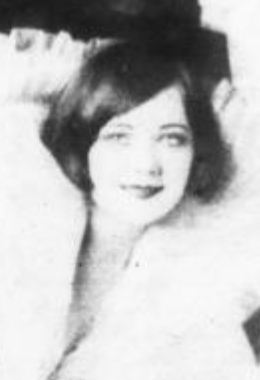
- Geneva Duker, from a 1924 publication
- Born: March 5, 1905; Boston, Massachusetts, U.S.
- Died: July 14, 1976 (aged 71); Falmouth, Massachusetts, U.S.
- Other names: Geneva Schissel, Genevieve Schissel
- Occupations: Actress; dancer; showgirl
- Spouse: Edmund Schissel (m. 1928)
- Children: 2

Geneva M. Duker Schissel (March 5, 1905 – July 14, 1976) was an American dancer, actress, and diver. She appeared on the vaudeville stage, and in several Broadway productions, in the 1920s.

== Early life and education ==
Duker was born in Boston, the daughter of William John Duker and Ellen McMenamin Duker. She became a proficient swimmer and diver at the Boston Municipal Baths, and graduated from Notre Dame Academy in Boston.

Her older sisters Susan, Alice and Jessie had a vaudeville diving act known as the Duker Sisters, which she sometimes joined for performances. In 1921 she was a featured dancer in a children's pageant, Secrets of the Sun Dial, produced in Boston to raise money for the Near East Relief Fund. She was also popular as an entertainer for recent World War I veterans.

== Career ==
Duke was a dancer who appeared on the vaudeville stage, and in several Broadway productions. She also worked as an artist's model, and performed in a high-diving stunt act with her sisters at the New York Hippodrome. Her stage credits included roles in Better Times (1922), Earl Carroll's Vanities of 1924, Greenwich Village Follies (1924, with her sister Alice), The Great Temptations (1926), The Desert Song (1926–1928), Cross My Heart (1928), and Sammy's Sally (1928). Her name and image appeared in advertisements for hosiery in 1924.

== Personal life ==
In 1928, Duker married salesman Edmund Schissel; they had two children, Edmund and Geneva. She died in 1976, in Falmouth, Massachusetts, aged 71 years.
