= Eudorus of Alexandria =

1st century BC Greco-Egyptian philosopher

Eudorus of Alexandria (Greek: Εὔδωρος ὁ Ἀλεξανδρεύς; 1st century BC) was an ancient Greek philosopher, and a representative of Middle Platonism. He attempted to reconstruct Plato's philosophy in terms of Pythagoreanism.

== Life ==
Little is known about Eudorus' life. Chronologically, he lived in the 1st century BC, and did his work prior to Strabo and Arius Didymus, both of whom quote him. He was involved in a plagiarism controversy with Aristo of Alexandria, one of Antiochus of Ascalon's students, as they had both written a work on the Nile. but he is not mentioned by Antiochus' contemporary Cicero, implying he was not one of Antiochus' students. Eudorus also wrote a survey of philosophy, at least one portion of which dealt with ethics, of which a summary by Arius Didymus is preserved in Stobaeus. He also wrote a commentary on Plato's Timaeus which is referred to by Plutarch, and may also have written a commentary on the Categories of Aristotle.

== Philosophy ==
Eudorus combined Platonist, Pythagorean and Stoic ideas in his philosophy. He divided philosophy into ethics, physics, and logic, taking Ethics as prior to Physics, as opposed to the Stoics, who considered physics to come before ethics. In ethics, Eudorus formulated a teleological principle for Platonism, derived from the Theaetetus: "as much as we can, become like God." In this he believed that he had found an apt definition of the common goal of Pythagoras, Socrates, and Plato. In physics, Eudorus' account of first principles, postulates the existence of a highest principle, called "The One," above the Pythagorean Monad and Dyad, which Eudorus called God. Although Eudorus considers this to be a Pythagorean doctrine, modern scholars such as John M. Dillon consider this to have likely originated with Eudorus, based on the extant Pythagorean fragments recorded by Alexander Polyhistor, which show little or no trace of this doctrine. In logic, Eudorus appears to have rejected Aristotle's theory of categories, preferring to derive them from the Old Academy categories of "Absolute" and "Relative" which were developed by Xenocrates.

== Legacy ==
Eudorus is mentioned by Alexander of Aphrodisias in his commentary on Aristotle's Metaphysics. Simplicius refers to him as a Peripatetic philosopher, and relates that he had written on the Aristotelian Categories.

The way Aristotle's texts were available to Eudorus is now an open field for research.

== Bibliography ==
- Bonazzi, Mauro, "Eudorus and early Imperial Platonism", in R.W. Sharples-R. Sorabji (eds.), Greek and Roman Philosophy 100 BC-200 AD, London, Bulletin of the Institute of Classical Studies Supplement 2007, Vol. II, pp. 365–378.
- Dillon, John M. (1996). The Middle Platonists, 80 B.C. to A.D. 220. Cornell University Press. ISBN 978-0-8014-8316-5.
- Mazzarelli, Claudio. Raccolta e interpretazione delle testimonianze e dei frammenti del medioplatonico Eudoro di Alessandria, in Rivista di Filosofia Neoscolastica, 77 (1985), pp. 197–209 e 535-555 (Greek text of the extant fragments with Italian translation).
