= Ship Cafe =

1935 film by Robert Florey

- Directed by: Robert Florey
- Written by: Herbert Fields; Harlan Thompson
- Produced by: Harold Hurley
- Starring: Carl Brisson; Arline Judge; Mady Christians
- Cinematography: Theodor Sparkuhl
- Edited by: James Smith
- Music by: Tom Satterfield
- Production company: Paramount Pictures
- Distributed by: Paramount Pictures
- Release date: November 9, 1935
- Running time: 65 minutes
- Country: United States
- Language: English

Ship Cafe is a 1935 American musical comedy film directed by Robert Florey and starring Carl Brisson, Arline Judge and Mady Christians. It was produced and distributed by Paramount Pictures as a second feature.

== Plot ==
Chris Anderson, a Danish stoker aboard a passenger liner, is back by a high society countess who promoted his singing talent at a floating nightclub.

== Cast ==
- Carl Brisson as Chris Anderson
- Arline Judge as Ruby
- Mady Christians as Countess Boranoff
- William Frawley as Briney O'Brien
- Eddie Davis as Eddie Davis
- Inez Courtney as Molly
- Grant Withers as Rocky Stone
- Hedda Hopper as Tutor
- Irving Bacon as Slim
- uncredited players include Jack Norton and Tiny Sandford

== Bibliography ==
- Dick, Bernard F. Forever Mame: The Life of Rosalind Russell. University Press of Mississippi, 2009.
- Wollstein, Hans J. . Strangers in Hollywood: the History of Scandinavian Actors in American Films from 1910 to World War II. Scarecrow Press, 1994.
