= Earl Carroll's Sketch Book =

Earl Carroll's Sketch Book, sometimes given as Earl Carroll's Sketchbook, was a musical revue produced and conceived by Earl Carroll that ran in two separate iterations on Broadway; one in 1929-1930 and the other in 1935.

== Earl Carroll's Sketch Book (1929-1930) ==
The first Earl Carroll Sketchbook opened at the Earl Carroll Theatre on July 1, 1929. It ran on Broadway for a total of 329 performances. It used music and lyrics by Yip Harburg and Jay Gorney, and a book co-written by Carroll, Sidney Skolsky, and Eddie Cantor. While Cantor was billed as a star in this revue, in reality he only appeared in a short film screened during the show. The cast performing live was led by the dancer Will Mahoney. Some of the other cast members included Patsy Kelly, William Demarest, and George Givot.

The show's tuneful score and funny script propelled this show into claiming the spot as the big hit of the 1929-1930 Broadway season with a run that lasted nearly a year.

== Earl Carroll's Sketch Book (1935) ==
The second Earl Carroll Sketchbook opened at the Winter Garden Theatre on June 4, 1935. During it run it transferred to the Majestic Theatre. Between the two theaters it ran on Broadway for 207 performances; closing on November 30, 1935. The show's loose plot was based around the idea of showing vignettes of American history from the perspective of a chorus girl. The show used music and lyrics by Charles Tobias, Murray Mencher, Charles Newman, Norman Zeno and Will Irwin. Its book was by Eugene Conrad, Charles Sherman and Royal Foster.

Actor and comedian Ken Murray served as narrator for Earl Carroll's Sketch Book. The cast also featured the comic musical duo Arren and Broderick. Charlotte Arren did a comic impersonation of soprano Jenny Lind with her husband Johnny Broderick as her pianist as their featured part of the show.
