= Valjala-Ariste =

Village in Estonia

- Village
- Location in Estonia
- Coordinates: 58°24′01″N 22°49′04″E
- Country: Estonia
- County: Saare County
- Municipality: Saaremaa Parish

Population (2011 Census)
  - Total: 17

Valjala-Ariste (Ariste until 2017) (German: Harris) is a village in Saaremaa Parish, Saare County, Estonia, on the island of Saaremaa. As of the 2011 census, the settlement's population was 17.

Estonian poet and publicist Bernhard Viiding was born in the village.
