= Notre Dame Philosophical Reviews =

Academic book review journal published by University of Notre Dame

- Discipline: Philosophy
- Language: English
- Edited by: Christopher Shields

Publication details
- History: January 2002–present
- Publisher: University of Notre Dame (United States)

Standard abbreviations
- ISO 4: Notre Dame Philos. Rev.

Indexing
- ISSN: 1538-1617
- OCLC no.: 48927536

Links
- Journal homepage

Notre Dame Philosophical Reviews (NDPR) is an online-only peer-reviewed academic journal published by the University of Notre Dame that contains book reviews of books in topics related to philosophy. It was established in 2002. The editors-in-chief are Gary Gutting and Anastasia Friel Gutting (aka. Stacie Gutting).

== Editorial board ==
As of November 2013, the editorial board included a number of eminent philosophers such as Robert Audi, David Chalmers, Brian Leiter, and Paul Moser. After passing away of Gary Gutting in 2019, Anastasia Friel Gutting also announced her resignation, and Jc Beall was named the new editor. In June, 2021 editorship turned over to Christopher Shields.

== Goals and format ==
The reviews are typically 1,500 to 2,500 words in length. The website states that its goal is to publish a book review of any major scholarly philosophical book within six to twelve months of the book's publication. Reviews are commissioned and vetted by the editorial board. Only newly released books and anthologies are reviewed, not reprints or new editions unless they contain substantial new material.

== Accessibility ==
The journal is published electronically (online) only. In addition to browsing the website for free, people can also subscribe for free via email or RSS. Any material appearing in the journal may be copied for educational use provided proper credit is given to the author and the journal.

== Reception ==
In 2007, philosopher Brian Leiter quoted the review of Jason Powell's book, Jacques Derrida: A Biography by Nancy Holland of Hamline University:

One wonders, for instance, about the statement that philosophy in America "has the role of legitimating the US government and the scientific enterprise" leading to the suggestions that analytic philosophy "has as its telos the establishment of a universal culture for a static, totalitarian universal civilization" (pp. 124-125). Intriguing, and possibly even largely justified, but surely in need of much more argument.

Leiter criticized the view of Analytic philosophy legitimizing the US government by describing it as "sophomoric prattle befitting a bad undergraduate's blog". Naming major philosophers such as Alvin Plantinga, George Bealer, Hilary Putnam, Michael Rea, and John McDowell, among others who would never appear on Fox News television. "I want to start by saying that Notre Dame Philosophical Reviews is a wonderful resource, for which the whole profession is indebted to Gary Gutting who runs it so well." He then went on to criticize one of the reviews that appeared on the site. In 2012, the blog Philosophers Anonymous criticized the journal for publishing low-quality reviews.

=== Publication decline ===
In March, 2024 Daily Nous reported a decline in the number of book reviews published by NDPR. In 2023 the journal published only 65 book reviews, which was a significant drop compared to the 2006-2019 period (i.e. Gutting's editorship), during which NDPR published from 250 to 426 reviews annually. Brian Leiter mainly noted lack of "course relief" for the new editors as the main cause of the decline, however, Christopher Shields in response, while acknowledging time and budget constraints, said that the journal has the capacity to annually publish 120 reviews, though the lack of enough submissions as the main cause of the decline. In response a month later NDPR announced that it welcomes and will accept "proposals for reviews" to reverse the declining trend.

== See also ==
- PhilPapers
- Stanford Encyclopedia of Philosophy
- Internet Encyclopedia of Philosophy
- Routledge Encyclopedia of Philosophy
