= Christopher Shields =

American philosopher (born 1958)

- Born: 26 July 1958 (age 68)

Academic background
- Education: Bowling Green State University (BA, MA), Cornell University (PhD)
- Thesis: Aristotle's Philosophy of Mind (1986)
- Doctoral advisor: Terence Irwin
- Other advisors: Gail Fine, Sydney Shoemaker, Michael Woods

Academic work
- Era: 21st-century philosophy
- Region: Western philosophy
- School or tradition: Ancient philosophy
- Institutions: University of Notre Dame; University of Oxford; University of California, San Diego
- Main interests: Aristotle

Christopher Shields (born 26 July 1958) is an American philosopher and the Henry E. Allison Endowed Chair in the History of Philosophy at the University of California San Diego. He is an Honorary Research Fellow of Lady Margaret Hall, University of Oxford, where he was Professor of Classical Philosophy and Chair of the Philosophy Faculty Board. He was formerly the George N. Shuster Professor of Philosophy at the University of Notre Dame. He is the editor of Notre Dame Philosophical Reviews.

== Books ==
- Fractured Goodness: Aristotle's Response to Plato's Form of the Good, Oxford University Press 2024
- Aristotle's De Anima, Translated with Introduction and Commentary, Oxford University Press 2016
- Ancient Philosophy: A Contemporary Introduction, Routledge 2011
- Aristotle, Routledge 2007
- Classical Philosophy: A Contemporary Introduction, Routledge 2003
- The Philosophy of Thomas Aquinas, with Robert Pasnau, Westview Press 2003
- Blackwell Guide to Ancient Philosophy, ed., Blackwell Publishers 2002
- Order in Multiplicity: Homonymy in the Philosophy of Aristotle, Oxford University Press 1999; paperback edition 2001
