= Prince of Arcadia =

- Directed by: Hanns Schwarz
- Written by: Walter Reisch (play); Reginald Fogwell
- Produced by: Reginald Fogwell; Archibald Nettlefold
- Starring: Carl Brisson; Margot Grahame; Ida Lupino
- Cinematography: Geoffrey Faithfull
- Music by: Robert Stolz
- Production company: Nettlefold Films
- Distributed by: Woolf and Freedman Film Service
- Release date: July 1933
- Running time: 80 minutes
- Country: United Kingdom
- Language: English

Prince of Arcadia is a 1933 British musical comedy film directed by Hanns Schwarz and starring Carl Brisson, Margot Grahame, Ida Lupino and Peter Gawthorne. It is a remake of the 1932 German film The Prince of Arcadia.

It was shot at Walton Studios, with sets designed by the art director Andrew Mazzei.

== Plot ==
A Ruritanian Prince is due to marry a princess with acting ambitions, but has fallen in love with another woman.

== Cast ==
- Carl Brisson as Prince Peter
- Margot Grahame as Mirana
- Ida Lupino as The Princess
- Annie Esmond as The Queen
- Peter Gawthorne as Equerry
- C. Denier Warren as Detective

== See also ==
- The Prince of Arcadia (1932)
