= TWA Flight 513 =

1946 aviation accident

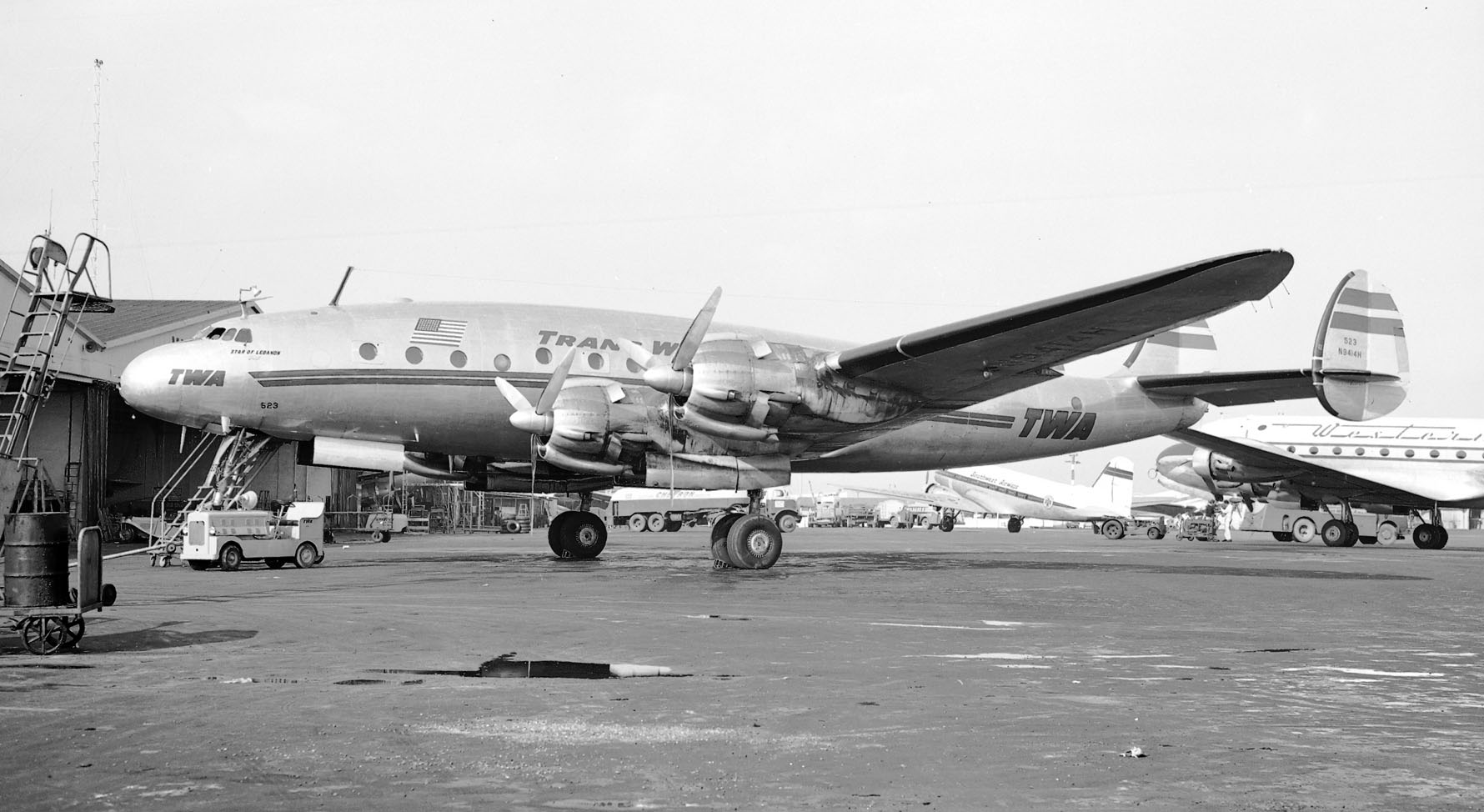
- A TWA Lockheed L-049, similar to the aircraft involved in the accident

Accident
- Date: July 11, 1946
- Summary: In-flight fire
- Site: Bern Township, Pennsylvania, U.S.; 40°24′58″N 75°59′29″W

Aircraft
- Aircraft type: Lockheed L-049 Constellation
- Aircraft name: Star of Lisbon
- Operator: Transcontinental & Western Air
- Registration: NC86513
- Occupants: 6
- Crew: 6
- Fatalities: 5
- Injuries: 1
- Survivors: 1

TWA Flight 513, registration NC86513, Star of Lisbon, was a Lockheed L-049 Constellation operated by Transcontinental and Western Air on a training flight on July 11, 1946, near Reading, Pennsylvania.

== Description ==
The electrical wiring in the baggage compartment of TWA Flight 513 on July 11, 1946, arced, starting a fire while the aircraft was in the air. The smoke and intense fire that were created made it impossible for the pilots to maintain control of the aircraft.

Of the six crewmembers aboard, five were killed.

This accident was memorable for the subsequent grounding of all Lockheed Constellations that was required from July 12 until August 23, 1946, when cargo fire detection equipment could be installed on all similar airplane models.

== See also ==
- United Airlines Flight 624
