= Notre Dame Academy (Hingham, Massachusetts) =

Location
- 1073 Main Street; Hingham, MA 02043; United States

Information
- Type: Private, All-Girls
- Religious affiliation: Roman Catholic
- Established: 1853; 173 years ago
- Founder: Sisters of Notre Dame de Namur
- NCES School ID: 00599613
- President: Annemarie Lynch Kenneally ’80 P’13 ’15
- Faculty: 38.8 (on FTE basis)
- Grades: 7 – 12
- Student to teacher ratio: 11:1
- Campus size: 68 acres (280,000 m^{2})
- Colors: Blue and Gold
- Mascot: Cougar
- Accreditation: New England Association of Schools and Colleges
- Alumni: 6,000
- Website: www.ndahingham.com

Notre Dame Academy is a private, all-girls Roman Catholic high school in Hingham, Massachusetts. It is located in the Roman Catholic Archdiocese of Boston.

== History ==
Notre Dame Academy (NDA), sponsored by the Sisters of Notre Dame de Namur, is the oldest Catholic day academy for girls in New England. Located in Hingham, MA since 1965, it has its roots in two earlier academies: Notre Dame Academy, Boston (Lancaster Street, Berkeley Street, the Fenway, Granby Street) begun in 1853, and Notre Dame Academy, Roxbury, opened in 1854.

Sisters of Notre Dame traveled to the east coast from Cincinnati to found the academies. The Boston Academy began in a simple wooden structure (Lancaster Street) and, within ten years, the growing school moved to larger facility. For the next fifty years, the academy had strong religious and intellectual influence from its Berkeley Street campus. In 1916, the school moved to 400 Fenway. By 1919 the school jointly owned the location with the new Emmanuel College, which still uses the site. As Emmanuel College expanded, the Academy moved to Granby Street. The Boston Academy continued to operate at this site until 1954.

Notre Dame Academy at Washington Street in the Roxbury section of Boston began in 1854 as a day school and boarding school. In 1954, the students from the Granby Street School joined the students at the Roxbury campus and there was one Academy in the city. As the city changed and the needs of the South Shore increased, the school relocated to the present Hingham campus. Today, to meet the needs of the current student body, NDA is rebuilding at the Hingham campus and expanding its facilities.

For over 155 years, the Sisters of Notre Dame de Namur and their lay colleagues have provided a college preparatory education to young women, encompassing the spiritual, intellectual, social, and physical development of their students.

== Campus ==
The school is located on a 68-acre (280,000 m^{2}) campus. The academic building consists of a chapel, auditorium, classrooms, science labs, art rooms, music and choral rooms, library, computer labs, the Maribeth Merrigan Multi Media Learning Center, guidance center, gymnasium, cafeteria, offices, and meeting rooms. The campus includes a memorial garden, three multipurpose athletic fields, an eight-lane track, and five tennis courts.

== Student body ==
Students come to NDA from over 40 towns across the South Shore and surrounding areas. They travel south from Norwood, Westwood, and Boston. Some travel northeast from the Brockton area and others travel north along the Route 3 corridor from towns such as Plymouth, Kingston, and from Cape Cod. Students come from a variety of public, private and parochial schools.

Notre Dame Academy is an all girls academy. In 2023-24, there were 429 students, with a teacher-to-student ratio of 11:1.

== Tuition ==
Tuition for the 2026-2027 academic year is $34,600, with need based financial aid options.

== Notable alumnae ==
- Geneva Duker, dancer
- Maura Tierney, actress
- Laura Duksta, author
- Molly Considine, teacher, Real Housewives of Rhode Island
- Caraid O'Brien, playwright
