= Aristotle (Shields book) =

2007 book by Christopher Shields

- Editors: Christopher Shields
- Language: English
- Subject: Aristotle
- Publisher: Routledge
- Publication date: 2007, 2nd ed. 2014
- Media type: Print (Hardcover)
- Pages: 456 pp.
- ISBN: 9780415283328

Aristotle is a 2007 book by Christopher Shields in which the author provides an introduction to Aristotle's thought. The book has been translated into Chinese, Turkish and Persian. The second edition of the book was published in 2014.

== Reception ==
Barbara Sattler calls the book "a very readable and helpful guide to Aristotle". Hamidreza Mahboobi Arani (from Tarbiat Modares University) won the Iranian Book Review Award for reviewing the book.
