= Ariston of Cyrene =

Political and military leader in Libya (6th-5th century BCE)

Ariston (Ancient Greek: Ἀρίστων) was the leader of the democratic political party in Cyrene, Libya in the late 6th and early 5th centuries BCE, and a leader in the civil war that broke out around the turn of the century.

After an election that led to a tie between the democratic party and the party of the aristocratic nobles, Ariston led an insurrection against the aristocratic party. He obtained possession of the town and executed about 50 of the nobles (Diodorus Siculus gives the number as 500), and expelled a great deal more from the city, most of whom decamped to the nearby city of Euesperides.

There the nobles raised an army of 3000 Messenian mercenaries, and marched on Cyrene. The fighting was severe, but ended in a stalemate.

Afterwards, the two sides came to an agreement and the powers of government were divided, with each party agreeing to alternate running the state for one year each.

Some scholars believe it was this event that the philosopher Aristotle was referring to in his Politics when describing the "revolution at Cyrene".

"Ariston" was an exceptionally common name in Cyrene at this time, and there are several other people named "Ariston of Cyrene" in the literature:

- Ariston of Cyrene, son of Menon, mentioned in an epigram of Theaetetus of Cyrene as having died at sea.
- Ariston of Cyrene, husband to Zeuxo, who won the women's four-horse chariot event at the Panathenaic Games in 198 BCE.
