= Parthaon (mythology) =

In Greek mythology, Parthaon (Ancient Greek: Παρθάων, romanized: Parthaon) may refer to two different characters:

- Parthaon, more commonly known as Porthaon, king of Calydon and father of Oeneus, the grandfather of Diomedes.
- Parthaon, an Arcadian king as the son of Periphetes, descendant of King Lycaon. He begat Aristus who became the ancestor of Psophis, one of the possible eponyms for the city of Psophis. In some accounts, Parthaon was instead the son of Dorieus, son of Eikadios and Coroneia. He was the father of Paros and Ceteus who had a daughter Callisto by Stilbe.
