= Ariston of Alaea =

Ancient Greek rhetorician

Ariston of Alaea (Ancient Greek: Ἀρίστων ό Ἀλαιεύς), an otherwise unknown place (possibly Halaesa), was a rhetorician of ancient Greece who wrote, according to Diogenes Laërtius, scientific treatises on rhetoric.

Another rhetorician of the same name, a native of Gerasa, is mentioned by Stephanus of Byzantium.
