= Erymanthus (mythology) =

In Greek mythology, the name Erymanthus (Ancient Greek: Ἐρύμανθος, romanized: Erýmanthos) may refer to:

- Erymanthus, god of the river Erymanthus. He was worshipped at Psophis.
- Erymanthus, son of Apollo, who saw Aphrodite bathing naked after having sex with Adonis, and was blinded by the angry goddess. Apollo took revenge on Aphrodite by changing himself into a boar and killing Adonis (see Erymanthian Boar).
- Erymanthus, an Arcadian king as the son of Aristas, descendant of King Lycaon. He became the father of Arrhon, and grandfather of Psophis (male). Alternately, Erymanthus was the son of Arcas, the father of Xanthus, and again grandfather of another Psophis (female).
- Erymanthus, the chain of mountains in Arcadia where Hercules killed the boar; for its forests cf. Ovid Metamorphoses 2.499: silvas Erymanthidas ambit.
