= Ariston of Megalopolis =

Achaean political figure (2nd century BCE)

Ariston (Ancient Greek: Ἀρίστων) of Megalopolis was a political figure of some sort in Achaea in the 2nd century BCE. At the outbreak of the Third Macedonian War in 171 BCE, pitting the Romans against Perseus of Macedon, Ariston advised the Achaeans to ally themselves with the Romans, and not to remain neutral between the two belligerent parties.

In the next year, he was one of the Achaean ambassadors -- along with Archon of Aegeira and Arcesilaus of Megalopolis -- who were sent to bring about a peace in the Sixth Syrian War between Antiochus IV Epiphanes and Ptolemy VI Philometor.

We also have inscriptions describing an Ariston of Megalopolis who in 224 BCE was a demiurge and one of ten deputies at a gathering where the historian Phylarchus was declared proxenos and benefactor of the Arcadians. Some scholars suppose this is the grandfather of the Ariston of Megalopolis described above, but this is not universally agreed upon.
