= Murder at the Vanities =

1934 film by Mitchell Leisen

- Directed by: Mitchell Leisen
- Written by: Carey Wilson; Joseph Gollomb; Sam Hellman (dialogue); Jack Cunningham (uncredited)
- Based on: Murder at the Vanities; 1933 play by Earl Carroll; Rufus King
- Produced by: E. Lloyd Sheldon
- Starring: Victor McLaglen; Carl Brisson; Jack Oakie; Kitty Carlisle; Gertrude Michael; Toby Wing; Jessie Ralph; Duke Ellington
- Cinematography: Leo Tover
- Edited by: William Shea (uncredited)
- Music by: Howard Jackson (uncredited); William E. Lynch (uncredited); Milan Roder (uncredited)
- Production company: Paramount Pictures
- Release date: May 21, 1934
- Running time: 89 minutes
- Country: United States
- Language: English

Murder at the Vanities is a 1934 American pre-Code musical film with music by Victor Young. It was released by Paramount Pictures and directed by Mitchell Leisen. The film stars Victor McLaglen, Carl Brisson, Jack Oakie, Kitty Carlisle, Gertrude Michael, Toby Wing and Jessie Ralph. Future stars Lucille Ball and Ann Sheridan have small roles as chorines.

The film is primarily a musical, based on Earl Carroll's long-running Broadway revue Earl Carroll's Vanities, combined with a murder mystery. Songs featured in the film by Arthur Johnston and Sam Coslow include "Cocktails for Two" sung by Brisson, "Sweet Marijuana" sung by Michael, "Where Do They Come From (And Where Do They Go)" sung by Carlisle and "Ebony Rhapsody" performed by Duke Ellington and his orchestra and sung by Michael.

== Plot ==
Jack Ellery is staging a lavish musical revue starring Eric Lander, Ann Ware and Rita Ross, supported by a cast of one hundred background singers and dancers (almost all women, and many scantily clad) and two full orchestras. On opening night, just before the show, someone tries to kill Ware several times. Ellery summons police lieutenant Murdock of the homicide squad to investigate. During the show, a private detective and then Rita are murdered. Ellery hides this from the rest of the performers, claiming that the victims are just sick, and convinces Murdock to conduct his investigation while the revue continues; if the performance is stopped, Ellery will go broke.

The murders are solved just after the show ends. Just after that, Nancy, a pretty blond showgirl, tells Ellery and Murdock what she has attempted to tell Ellery several times throughout the show. She had a vital piece of information that would have solved the first murder much sooner and might have prevented the second murder. Now that the show is complete and a success, Ellery's attention is finally on her, and they plan to celebrate. As they exit the stage, Ellery gives a devilish grin.

== Cast ==
- Carl Brisson as Eric Lander
- Victor McLaglen as Bill Murdock
- Jack Oakie as Jack Ellery
- Kitty Carlisle as Ann Ware
- Dorothy Stickney as Norma Watson
- Gertrude Michael as Rita Ross
- Jessie Ralph as Mrs. Helene Smith
- Charles B. Middleton as Homer Boothby
- Gail Patrick as Sadie Evans
- Donald Meek as Dr. Saunders
- Toby Wing as Nancy
- Duke Ellington as himself

== Reception ==
In a contemporary review for The New York Times, critic Mordaunt Hall wrote: "It can boast of its lavish staging, certain tuneful melodies, and its host of attractive girls. But the mystery concerning its two murders is never particularly disturbing." In modern reviews Leslie Halliwell wrote: "Curious, stylish mixture of musical numbers, broad comedy and mystery. Dated, but fun." Leonard Maltin: "Arguably the smuttiest Hollywood musical ever made (filled with near-nudity and risqué dialogue), this offbeat pre-Code murder mystery is set backstage at Earl Carrol's Vanities, with detective McLaglen holding everyone under suspicion when someone is killed backstage on opening night." Pauline Kael: "A backstage musical with a murderer loose in the theatre—an unusual mixture of thriller and musical that is moderately effective both ways, though the doubling of the 30s conventions makes it plot-heavy and doubly antiqued."

Murder at the Vanities was a box-office disappointment for Paramount. It was released on DVD by Universal Pictures Home Entertainment, as part of a six-disc set entitled Pre-Code Hollywood Collection, on April 7, 2009. A Blu-Ray of Murder at the Vanities by itself was released by Kino Lorber on October 11, 2022.

== See also ==
- National Recovery Administration (NRA), the logo displayed at start of the film
