= Aristotle of Argos =

3rd-century BC Greek politician

Aristotle of Argos (or Aristoteles, Greek: Ἀριστοτέλης; fl. 3rd century BC), was a prominent political figure in Argos and a close associate of Aratus of Sicyon. In 224 BC, he was a key member of the faction in Argos that opposed the Spartan king Cleomenes III. Following Cleomenes' capture of the city, Aristotle led a bold attack on the Spartan garrison in an effort to restore Argos' affiliation with the Achaean League. His actions demonstrate his commitment to Argos' autonomy and his alignment with the Achaean League's interests.

Some historians suggest that Aristotle of Argos may be identical to Aristotle, the renowned philosopher and dialectician, who orchestrated the successful plot to assassinate Abantidas, the tyrant of Sicyon, in 252 BC. However, considering the philosopher's advanced age at that time, it is more plausible that Aristotle of Argos was a younger relative or son of the philosopher, rather than the famous Aristotle himself.
