= Arista, West Virginia =

Unincorporated community in West Virginia, United States

- Unincorporated community
- Location within the state of West Virginia Arista, West Virginia (the United States)
- Coordinates: 37°28′21″N 81°15′38″W
- Country: United States
- State: West Virginia
- County: Mercer
- Elevation: 2,480 ft (760 m)
- Time zone: UTC-5 (Eastern (EST))
  - Summer (DST): UTC-4 (EDT)
- Area codes: 304 & 681
- GNIS feature ID: 1553743

Arista is an unincorporated community and coal town in Mercer County, West Virginia, United States. Arista is located on West Virginia Route 10, 4 miles (6.4 km) north of Matoaka.

Arista was named for a mining official's wife.
