= Theaetetus of Cyrene =

Theaetetus of Cyrene (/ˌθiːɪˈtiːtəs/; Ancient Greek: Θεαίτητος ὁ Κυρηναῖος) was a Greek poet who flourished in the 3rd century BC.

Theaetetus is mentioned in an epigram by Callimachus, a fellow native of Cyrene. In Epigram 7 (in the edition of Pfeiffer), Callimachus writes:

ἦλθε Θεαίτητος καθαρὴν ὁδόν. εἰ δ᾽ ἐπὶ κισσὸν

τὸν τεὸν οὐχ αὕτη, Βάκχε, κέλευθος ἄλει,

ἄλλων μὲν κήρυκες ἐπὶ βραχὺν οὔνομα καιρὸν

φθέγξονται, κείνου δ᾽ Ἑλλὰς ἀεὶ σοφίην.

Theaetetus travelled a splendid path. If that path, Bacchus, leads not to thine ivy wreath - other men's names the heralds will voice a little while, but his skill Hellas will voice for ever.

The "ivy wreath" Callimachus mentions is the prize for dramatic competitions, from which it is possible to deduce that Theaetetus composed dramatic works. There is no reason to suspect, however, that he is not also the Theaetetus to whom six epigrams in the Palatine Anthology are ascribed.
