= Carl Brisson =

Danish actor (1893–1958)

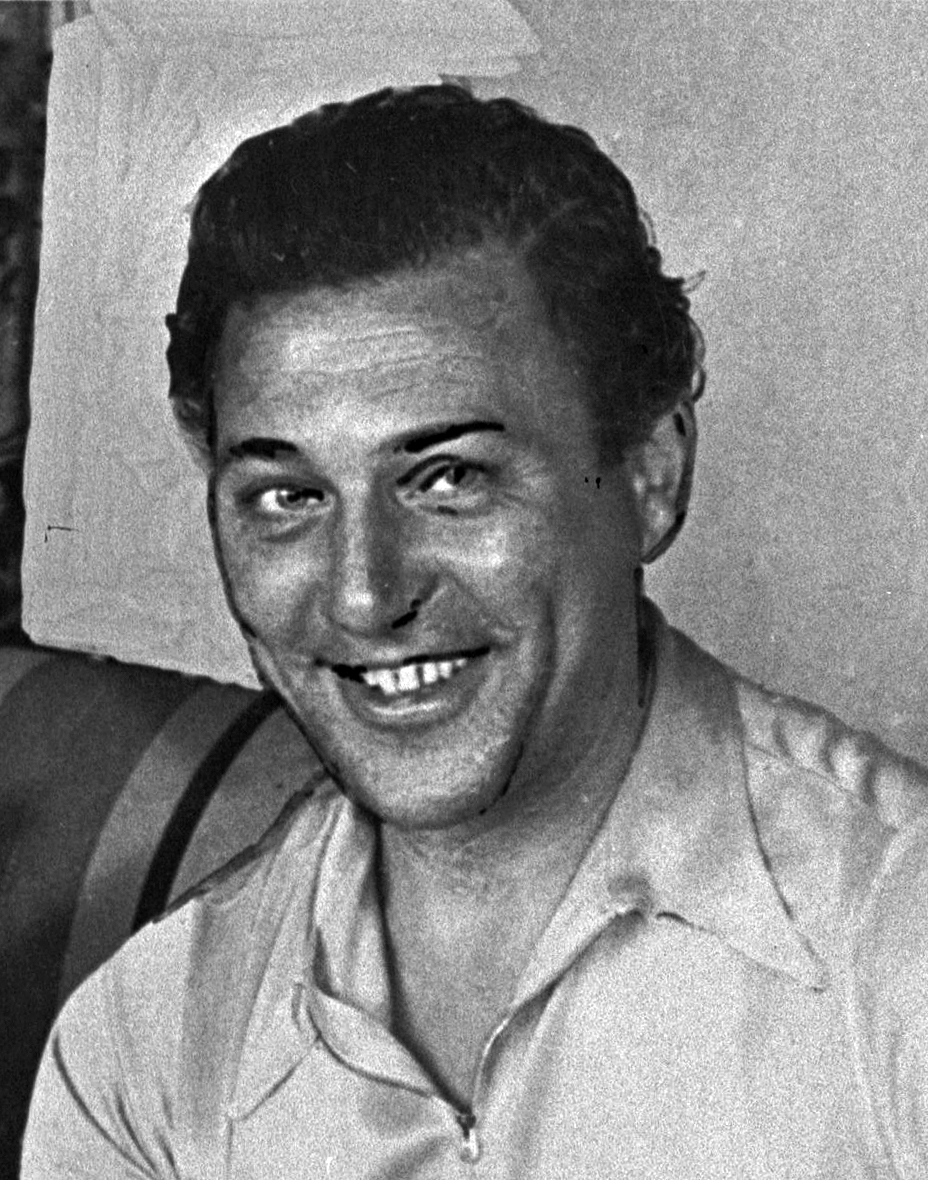
- Brisson in 1935
- Born: Carl Frederik Ejnar; 24 December 1893; Copenhagen, Denmark
- Died: 25 September 1958 (aged 64); Copenhagen, Denmark
- Occupations: Actor, Singer
- Years active: 1918–1935
- Spouse: Cleo Willard Brisson (m. 1915)
- Children: 1

Carl Brisson (24 December 1893 – 25 September 1958), born Carl Frederik Ejnar Pedersen, was a Danish film actor and singer. He appeared in 13 films between 1918 and 1935, including two silent films directed by Alfred Hitchcock. In the 1934 film Murder at the Vanities, he introduced the popular song "Cocktails for Two".

== Early years ==
Born in Copehnagen, Brisson was the son of Carl Pedersen and Kirsten Madstatter Pederseen. He had a brother. Before his acting and singing career, Brisson was a prizefighter. He won Denmark's amateur lightweight boxing championship when he was 15 and went on to become welterweight champion of Central Europe and Scandinavia. He boxed as Carl Pedersen, but when he became an entertainer he changed his last name to Brisson. That name "had been in Carl's family on his mother's side for a century, but went unused until Carl resurrected it for himself".

== Career ==
Brisson's stage debut came as a dancer when he performed with his sister in Denmark in 1916. He went on to sing in night clubs and revues while touring in South Africa and Sweden, and he performed in London and provincial music halls in England in 1921. An article in the South African Pictorial magazine in 1927 called him "the darling of the gods at the Palladium". Brisson's admirers included teenager Greta Lovisa Gustafsson (later known as actress Greta Garbo). Her locker at a shop where she worked "was covered with pictures" of Brisson. After she carved "GG loves CB" on Brisson's dressing-room door, he mentioned her to Mauritz Stiller, who then sought her for his next film.

Brisson attracted attention when he appeared as Prince Danilo in the 1923 London production of The Merry Widow at Daly's. He appeared in the same role when it was revived at the Lyceum Theatre the following year, and frequently reprised.

In August 1924, Brisson toured the provinces as Karl in Katja the Dancer, eventually returning to London to appear in The Apache at the London Palladium, and later made his British screen debut in Hitchcock's The Ring.

He starred in the "mystery show with music" radio program A Voice in the Night on the Mutual Broadcasting System that debuted on May 3, 1946.

== Personal life and death ==
Brisson was married to Cleo Willard Brisson from 1915 to his death, and was the father of producer Frederick Brisson and father-in-law of Frederick's wife, actress Rosalind Russell. He entered Municipal Hospital in Copenhagen on July 1, 1958, with jaundice. He died of jaundice there on September 26, 1958, aged 62. A requiem mass was offered in Copenhagen on September 29, 1958, with burial in West Cemetery.

== Honors ==
in 1949 Brisson received the Order of the Dannebrog from King Frederick IX of Denmark and the Swedish Order of Vasa.

== Filmography ==
- The Mysterious Footprints (1918)
- The Ring (1927)
- The Manxman (1929)
- The Triumph of the Heart (1929)
- The American Prisoner (1929)
- Knowing Men (1930)
- Song of Soho (1930)
- Prince of Arcadia (1933)
- Two Hearts in Waltz Time (1934)
- Murder at the Vanities (1934)
- All the King's Horses (1935)
- Ship Cafe (1935)
