= RKVV Aristos =

Aristos
- Full name: Rooms Katholieke Voetbal Vereniging Aristos
- Founded: January 11, 1955
- Dissolved: June 30, 1986
- Ground: Sportpark Sloten; Amsterdam
- Capacity: 2,000
Home colours

Rooms Katholieke Voetbal Vereniging Aristos was an amateur Dutch football club from the city of Amsterdam, established in 1955, and dissolved in 1986, who played their home games at the Sportpark Sloten in Amsterdam Nieuw-West. Its name was derived from 'Rooms Katholieke Voetbal Vereniging' (Roman Catholic Football Club in Dutch), and Aristos, Greek for "best", see Arete (excellence).

== Handball ==
The formerly associated Aristos Amsterdam Handball club is still active and one of the strongest in the region.
