= Aristotelian =

Aristotelian may refer to:

- Aristotle (384–322 BCE), ancient Greek philosopher
- Aristotelianism, a philosophical tradition inspired by the work of Aristotle
- Aristotelian ethics
- Aristotelian logic, an approach to formal logic that began with Aristotle
- Aristotelian physics, the form of natural philosophy described in the works of Aristotle
- Aristotelian Society, a British philosophical society
- Aristotelian theology
- Aristotelian tragedy
