= Ariston (physician) =

Ancient Greek physician of the 5th century BCE

Ariston (Ancient Greek: Ἀρίστων) was a physician of ancient Greece, of whose life no particulars are known, but who probably lived in the fifth century BCE, as Galen mentions him with three other physicians, who all (he says) lived in old times, some as contemporaries of Hippocrates, and the others before him.

Galen also says that he was by some persons supposed to be the author of the work in the Hippocratic Collection titled "On a Healthy Diet" (Περι Διαίτης Ὑγιεινῆς).

A medical preparation by a person of the same name is quoted by Cornelius Celsus and Galen.

The other Ariston mentioned by Galen is Aristo of Chios, a different person.
