= Aristotle of Chalcis =

Ancient Greek historical writer

Aristotle (Ancient Greek: Ἀριστοτέλης) of Chalcis in Euboea was a historical writer of ancient Greece. He is mentioned by the writer Harpocration as the author of a work on the islands of Euboea (Περὶ Εὐβοίας).

Some scholars over the years—mostly prior to the 19th century—have been inclined to think that this Aristoteles is not a distinct person, and that the work on Euboea ascribed to him is only another name for the Εὐβοέων πολιτεία of the more well known philosopher Aristotle. There is not broad scholarly consensus for this conjecture.
