= Barbara Sattler (philosopher) =

German philosopher

Barbara Michaela Sattler
- Born: 1974 (age 51–52)
- Awards: Whitney Humanities Center Fellowship, DAAD scholarship

Education
- Education: Free University of Berlin (PhD)

Philosophical work
- Era: 21st-century philosophy
- Region: Western philosophy
- School: Ancient philosophy
- Institutions: St Andrews University
- Main interests: Ancient philosophy, Aesthetics
- Website: https://www.st-andrews.ac.uk/~bs21/

Barbara Michaela Sattler (born 1974) is a Senior Lecturer in philosophy at St Andrews University. Her area of research is metaphysics and natural philosophy in the ancient Greek world.

== Career ==
From January to March 2017, she was an Institute of Advanced Study Fellow at St John's College, Durham.

Sattler was assistant professor at Yale University from 2007 to 2013, where she was a Fellow of the Whitney Humanities Center. She is a member of the editorial boards for The Philosophical Quarterly, Les Études platoniciennes and Archai: Journal on the origins of Western thought.

== Selected publications ==
- Sattler, Barbara Michaela (2016), "How natural is a unified notion of time? Temporal experience in early Greek thought", in Ian Philips (ed.), The Routledge Handbook of the Philosophy of Temporal Experience, Routledge, ISBN 9781138830745
- Sattler, Barbara (January 2014), "Contingency and Necessity: Human agency in Musil's The Man without Qualities", The Monist, vol. 97, Open Court for the Hegeler Institute, OCLC 808753315
- Sattler, Barbara (2013), "The Eleusinian Mysteries in Pre-platonic Thought. Metaphor, Practise and Imagery for Plato's Symposium", in Adluri, Vishwa (ed.), Philosophy and salvation in Greek religion, Religionsgeschichtliche Versuche und Vorarbeiten, Bd. 60., De Gruyter, pp. 151–190, ISBN 978-3110276350
- Sattler, Barbara (April 2012). "A Likely Account of Necessity, Plato's Receptacle as a Physical and Metaphysical Basis of Space". Journal of the History of Philosophy: 159–195. ISSN 0022-5053.
- Sattler, Barbara (2011), "Parmenides' System – the Logical Origins of his Monism", in Gurtler, Gary M; Wians, William Robert (eds.), Boston Area Colloquium in Ancient Philosophy, vol. 26, Brill, pp. 25–70, ISBN 978-9004207073
- Sattler, Barbara (2006), The emergence of the concept of motion : Aristotle's notion of kinesis as a reaction to Zeno's paradoxes and Plato's Timaeus, OCLC 180050479
