= Aristus (historian) =

Ancient Greek historian

Aristus (Ancient Greek: Ἄριστος) was an ancient Greek historian from Salamis, Cyprus who wrote a biography of Alexander the Great, in which he mentioned the embassy of the Romans to Alexander at Babylon.

That he lived a considerable time later than Alexander may be inferred from Strabo, although it is impossible to determine the exact time at which he lived. Some writers are inclined to believe that Aristus, the historian, is the same person as Aristus of Ascalon the academic philosopher, who was a contemporary and friend of Cicero, who taught philosophy at Athens and included Marcus Junius Brutus among his students. This philosopher moreover was a brother of the celebrated Antiochus of Ascalon. But the opinion which identifies the historian and philosopher with one another is mere hypothesis, supported by nothing but the circumstance that both bore the same name.
