= Aristé culture =

Pre-Columbian culture in South America

The Aristé culture is a pre-Columbian culture that has disappeared. It is generally located around the Oyapock River, in both French Guiana and Brazil, and seems to be particularly centered on Ouanary and the coastal Amapá region. It emerged around 350 CE and vanished following contact with Europeans, at the latest by the 18th century.

Similar to the neighboring Marajoara culture, the Aristé culture is renowned for its ceramics, especially those used in funerary practices. It is conventionally divided into three phases: Ancient Aristé (350 to 1000), Middle Aristé (700 to 1400), and Late Aristé (from the turn of the millennium to 1750). There is a possibility that it also includes a megalithic component.
