= Ariston (sculptor) =

Ancient Greek sculptor living before the 2nd century

Ariston (Ancient Greek: Ἀρίστων) was a sculptor of ancient Greece who, along with his brother and partner Telestas (Τελεστὰς), were the sculptors of a colossal statue of the Greek god Zeus which the Cleitorians dedicated at Olympia from the spoils of many captured cities.

The statue with its pedestal was about eighteen ancient Greek feet high. It bore an inscription, which is given by the ancient Greek geographer Pausanias, but in a mutilated state.
