= Ariston of Rhodes =

Roman ambassador and political figure (2nd century BCE)

Ariston (Ancient Greek: Ἀρίστων) of Rhodes was an ambassador of ancient Greece in the spring of 170 BCE with several others – notably Hagepolis and Pancrates – to the Roman consul Quintus Marcius Philippus, in Macedonia, to renew the friendship with the Romans, and clear his countrymen from the charges which had been brought against them.
