= Aristotle of Sicily =

Ancient Greek rhetorician

Aristotle (Ancient Greek: Ἀριστοτέλης) was a rhetorician of ancient Greece who wrote a work against the Panegyricus of Isocrates. His time is very uncertain; we know only that he lived somewhere between the 4th century BCE and the 3rd century CE, though it seems likely he lived closer to Isocrates in the 4th century BCE.

Throughout history, this Aristotle's works have sometimes been confounded with those of the more well known philosopher Aristotle. There was a work titled Technon Sunagoge (τεχνῶν συναγωγή), which was a historical collection of the art of rhetoric. This is traditionally attributed to the philosopher Aristotle, and printed among his works, however some scholars of the 18th and 19th centuries attributed this work to this, lesser-known Aristotle of Sicily. Later scholars considered this attribution dubious.
