= Ariston of Tyre =

Carthaginian friend of Hannibal (2nd century BCE)

Ariston (Ancient Greek: Ἀρίστων) of Tyre appears to have been a friend of the Carthaginian general Hannibal.

When Hannibal was staying at the court of Antiochus III the Great and meditating a fresh war against the Romans, the Roman–Seleucid War, he dispatched Ariston to Carthage to rouse his friends there. Hannibal, however, in case the messenger should be intercepted, gave him nothing in writing.

On Ariston's arrival at Carthage, the enemies of Hannibal soon conjectured the object of his presence from his frequent interviews with the men of the other party. The suspicions were at last loudly expressed, and Ariston was summoned to explain the objects of his visit. The explanations given were not very satisfactory, and the trial was deferred till the next day. But in the night Ariston fled the city, leaving behind a letter which he put up in a public place, and in which he declared that the communications he had brought were not for any private individual, but for the senate.
