= Aristotelia Peloni =

Greek political advisor (born 1978)

- Αριστοτελία Πελώνη

Deputy Government Spokesperson
- Incumbent
- Assumed office January 20, 2020
- Prime Minister: Kyriakos Mitsotakis

Government Spokesperson
- Acting
- In office February 28, 2021 – August 13, 2021
- Prime Minister: Kyriakos Mitsotakis
- Preceded by: Christos Tarantilis
- Succeeded by: Giannis Oikonomou

Personal details
- Born: 1978 (age 47–48) Mauromati, Boeotia, Greece
- Party: New Democracy
- Education: National and Kapodistrian University of Athens (BA); Panteion University (MS)

Aristotelia Peloni (Greek: Αριστοτελία Πελώνη; born Mavrommati, Boeotia 1978) is a Greek journalist, political consultant, politician andextra-parliamentary deputy government representative since January 20, 2020. She served as Alternate Government spokesperson of the Hellenic republic from February 28 to August 13, 2021.

== Biography ==
=== Early life ===
She was born in 1978, in Mavrommati, Boeotia. She studied at the Department of Communication and Media of the National and Kapodistrian University of Athens, completing her master's degree at the Department of International and European Studies at Panteion University. She submitted her thesis to Panteion University on Greece–United States relations in the 1960s. This thesis was published in a book in 2010, by Polis Publications, entitled "Ideology Versus Realism: American Policy Towards Greece, 1963-1976".

=== Career ===
She has been working as a journalist since 1998, starting with News and freelance reporting. She later began to write articles on cultural issues, working in the cultural section of the newspaper. In 2006, she was transferred from the cultural to the political department, where she was assigned diplomatic reporting.

In 2016, she joined Kathimerini, taking over the reporting from the New Democracy party. In addition to Greek, she is fluent in Spanish and English.
