= United Air Lines Flight 624 =

1948 aviation accident

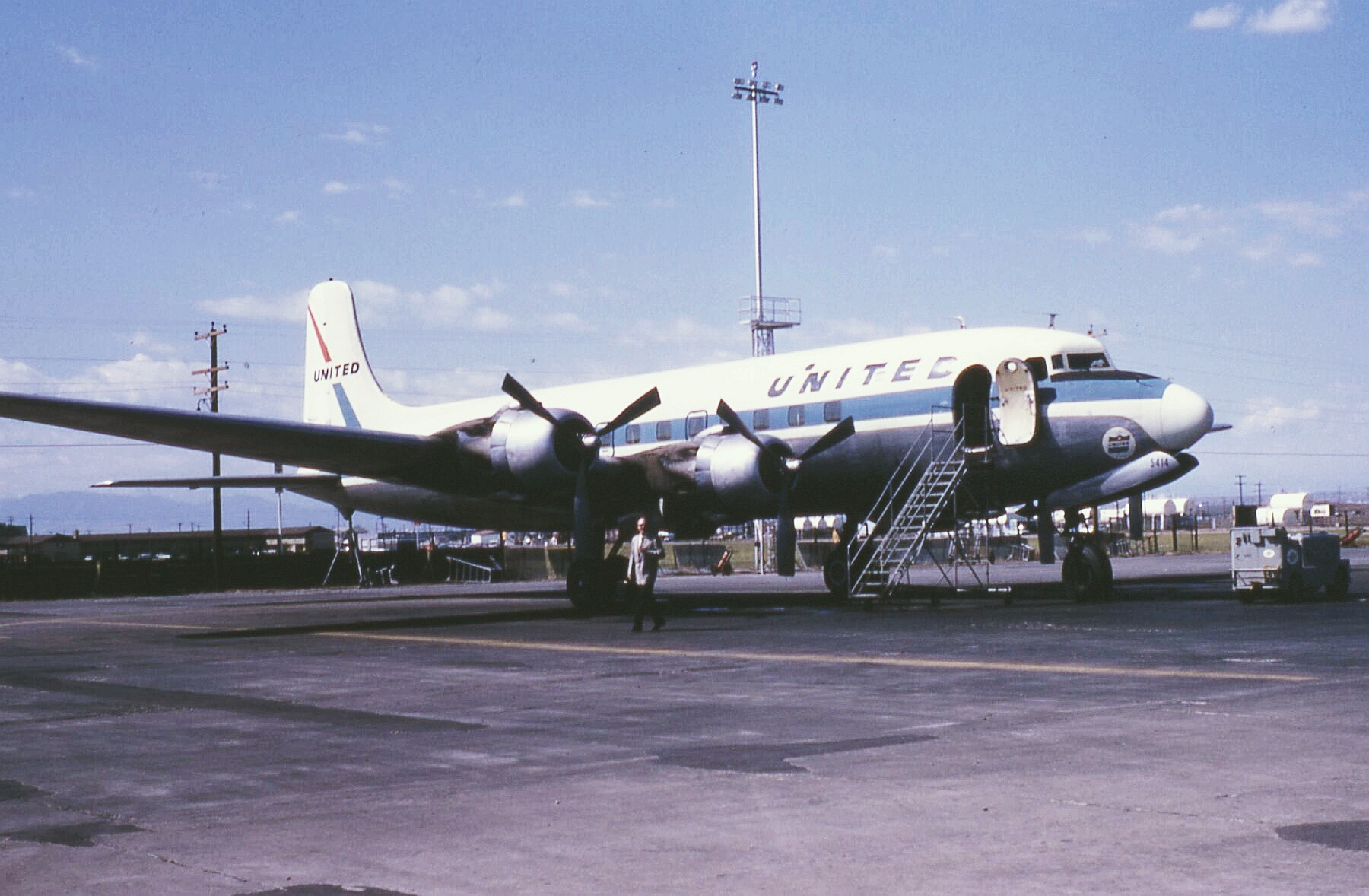
- A DC-6 similar to the aircraft involved in the accident

Accident
- Date: June 17, 1948
- Summary: False fire warning led to CO_{2} fire extinguisher deployment; subsequent crew incapacitation
- Site: Conyngham Township, Columbia County, Pennsylvania, United States; 40.820427°N 76.361042°W

Aircraft
- Aircraft type: Douglas DC-6
- Aircraft name: Mainliner Utah
- Operator: United Air Lines
- Registration: NC37506
- Flight origin: Lindbergh Field, San Diego, United States
- 1st stopover: Los Angeles International Airport, California, United States
- Last stopover: Chicago Municipal Airport, Illinois, United States
- Destination: LaGuardia Airport, New York City, United States
- Occupants: 43
- Passengers: 39
- Crew: 4
- Fatalities: 43
- Survivors: 0

United Air Lines Flight 624 was a scheduled domestic passenger flight from San Diego, California, to New York City, with stopovers in Los Angeles and Chicago. The four-engined, propeller-driven Douglas DC-6 crashed at 1:41 pm Eastern Daylight Time on June 17, 1948, outside Aristes, Pennsylvania, resulting in the deaths of all 4 crew members and 39 passengers on board. The crew had deployed the aircraft's CO_{2}-based fire extinguisher system, without opening the pressure relief valves designed to ventilate CO_{2} out of the cabin. The part-incapacitated crew then began an emergency descent and subsequently crashed into a hillside.

== Background ==
The aircraft, a Douglas DC-6 registered as NC-37506, had been purchased brand new from Douglas by United Air Lines in March 1947. In November 1947, all DC-6 aircraft were grounded following two in-flight fires: one involving United Air Lines Flight 608, which resulted in 52 fatalities, and another involving an American Airlines flight that landed safely. The accident aircraft returned to service on 3 June 1948, following authorization by the Civil Aeronautics Administration (CAA).

Smoke detectors in operation around the time of the accident were found to be unreliable. This had resulted in some emergency landings, where on later inspection, no fire was actually present. In April 1948, the CAA allowed operators to disconnect faulty detectors that were indicating too many false positives. United Air Lines decided not to disconnect the detectors, but had experienced 44 false positives from the start of January 1948 to the start of May 1948.

The aircraft had a CO_{2}-based fire extinguisher system, which deployed CO_{2} into a compartment below the cabin and cockpit when activated by the flight crew. This compartment was pressurized like the cabin, and air could move between pressurized compartments. This meant that when the fire extinguisher system was deployed, CO_{2} could escape from the under-floor compartment into the cabin and cockpit, which could cause passenger and crew incapacitation. To prevent this, the DC-6 was equipped with cabin pressure relief valves to ventilate the cabin. These pressure relief valves had to be manually operated, and this was included in the procedure for the fire extinguisher system, in the step before activating the CO_{2} selectors.

The pilot oxygen masks fitted to the aircraft were of the rebreather type, which mixes oxygen from storage tanks with the air already present in the cockpit. However, the fire extinguisher procedure also instructed the crew to turn off the oxygen supply when deploying the CO_{2} system, so using the oxygen masks would not have increased the amount of oxygen available to the pilots.

== Flight ==
United Air Lines Flight 624 was a domestic flight from San Diego to New York City, with stopovers in Los Angeles and Chicago. A change of crew occurred at Chicago, and the flight departed at 10:44 for LaGuardia Airport, with 39 passengers and 4 crew onboard. It then climbed normally up to its cruising altitude of 17,000 feet. The crew's last routine air traffic control communication occurred at 12:27, when they acknowledged a descent clearance. Four minutes later, crew from another United flight heard unidentified shouts of "New York" and "This is an emergency descent". Some elements of the transmission were unintelligible, but investigators concluded that this was likely from Flight 624 and also included mentions of the fire extinguisher system being discharged.

The aircraft was observed to be in a shallow descent by witnesses, until around 200 feet above ground, when it started to climb and turn to the right. As the aircraft encountered higher terrain, it increased its climb until it struck a hillside three miles from Mount Carmel, with an explosion occurring after impact. All 43 occupants on board were killed. Among the passengers were Broadway theatre impresario Earl Carroll and his girlfriend, actress Beryl Wallace, plus Henry L. Jackson, men's fashion editor of Collier's Weekly and co-founder of Esquire.

== Investigation ==
The Civil Aeronautics Board (CAB) opened an investigation into the accident and sent investigators to the crash site. The investigation included multiple public hearings, witness testimony, and analysis from the Federal Bureau of Investigation, the National Bureau of Standards and Douglas itself. It also included evidence on the effects of CO_{2} on humans.

The final report from the investigation was published on 2 August 1949. It found that a fire warning was triggered in the cockpit, which then caused the flight crew to deploy the fire extinguisher system and initiate an emergency descent; they did this without operating the pressure release valves first. Due to the crew's behavior during the descent, such as flying past suitable emergency landing locations and towards elevated terrain, the report found that it was likely that the crew became incapacitated from the concentration of CO_{2} in the cockpit. Post-accident analysis of the aircraft's components found no evidence of a fire onboard, so the report concluded that the fire warning was erroneous.

The CAB concluded that the probable cause of the accident was "the incapacitation of the crew by a concentration of CO_{2} gas in the cockpit". It stated that the existing procedure for the fire extinguisher system had not considered that the crew would likely be experiencing a higher workload with a possible onboard fire; which may lead to steps being missed, such as the manual activation of the pressure relief valves. It stated that in general, emergency procedures should take into account the possibility of human error as a result of a higher workload.

== Aftermath ==
After the accident, Douglas redesigned the fire extinguisher system to automatically open the pressure relief valves with the rest of the system. It also designed an additional valve to further reduce the concentration of CO_{2} in the cabin after the system had been deployed.

=== Legal action ===
Four lawsuits were filed against United after the crash, one was found in favor of United, with the other three being found in favor of the plaintiffs. One of these lawsuits was filed by the widow of Anthony DeVito, a passenger onboard the flight, for damages pursuant to a Pennsylvania statute: "Whenever death shall be occasioned by unlawful violence or negligence, and no suit for damages be brought by the party injured during his or her lifetime the widow of any such deceased * * * may maintain an action for and recover damages for the death thus occasioned". A cross-claim was made by United against Douglas for breach of contract and shared negligence if a decision was made against them in the original lawsuit.

It was found that pilots conducting test flights for Douglas following the November 1947 groundings reported adverse effects caused by the CO_{2}-based fire extinguisher system, despite having activated the pressure relief valves. A chief test pilot later stated that he was "almost completely out" during one such test. After these test flights, Douglas fitted an additional relief valve to provide improved ventilation; they also commissioned an independent report, which was finalized in February 1948 with several recommendations. The report recommended sharing its information with the CAA and all operators of the DC-6. However, a Douglas chief test pilot wrote "Do not discuss with CAA" on the letter containing the report, before sending it to two further test pilots; the report was not sent to United before the accident, but Douglas stated that it had been discussed with United's flight safety engineer, though this was denied by the engineer. According to court testimony, any such discussion may have only related to a small part of the report and not its entire contents. Separately, Douglas' chief pilot said, "I probably did not spend more than, oh, an hour on the report; a report of that nature cannot be properly evaluated in an hour". Some other key personnel within Douglas had no knowledge of either the report, or the underlying CO_{2} issue identified during the test flights.

The jury awarded $300,000 (equivalent to $3,721,154 in 2025) in favor of the widow against United, but this was later reduced to $160,000 (equivalent to $1,984,615 in 2025) by the court. The jury found in favor of Douglas against United in the cross-claim, but the court later granted a new trial for the cross-claim after misconduct from Douglas' legal counsel may have influenced the jury's findings. United stated that it relied upon Douglas to prevent CO_{2} from entering the cabin. However, it was found that this reliance did not reduce United's duty towards its passengers.

== See also ==
- Centralia, Pennsylvania
- List of accidents and incidents involving commercial aircraft
- TWA Flight 513
- United Air Lines Flight 608
