= Ariston of Corinth =

Ariston (Ancient Greek: Ἀρίστων) of Corinth, son of Pyrrhichus, was one of those apparently who made their way into Syracuse during the second year of the Sicilian Expedition, in 414 BCE.

He is named once by the historian Thucydides, in his account of the sea-fight preceding the arrival of the second armament in 413 BCE, and described as the most skillful helmsman on the side of the Syracusans. He suggested to them the stratagem of retiring early, giving the men their meal on the shore, and then renewing the combat unexpectedly, which in that battle gave them their first naval victory.

The writers Plutarch and Diodorus Siculus ascribe to him the invention or introduction at Syracuse of the important alterations in the build of their galleys' bows, also mentioned by Thucydides, and said by him to have been previously used by the Corinthians in the action off Erineos. According to Plutarch, he fell in battle just as the victory was won, in the last, decisive sea-fight.
