= Bernhard Viiding =

Estonian journalist, prosaist and poet

Bernhard Viiding (7 June 1932 – 10 March 2001) was an Estonian journalist, prosaist and poet.

Bernard Viiding was born in Ariste village, Valjala Parish, on the island of Saaremaa. In 1957 he graduated from the University of Tartu in Estonian philology. 1958-1968 he worked at the editorial office of the newspaper Rahva Hääl. From 1968 to 1984, he was the responsible editor of the newspaper Televisioon, and he also worked at Estonian Television as one of the compilers of cultural programs. 1991-1994 he was the executive director of the journalism company Viser.

== Works ==
- Kurist (1985)
- Vastuvõtuõhtu (1988)
- Metsavenna elu (1991)
- poetry of collection: Tähe tüdruk (1998)
- poetry of collection: Laev kaindlus (1998)
- poetry of collection: Katsu ilma kartsata elu peale minna (1999)
- poetry of collection: Punane must (2000)
