= Aristo of Alexandria =

1st-century Greek philosopher

Aristo
- Ἀρίστων ὁ Ἀλεξανδρεύς
- Born: Alexandria, Egypt

Philosophical work
- School: Peripatetic school

Aristo (or Ariston) of Alexandria (Greek: Ἀρίστων ὁ Ἀλεξανδρεύς; fl. c. 87 BC) was a Peripatetic philosopher who lived in the 1st century BC. According to Philodemus, he was a pupil of Antiochus of Ascalon (or possibly his brother Aristus). Strabo, a later contemporary, relates a story where both Ariston and Eudorus, a contemporary of his, had claimed to have written a work on the Nile River, but that the two works were so nearly identical that the authors charged each other with plagiarism. Who was right is not said, though Strabo seems to be inclined to think that Eudorus was the guilty party.
