= Earl Carroll Theatre =

Theater in Manhattan, New York (1922–1990)

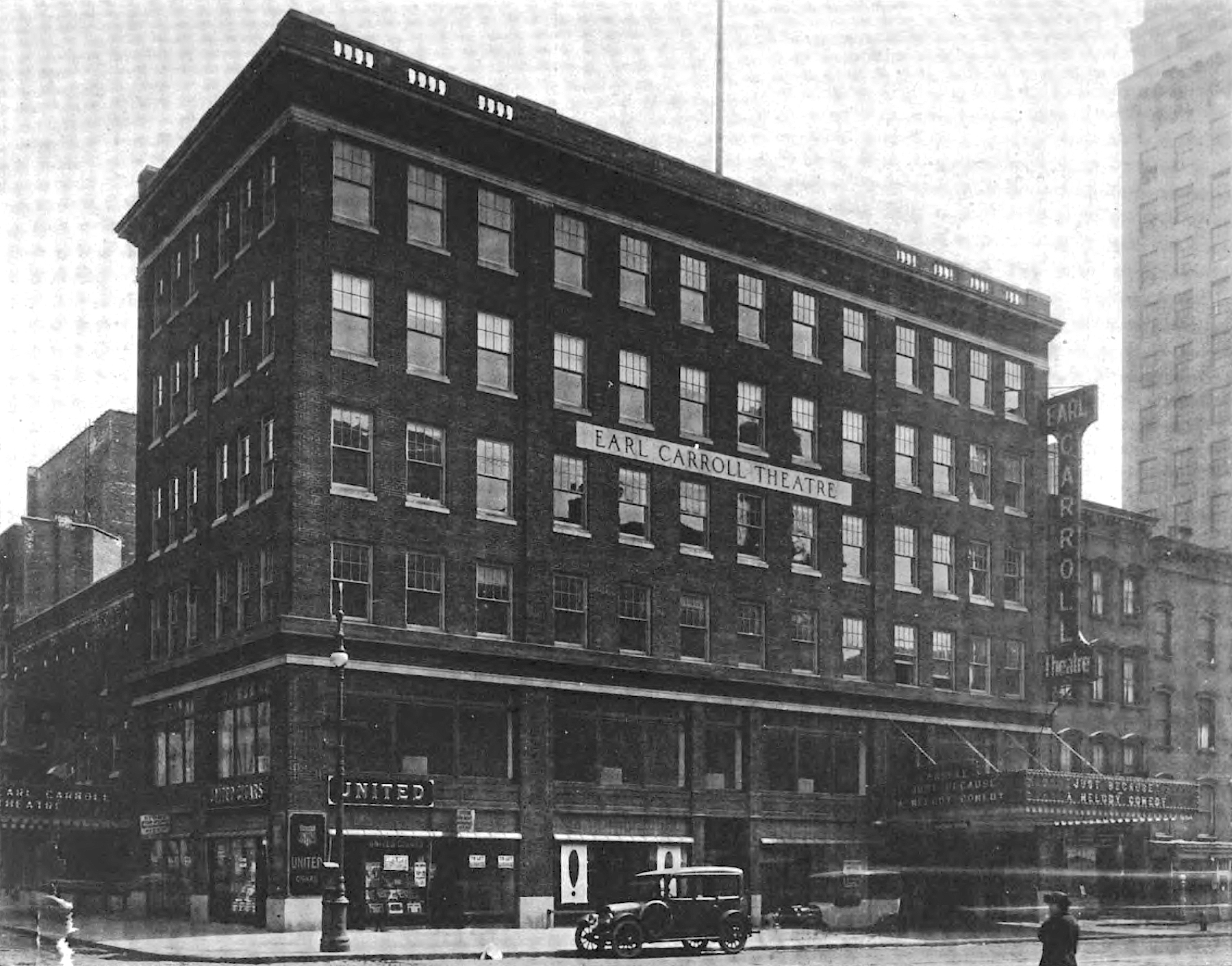
- The building in 1922

General information
- Location: 753 Seventh Avenue, Manhattan, New York, United States
- Coordinates: 40°45′39″N 73°58′59″W
- Opened: 1922

The Earl Carroll Theatre was a Broadway theatre at 753 Seventh Avenue near 50th Street in the Theater District of Midtown Manhattan in New York City. Built by impresario Earl Carroll and designed by architect George Keister, it opened on February 25, 1922, and was highly successful for a number of years until it was demolished and rebuilt on a lavish scale. It reopened in August 1931 with Carroll's billing that it was "the largest legitimate theater in the world." However, the facility's operating costs proved astronomical and it went into foreclosure in early 1932 after which it was acquired by producer Florenz Ziegfeld who renamed it the Casino Theatre. The Casino was the site of a very successful revival of Ziegfeld's production of Show Boat in 1932. However, Ziegfeld too went bankrupt only a short time later. The property was auctioned in foreclosure on August 18, 1933 to the Mutual Life Insurance Company for $1 million.

== The French Casino ==
In 1934, after being acquired by a business consortium consisting of Louis F. Blumenthal, Charles H. Haring and Jack Shapiro the theater was refurbished, and on December 30, 1934 reopened as the French Casino night club. The chic nightclub offered dinner and a Broadway cabaret show and became very successful for several years. Its first revue was titled Revue Folies Bergeres. The French Casino operated until its closure in 1937. Soon after, the Broadway producer Billy Rose acquired the building and renamed it Casa Manana, after the previous incarnation at the Frontier Centennial in Fort Worth, Texas. It opened with the show, "Let's Play Fair", a successful bid for Rose's ambition to secure the Aquacade show for the New York World's Fair. Under the helm of Rose, the venue traded until June 1939. The French Casino reacquired the theater in late 1939 but was unsuccessful and closed in 1940. Thereafter, the building was converted into retail space and became a Woolworth Store. The building was demolished in 1990.

== Description ==
The building was six stories, made of dark brick with retail stores on the street level and offices above. It was one hundred feet (30 m) long and about thirty feet (9.1 m) deep, behind which the theater wing stretches to the left. Between the fourth and fifth floors, a big sign on the facade said "Earl Carroll Theatre" in capital letters. The right side of the office building had a marquee over the theater entrance, which is through the office building. There was another marquee at the theater wing on the left.
