= Aristes, Pennsylvania =

Unincorporated community in Pennsylvania, US

- Census-designated place
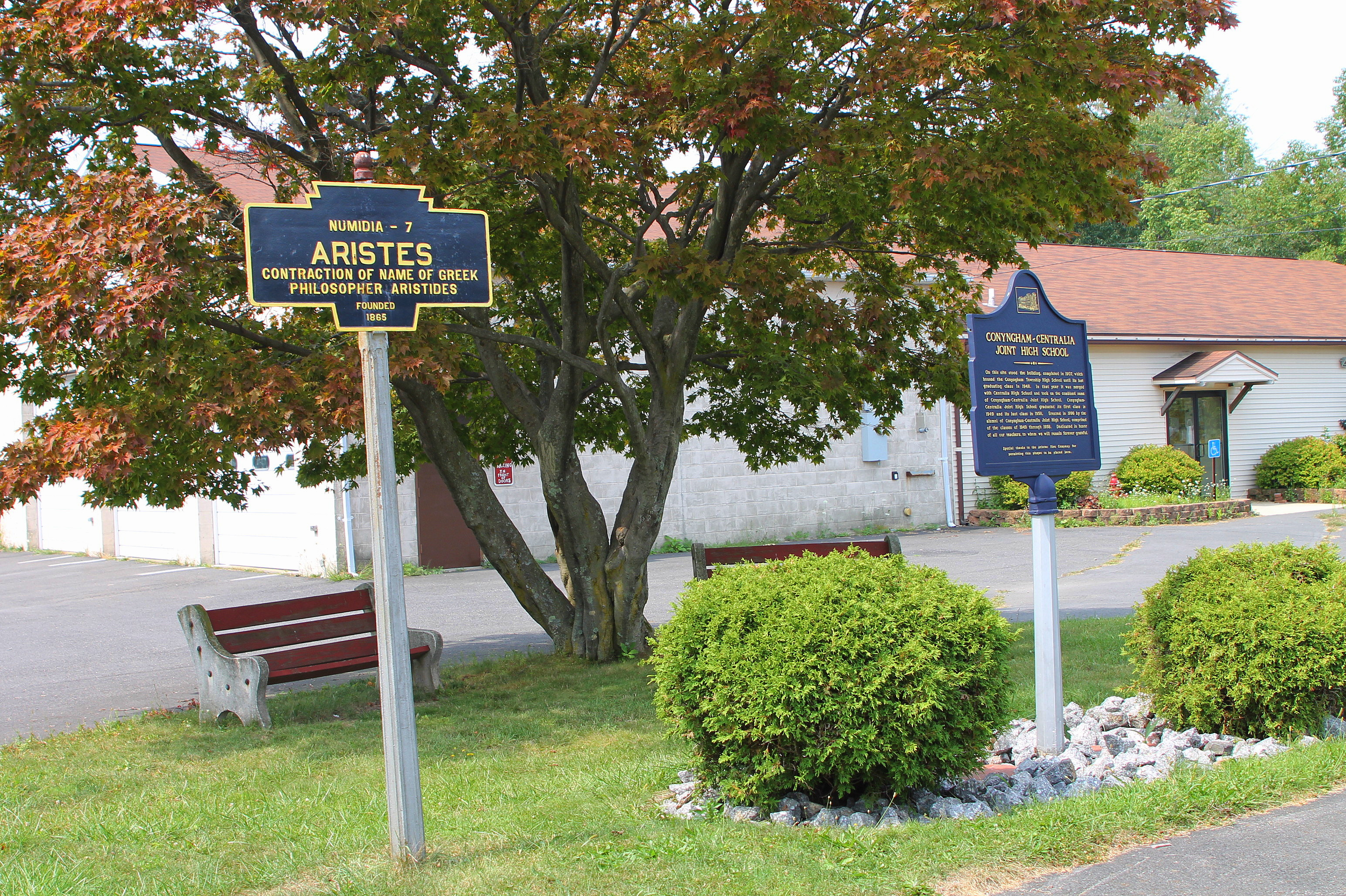
- Aristes

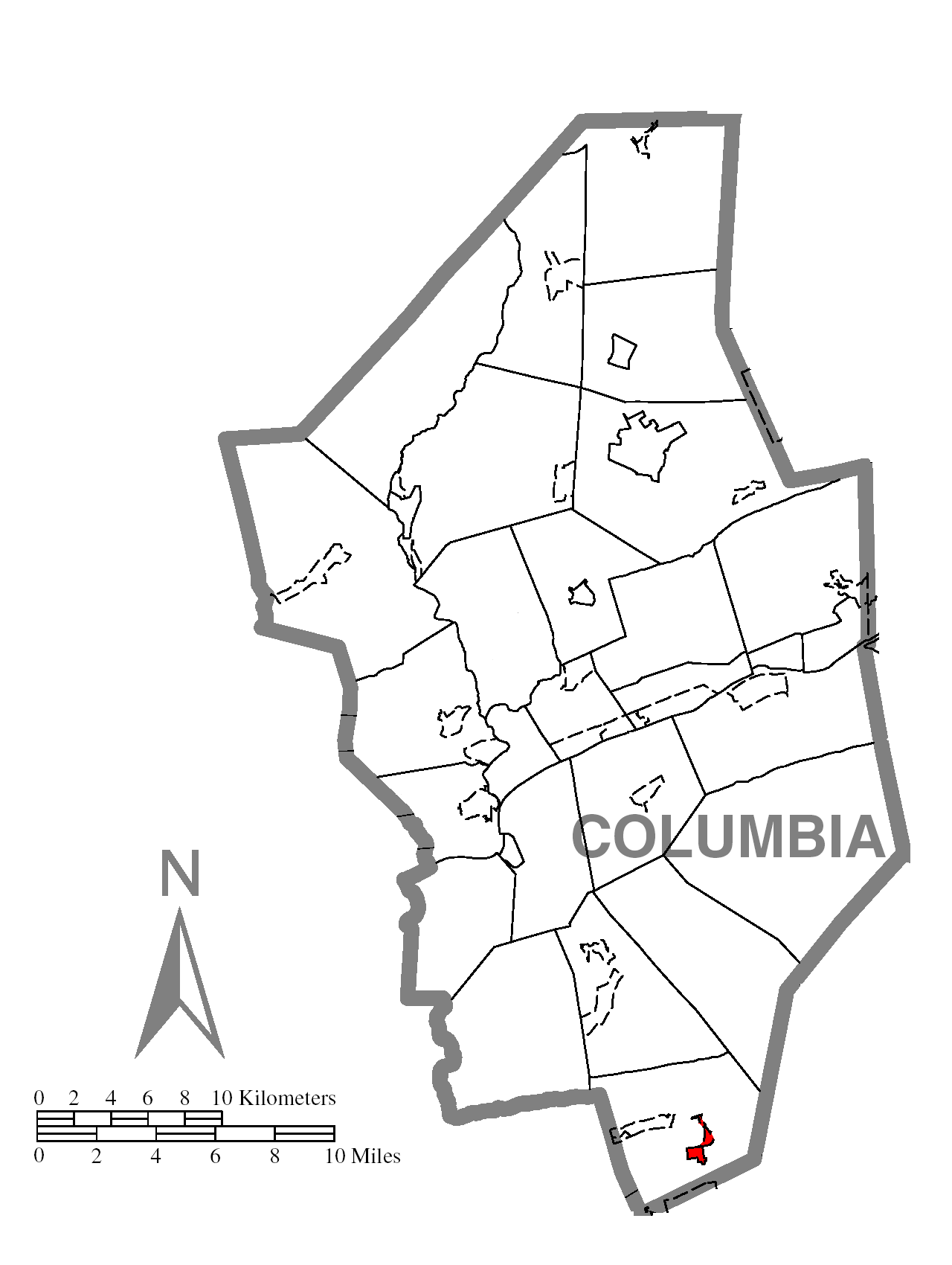
- Location within Columbia County

- Location within the U.S. state of Pennsylvania Aristes (the United States)
- Coordinates: 40°49′8″N 76°20′22″W
- Country: United States
- State: Pennsylvania
- County: Columbia
- Township: Conyngham

Area
  - Total: 0.37 sq mi (0.97 km^{2})
  - Land: 0.37 sq mi (0.96 km^{2})
  - Water: 0 sq mi (0.00 km^{2})
- Elevation: 1,750 ft (530 m)

Population (2020)
  - Total: 256
  - Density: 687.8/sq mi (265.56/km^{2})
- Time zone: UTC-5 (Eastern (EST))
  - Summer (DST): UTC-4 (EDT)
- ZIP code: 17920
- Area code: 570
- FIPS code: 42-02968
- GNIS feature ID: 1168385

Aristes is a census-designated place (CDP) in Conyngham Township, Columbia County, Pennsylvania, United States. It is part of Northeastern Pennsylvania. The population was 256 at the 2020 census. It is part of the Bloomsburg-Berwick micropolitan area. Aristes is located adjacent to the famous "ghost town" of Centralia.

== History ==
Around the year 1800, the Red Tavern was built along the Old Reading Road, which ran from Catawissa to Reading. In 1865, the owner of the Red Tavern laid out a village which he called "Montana". When a post office was established here in 1897, the name of the town was changed to "Aristes", a contraction of the name Aristides, a Greek statesman.

In 1948, United Airlines Flight 624 hit a high-voltage powerline and crashed near Aristes. Notable victims of the crash included Broadway theatre impresario Earl Carroll and his girlfriend, actress Beryl Wallace; Henry L. Jackson, men's fashion editor of Collier's Weekly magazine and co-founder of Esquire magazine; and Venita Varden Oakie, the former wife of actor Jack Oakie.

== Geography ==
Aristes is located in southern Columbia County at 40°49′8″N 76°20′22″W (40.818984, -76.339374), east of the center of Conyngham Township and northeast of Centralia. According to the United States Census Bureau, the Aristes CDP has a total area of 0.37 square miles (0.96 km^{2}), all land. Aristes is served by Pennsylvania Route 42. The CDP's southern half is mostly forested.

== Demographics ==
Historical population
| Census | Pop. | Note | %± |
|---|---|---|---|
| 2000 | 230 | | — |
| 2010 | 311 | | 35.2% |
| 2020 | 256 | | −17.7% |
U.S. Decennial Census

As of the census of 2000, there were 230 people, 108 households, and 65 families residing in the CDP. The population density was 1,172.5 inhabitants per square mile (452.7/km^{2}). There were 118 housing units at an average density of 601.5 per square mile (232.2/km^{2}). The racial makeup of the CDP was 99.57% White, and 0.43% from two or more races.

There were 108 households, out of which 21.3% had children under the age of 18 living with them, 47.2% were married couples living together, 11.1% had a female householder with no husband present, and 39.8% were non-families. 36.1% of all households were made up of individuals, and 23.1% had someone living alone who was 65 years of age or older. The average household size was 2.13 and the average family size was 2.77.

In the CDP, the population was spread out, with 17.0% under the age of 18, 6.1% from 18 to 24, 23.9% from 25 to 44, 27.8% from 45 to 64, and 25.2% who were 65 years of age or older. The median age was 48 years. For every 100 females, there were 79.7 males. For every 100 females age 18 and over, there were 78.5 males.

The median income for a household in the CDP was $21,607, and the median income for a family was $27,500. Males had a median income of $31,875 versus $21,875 for females. The per capita income for the CDP was $13,302. About 15.6% of families and 18.8% of the population were below the poverty line, including 63.3% of those under the age of eighteen and 6.5% of those sixty five or over.

== Education ==
The school district is the North Schuylkill School District.
