= Aristas =

Mythical son of Parthaon

In Greek mythology, Aristas (Ancient Greek: Ἀρίστα) was an Arcadian king as the son of Parthaon, descendant of King Lycaon of Arcadia. He was the father of Erymanthus, ancestor of Psophis.
