= Aristophon =

Aristophon (Ancient Greek: Ἀριστόφων) was the name of a number of different people of ancient Greece:

- Aristophon (painter), 5th-century BCE painter and son of Aglaophon
- Three men sometimes called "Aristophon of Athens", all of whom were described as "orators" within the same century or so:
  - Aristophon of Azenia, prominent Athenian orator of the 4th century BCE
  - Aristophon of Colyttus, prominent Athenian orator of the 4th century BCE
  - Aristophon of Athens, an Athenian orator distinct from the previous two orators
- Aristophon (comic poet), a playwright of the Middle Comedy
