= Mikon =

Mikon or Micon may refer to:

- Micon, ancient Greek sculptor
- Mikon, California, unincorporated community
- NEG Micon, former Danish wind turbine manufacturer
