= Anakes =

Anakes were a group of either two or three deities worshiped in Attica and Argos possibly associated with protection of cities and protection at sea or travel in general. They are often seen as attic versions of the divine twins castor and Pollux and were the same twins in the constellation Gemini. The word is a title which means lords or kings, likely because they were the sons of Zeus. Some have associated the Anakes cult with worship of the goddess Helen. They were on a sacrificial calendar from the island of Thorikos where Helen and her brother stayed shortly after they rescued her from Theseus. Helen and the Dioscouri were also worshiped in a festival called Anakeia where animals were sacrificed. It is also possible that the name refers to three specific gods, but evidence for this is lacking.

== Other associated deities ==
The divine twins were a common motif in the ancient Mediterranean commonly linked to the Tyndaridae (Castor and Pollux) and the Cabeiri.

== See also ==
- Anax
