= Aristophon of Athens =

Ancient Greek orator living around the 4th century BCE

Aristophon (Ancient Greek: Ἀριστόφων) was the eponymous archon in the year 330 BCE. Second century BCE philosopher Theophrastus calls this Aristophon an orator. That this man, who was archon in the same year in which Demosthenes delivered his oration on the crown, was not the same as Aristophon of Colyttus is clear from that oration itself, in which Aristophon of Colyttus is spoken of as deceased.

Whether this Aristophon was actually an orator, as Theophrastus wrote, is considered doubtful by some scholars, since it is not mentioned anywhere else. The scholar David Ruhnken conjectures that the word rhetor (ῥήτωρ) was inserted over the centuries into a manuscript of Theophrastus by someone who believed that either Aristophon of Colyttus or Aristophon of Azenia was meant in that passage.
