= Micon =

5th-century BC Greek painter

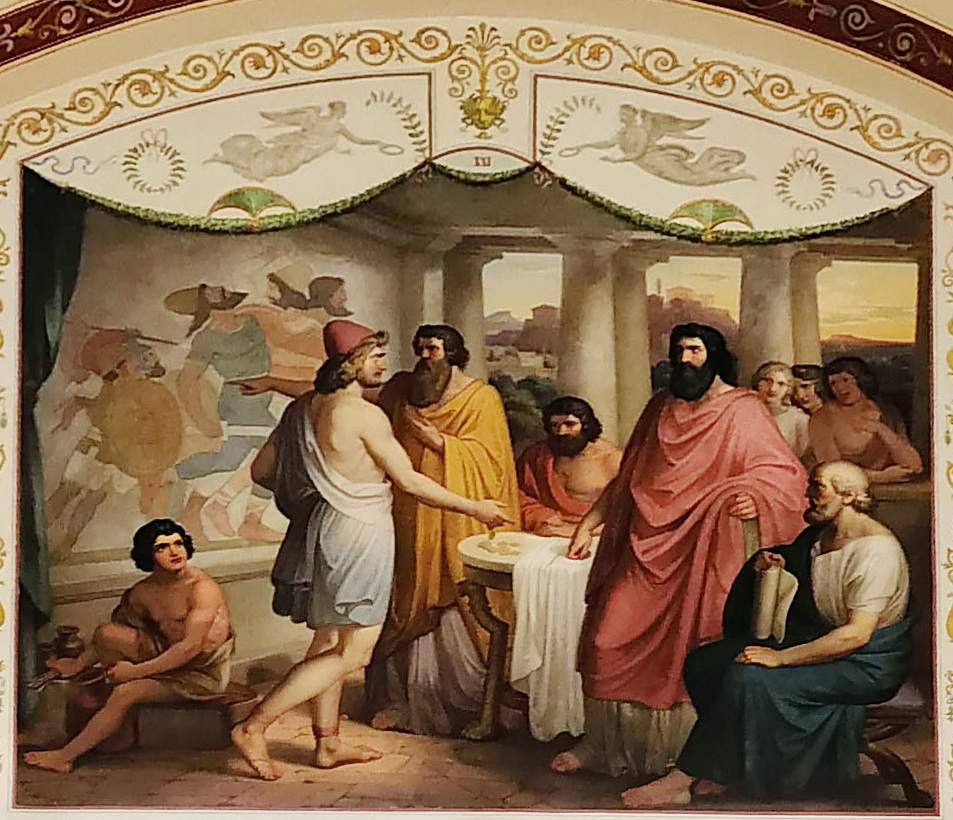

Micon the Younger of Athens, simply Micon or Mikon (Ancient Greek: Μίκων) was an ancient Greek painter and sculptor from the middle of the 5th century BC. He was closely associated with Polygnotus of Thasos, in conjunction with whom he adorned the Stoa poikile ("Painted Portico"), at Athens, with paintings of the Battle of Marathon and other battles. He also painted in the Anakeion at Athens. His daughter was the painter Timarete.
