= Azenia (Attica) =

Azenia (Ancient Greek: Ἀζηνία) was a deme of ancient Attica between Anaphlystus and Sunium.

It was probably situated in the bay of which Sunium forms the eastern cape. Opposite this bay is a small island, now called Patroklos (or Gaidouronisi), formerly the Island or Rampart of Patroclus (Πατρόκλου χάραξ or νῆσος), because a fortress was built upon it by Patroclus, who commanded on one occasion the ships of Ptolemy Philadelphus.

== People ==
- Aristophon of Azenia
