= Ambulia =

Ancient Greek mythological epithet

Ambulia, Ambulius and Ambulii (Ancient Greek: Ἀμβουλία, Ἀμβούλιος and Ἀμβούλιοι) were cultic epithets under which the Spartans worshiped the Greek deities Athena, Zeus, and the Dioscuri. The meaning of the name (the three are merely the feminine, masculine, and plural forms of the same word) is uncertain, but it has been supposed to be derived from the Greek anaballo (ἀναβάλλω), and to designate those divinities as the delayers of death.
