= Aristophon (painter) =

Aristophon was a Greek painter, mentioned by Pliny the Elder.

== Life ==
Aristophon was the son and pupil of the elder Aglaophon, and brother of Polygnotus. He was a native of Thasos. Pliny, who places him among the painters of the second rank, mentions two works by him: one showing Ancaeus wounded by the boar and mourned over by his mother Astypalaea, and another containing figures of Priam, Helen, Ulysses, Deiphobus, Dolon, and Credulitas.

Plutarch names Aristophon as the painter of a picture of Alcibiades in the arms of Nemea; Athenaeus however says it was by Aglaophon.

== Sources ==
Verdegem, Simon (2010). Plutarch's Life of Alcibiades: Story; Text and Moralism. Leuven University Press. ISBN 9789058677600.
