= Anakeion =

Temple in ancient Athens

The Anakeion or Anacaeum (from the Greek Ἀνάκειον), also known as the Sanctuary of the Dioskouroi, was a temple in Athens, which was situated near the Acropolis and dedicated to Castor and Pollux.

== Name and location ==
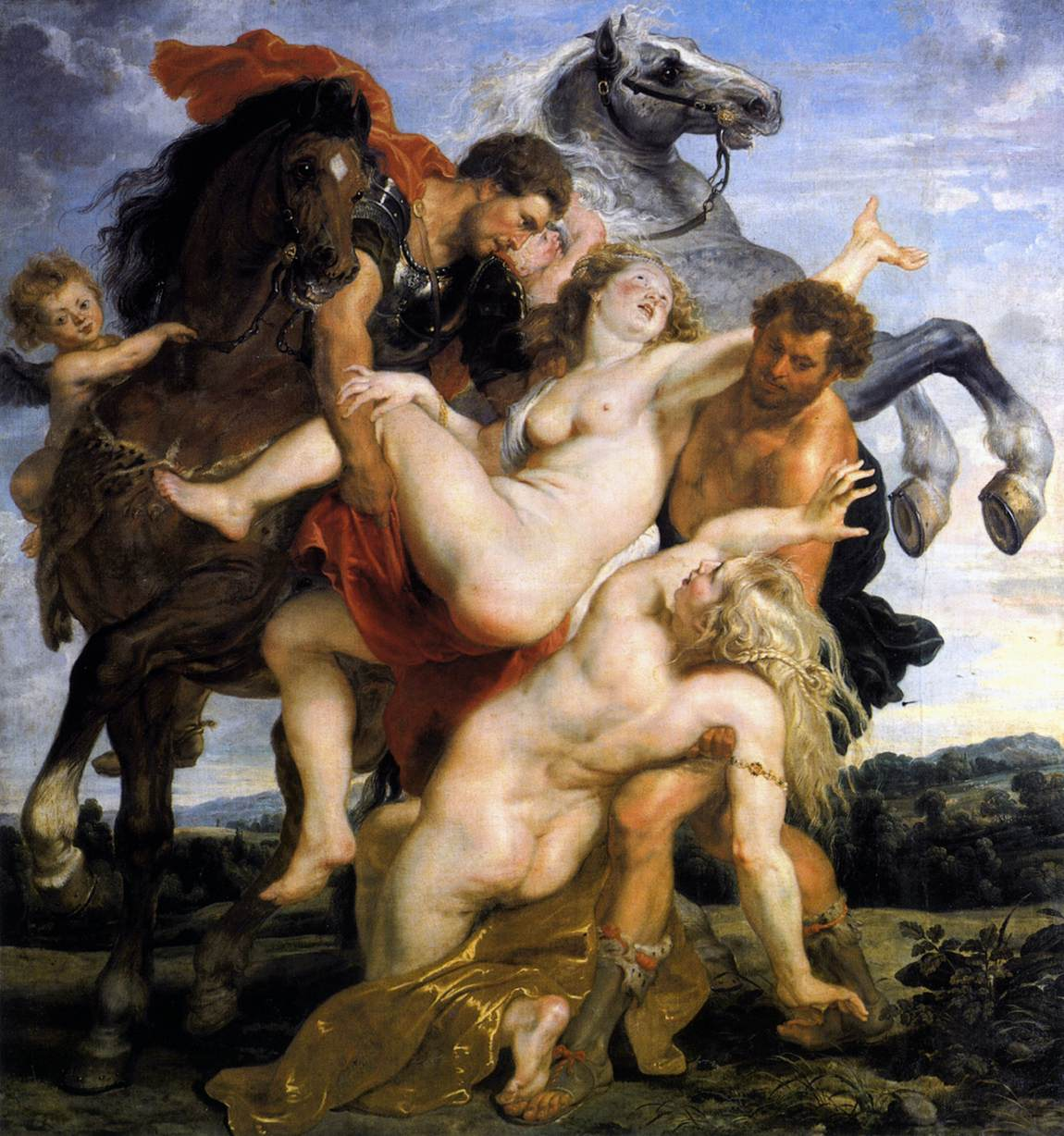
The Rape of the Daughters of Leucippus by Peter Paul Rubens. Alte Pinakothek

The name of the temple derives from the Greek Ἄνακες (an archaic form of ἄνακτες, "lords" or "kings"), the title by which the Dioskouroi, Castor and Pollux, twin sons of Zeus and Leda, were commonly known in Attica.

The Old Agora, the predecessor of the Classical Agora, was used in the fifth century and before as a rallying point, and references in Andokides and Thucydides to musters at the Anakeion in 415 and 411 BCE have led scholars to conclude that the Anakeion may have lain within the vicinity of the Old Agora, perhaps to the east of the Acropolis. (Note: The position of the Old Agora is disputed, and it may instead have lain north or north-east of the Acropolis.)

== Decoration ==
The decoration of the Anakeion, according to Pausanias, fell to Mikon and Polygnotos. The former depicted the Argonauts, the followers of Jason, with particular attention to Akastos and his horses. Polygnotos depicted the Rape of the Leukippides: the forcible abduction and marriage of Phoebe and Hilaeira, daughters of Leukippos, by the Dioskouroi. This painting may have earned him his Athenian citizenship.
