= Aglaophon =

Aglaophon (Ancient Greek: Ἀγλαοφῶν, romanized: Aglaophôn) was an ancient Greek painter, born on the island of Thasos. He was the father and instructor of Polygnotus. He had another son named Aristophon. As Polygnotus flourished before the 90th Olympiad, Aglaophon probably lived around the 70th Olympiad, that is, around the late 6th or early 5th century BC. Quintilian praises his paintings, which were distinguished by the simplicity of their coloring, as worthy of admiration on other grounds besides their antiquity.

== Aglaophon the Younger ==
There was an Aglaophon who flourished in the 90th Olympiad, according to Pliny, and his statement is confirmed by a passage of Athenaeus from which we learn that he painted two pictures, in one of which Olympias and Pythia, as the presiding geniuses of the Olympic and Pythian Games, were represented crowning Alcibiades; in the other, Nemea, the presiding deity of the Nemean games, held Alcibiades on her knees. Alcibiades could not have gained any victories much before the 91st Olympiad in 416 BC. It is therefore exceedingly likely that this artist was the son of Aristophon, and grandson of the older Aglaophon, as among the Greeks the son generally bore the name not of his father but of his grandfather. Plutarch names Aristophon as the author of the picture of Nemea and Alcibiades. He may perhaps have assisted his son. This Aglaophon was, according to some, the first artist to represent the goddess Victory with wings.
