= Aristophon of Colyttus =

Ancient Greek orator living around the 4th century BCE

Aristophon (Ancient Greek: Ἀριστόφων ὁ Κολλυτεύς, romanized: Aristóphon ho Kolluteús, lit. 'Aristophon the Collytian') was a native of the deme of Collytus, a great orator and politician, whose career is for the most part contemporaneous with that of Demosthenes. It was this Aristophon whom Aeschines served as a clerk, and in whose service he was trained for his public career.

This Aristophon is often confused with the other orators in Athens around this time named "Aristophon". Lives of the Ten Orators (spuriously attributed to Plutarch) mentions an orator of this name, whom some scholars have taken to indicate this Aristophon, however other scholars believe this incorrect, and that he is referring to Aristophon of Azenia.

This orator is often mentioned by Demothenes, though he gives him the distinguishing epithet "the Collytian" (ὁ Κολλυτεύς) only once, and he is always referred to as a man of considerable influence and authority.

As an orator he is ranked with Diopeithes and Chares of Athens, the most popular men of the time at Athens. There are some passages in Demosthenes where it is uncertain whether he is speaking of Aristophon the Azenian or the Collytian.
