= Polygnotus =

5th-century BC Greek painter

Polygnotus (/pɒlɪɡˈnoʊtəs/; Ancient Greek: Πολύγνωτος ὁ Θάσιος, romanized: Polúgnōtos ho Thásios) was an ancient Greek painter active in the middle of the 5th century BC. Later scholars of the Classical World considered him to be one of the first great painters, sometimes even the inventor of the artform.

== Life ==
He was the son and pupil of Aglaophon. He was a native of Thasos but was adopted by the Athenians and admitted to their citizenship.

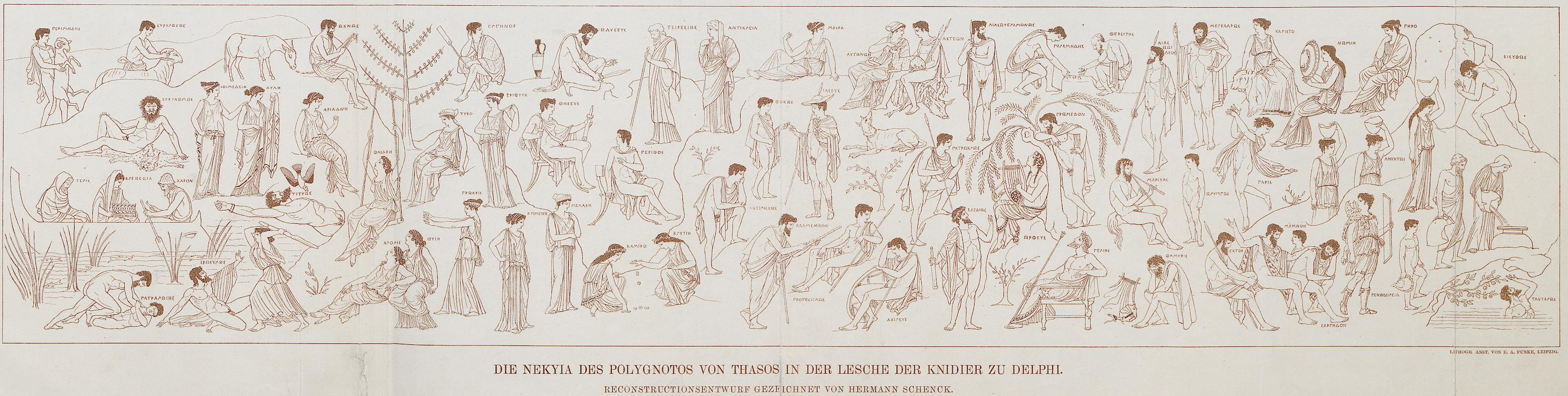
Reconstruction of Nekyia by Polygnotus 1892

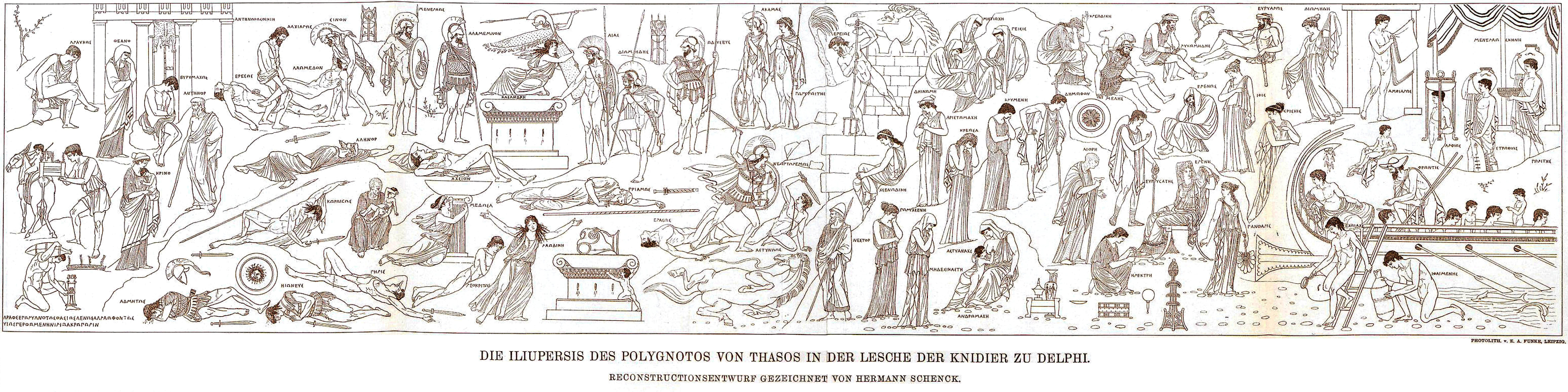
Reconstruction of Iliupersis by Polygnotus 1893

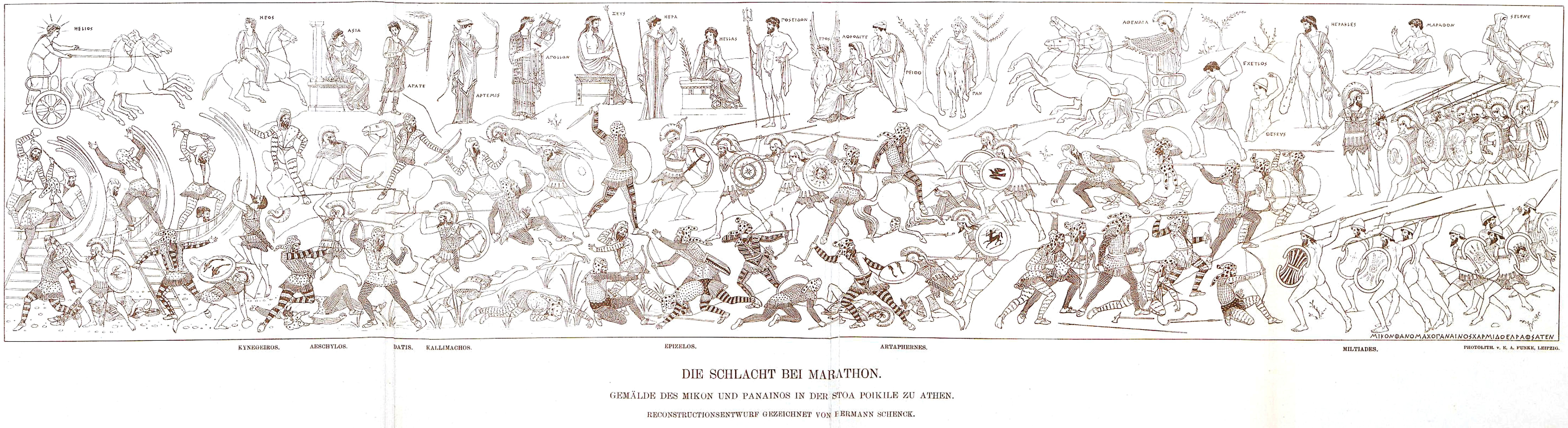
Reconstruction of Marathon by Polygnotus 1895

During the time of Cimon, Polygnotus painted for the Athenians a picture of the taking of Troy on the walls of the Stoa Poikile and another of the marriage of the daughters of Leucippus in the Anacaeum. Plutarch mentions historians and the poet Melanthius attest that Polygnotus did not paint for money but rather out of a charitable feeling towards the Athenian people. In the hall at the entrance to the Acropolis, other works of his were preserved. The most important of his paintings were his frescoes in the Lesche of the Knidians, a building erected at Delphi by the people of Cnidus. The subjects of these were the visit to Hades by Odysseus and the taking of Troy.

The traveller Pausanias recorded a careful description of these paintings, figure by figure. The foundations of the building have been recovered in the course of the French excavations at Delphi. Some archaeologists have tried reconstructing the paintings from this evidence rather than their colours. The figures were detached and rarely overlapping, ranged in two or three rows one above another, and the further were not smaller nor dimmer than the nearer. Therefore, it seems that the paintings of this time were executed on almost precisely the same plan as contemporary sculptural reliefs.

== Legacy ==
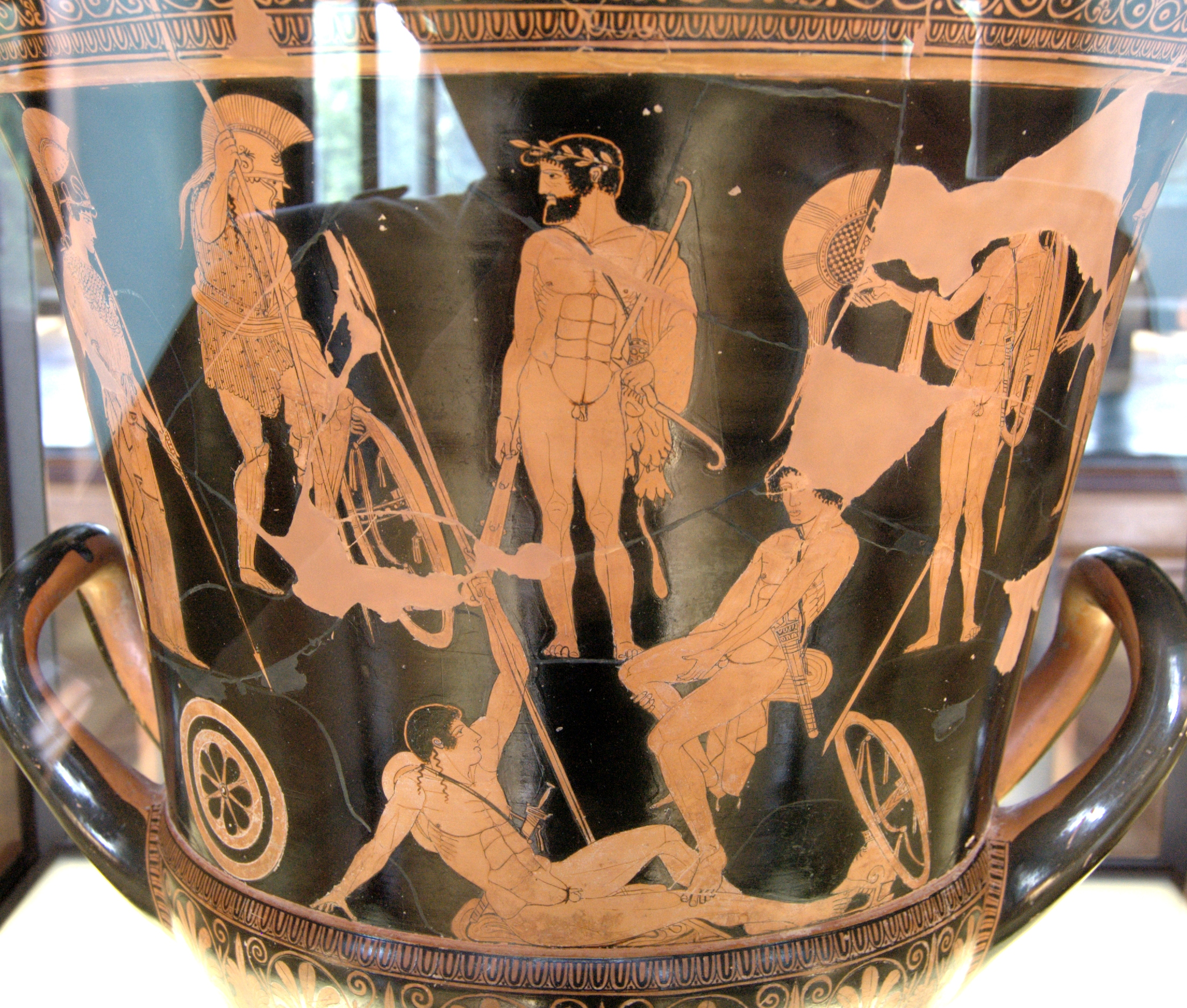
The Niobid Krater, circa 460-450 BC. With its complex perspective and contemplative poses, scholars believe this vase-painting bears the influence of Polygnotus' style.

Polygnotus was among the first Greek painters to produce large-scale murals for public buildings. Throughout Classical Antiquity, he was highly respected for the innovations he made to painting. Theophrastus called him the "inventor" of painting, while Quintilian said he was one of the first great painters, "whose works deserve inspection for something more than their mere antiquity."

According to Aristotle, his excellence lay in the beauty of his drawing of individual figures, especially in his art's "ethical" and ideal character. He was among the earliest painters to attempt depicting three-dimensional scenes. Whereas prior artists had placed their figures on a simple groundline, and treated the blank areas around their figures as empty space, Polygnotus arranged his figures on different levels, posing them in a landscape made up of transparent water and rocky land.
