= Castor and Pollux =

Greek mythical twins

- Twin gods, patrons of sailors, associated with horsemanship
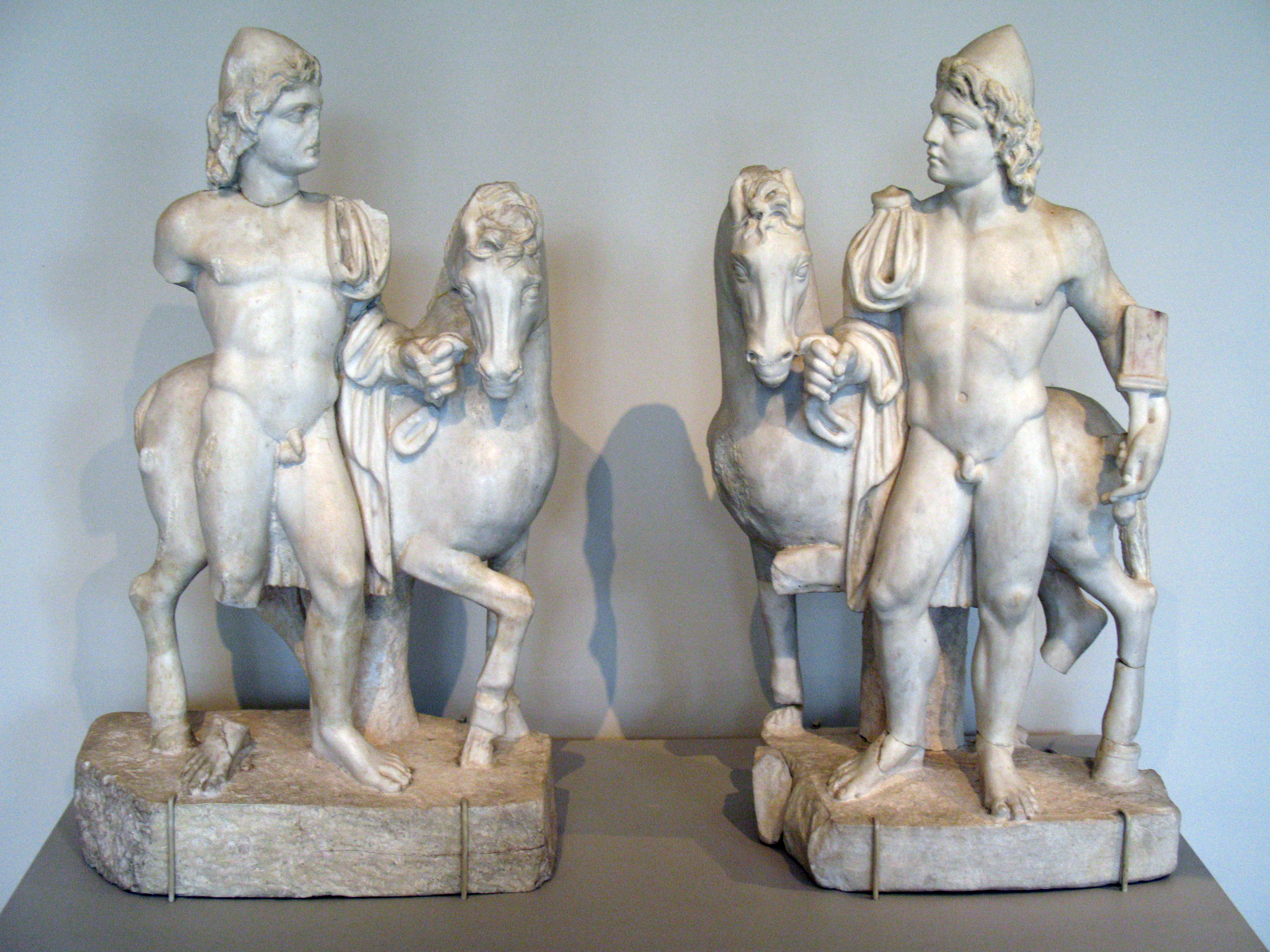
- Statues of Castor and Pollux (3rd century CE)
- Other names: Anakes; Anaktes; Dioskouroi (Latin, Dioscuri); Gemini; Castores; Tyndarids; Polydeuces (Latin, Pollux); The Two Gods
- Major cult center: Anakeion
- Mount: Horses
- Gender: Male
- Festivals: Anakeia or Anakeion; Feast of the Dioskouroi (July 15)

Genealogy
- Parents: Leda (mother); Tyndareus (father of Castor); Zeus–Jupiter (father of Pollux)
- Siblings: Timandra, Phoebe, Philonoe, Helen of Troy and Clytemnestra

Equivalents
- Etruscan: Kastur and Pultuce

Castor (Note: /ˈkæstər/ KAS-tər; Latin: Castōr; Ancient Greek: Κάστωρ, romanized: Kástōr, lit. 'beaver'.) and Pollux (Note: /ˈpɒləks/ POL-əks; Latin: Pollūx.) (or Polydeuces) (Note: /ˌpɒlɪˈdjuːsiːz/ POL-ih-DEW-seez; Ancient Greek: Πολυδεύκης, romanized: Polydeúkēs, lit. 'much sweet [wine]'.) are twin half-brothers in Greek and Roman mythology, known together as the Dioscuri or Dioskouroi. (Note: /ˌdaɪəˈskjʊəraɪ, daɪˈɒskjʊraɪ, -ri/ DY-ə-SKURE-e(y)e, dy-OSK-yuu-ry, -ree; Latin: Dioscūrī; Ancient Greek: Διόσκουροι, romanized: Dióskouroi, lit. 'sons of Zeus', from Dîos ('Zeus') and koûroi ('boys').)

Their mother was Leda, but they had different fathers; Castor was the mortal son of Tyndareus, the king of Sparta, while Pollux was the divine son of Zeus, who seduced Leda in the guise of a swan. The pair are thus an example of heteropaternal superfecundation. Though accounts of their birth are varied, they are sometimes said to have been born from an egg, along with their sister Helen of Troy.

In Latin, the twins are also known as the Gemini ("twins") or Castores, as well as the Tyndaridae or Tyndarids. (Note: Ancient Greek: Τυνδαρίδαι, romanized: Tundarídai.) Pollux asked Zeus to let him share his own immortality with his twin to keep them together, and they were transformed into the constellation Gemini. The pair were regarded as the patrons of sailors, to whom they appeared as St. Elmo's fire. They were also associated with horsemanship, in keeping with their origin as the Indo-European horse twins.

== Birth ==
There is much contradictory information regarding the parentage of the Dioscuri. In the Homeric Odyssey, they are the sons of Tyndareus alone, but they were sons of Zeus in the Hesiodic Catalogue of Women. The conventional account (attested first in Pindar's Nemean Odes) combined these paternities so that only Pollux was fathered by Zeus, while Leda and her husband Tyndareus conceived Castor. This explains why they were granted an alternative immortality. The figure of Tyndareus may have entered their tradition to explain their archaic name Tindaridai in Spartan inscriptions, or Tyndaridai in literature, in turn occasioning incompatible accounts of their parentage. Their other sisters were Timandra, Phoebe, and Philonoe.

Castor and Pollux are sometimes both mortal, sometimes both divine. One consistent point is that if only one of them is immortal, it is Pollux. In Homer's Iliad, Helen looks down from the walls of Troy and wonders why she does not see her brothers among the Achaeans. The narrator remarks that they are both already dead and buried back in their homeland of Lacedaemon, thus suggesting that at least in some early traditions, both were mortal. Their death and shared immortality offered by Zeus was material of the lost Cypria in the Epic cycle.

The Dioscuri were regarded as helpers of mankind and held to be patrons of travellers and of sailors in particular, who invoked them to seek favourable winds. Their role as horsemen and boxers also led to them being regarded as the patrons of athletes and athletic contests. They characteristically intervened at the moment of crisis, aiding those who honoured or trusted them.

== Classical sources ==
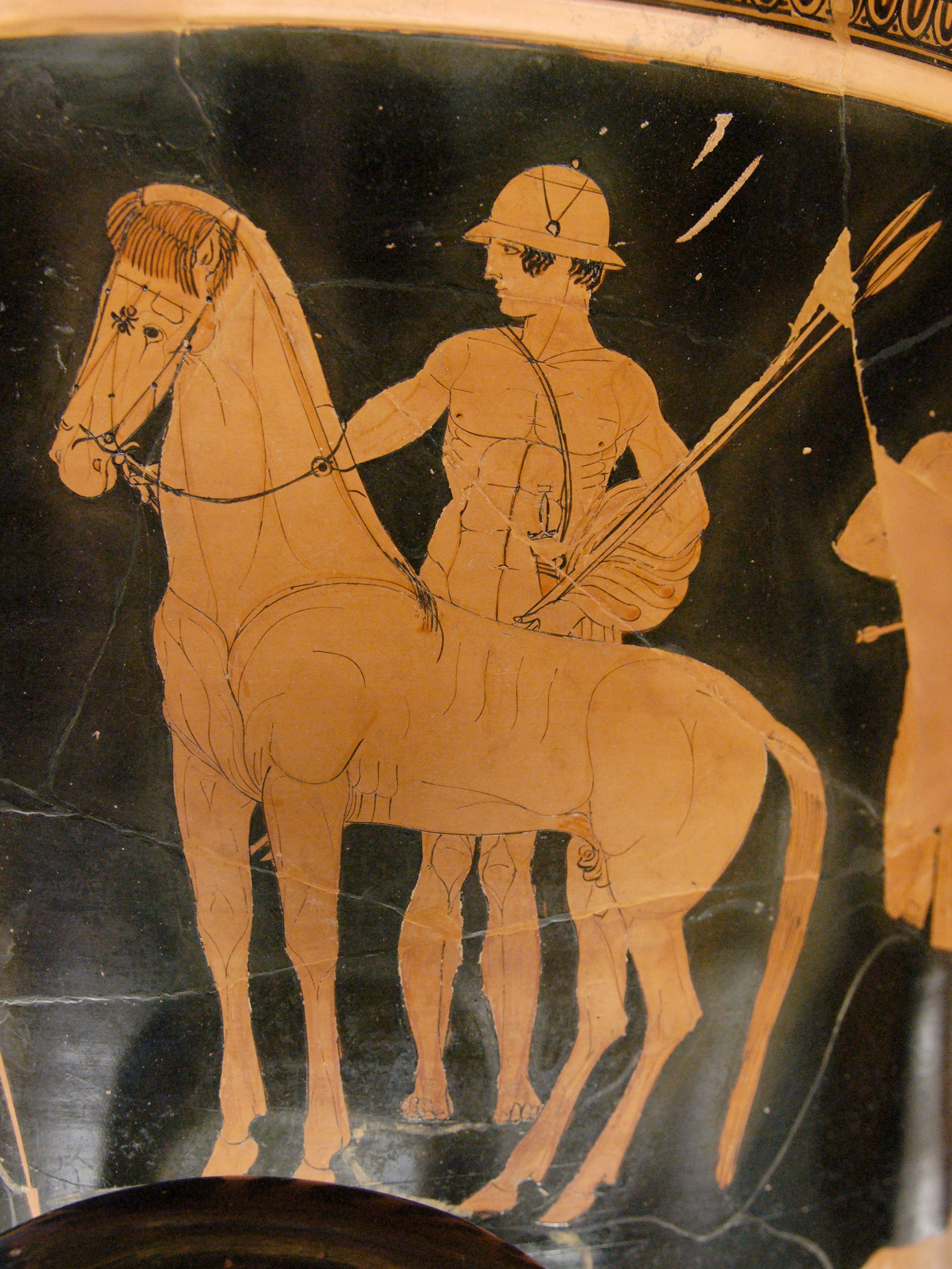
Castor on a calyx krater of c. 460–450 BCE, holding a horse's reins and spears and wearing a pilos-style helmet

Ancient Greek authors tell a number of versions of the story of Castor and Pollux. Homer portrays them initially as ordinary mortals, treating them as dead in the Iliad:

"... there are two commanders I do not see,
Castor the horse breaker and the boxer
Polydeuces, my brothers ..."

– Helen, Iliad

but in the Odyssey they are described as both being alive, even though "the grain-bearing earth holds them". The author describes them as "having honour equal to gods", living on alternate days because of the intervention of Zeus. In both the Odyssey and in Hesiod, they are described as the sons of Tyndareus and Leda. In Pindar, Pollux is the son of Zeus, while Castor is the son of the mortal Tyndareus. The theme of ambiguous parentage is not unique to Castor and Pollux; similar characterisations appear in the stories of Herakles and Theseus. The Dioscuri are also invoked in Alcaeus' fragment 34a, though whether this poem antedates the Homeric Hymn to the twins is unknown. They appear together in two plays by Euripides, Helen and Elektra.

Cicero tells the story of how Simonides of Ceos was rebuked by Scopas, his patron, for devoting too much space to praising Castor and Pollux in an ode celebrating Scopas' victory in a chariot race. Shortly afterwards, Simonides was told that two young men wished to speak to him; after he had left the banqueting room, the roof fell in and crushed Scopas and his guests.

According to the ancient sources the horse of Castor was named Cyllarus.

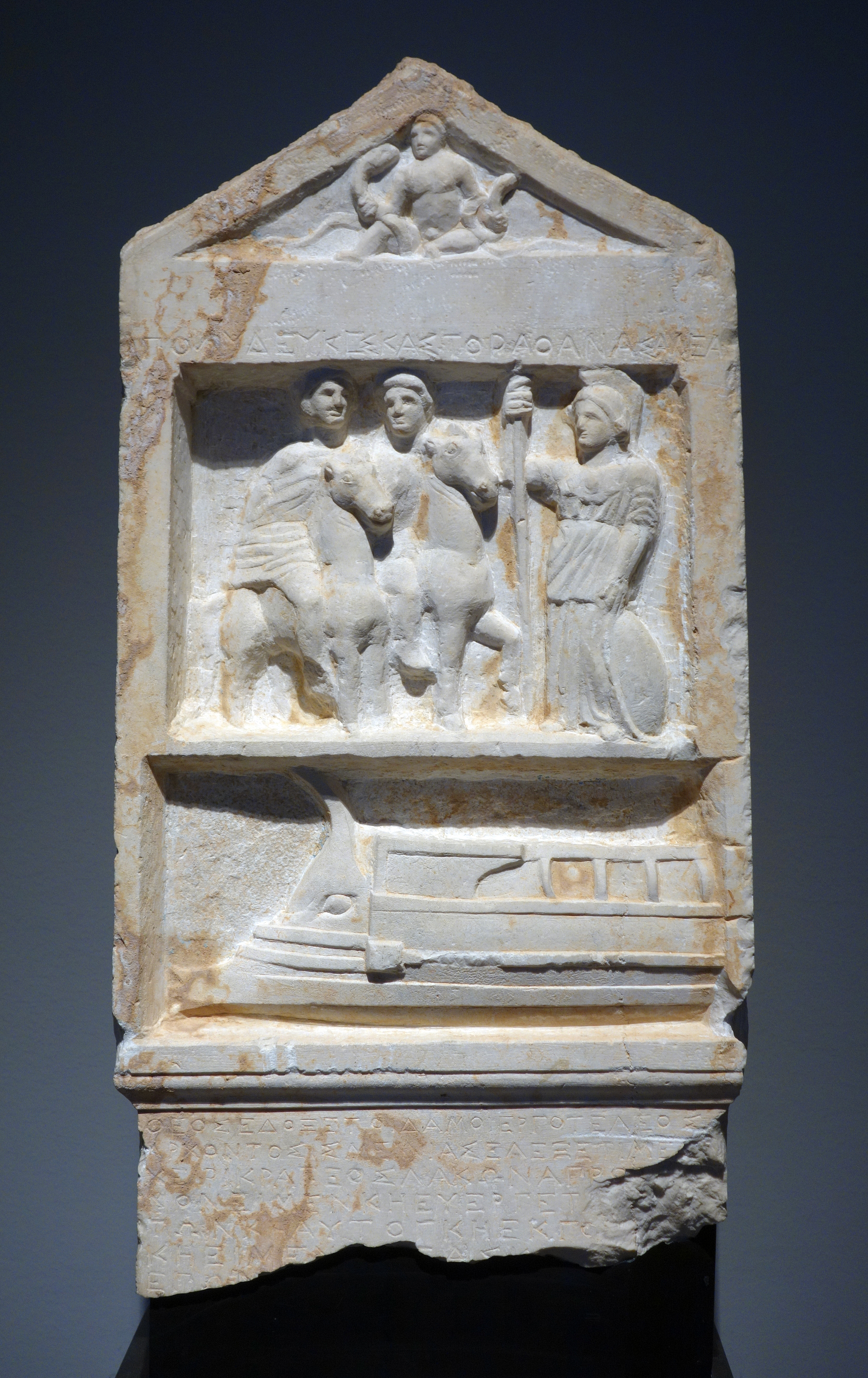
Boeotian proxeny stele depicting baby Herakles strangling snakes (top), and Athena Alea and the Dioskouroi above a warship (369–363 BCE)

== Mythology ==
Both Dioscuri were excellent horsemen and hunters who participated in the hunting of the Calydonian Boar and later joined the crew of Jason's ship, the Argo.

=== As Argonauts ===
During the expedition of the Argonauts, Pollux took part in a boxing contest and defeated King Amycus of the Bebryces, a savage mythical people in Bithynia. After returning from the voyage, the Dioscuri helped Jason and Peleus to destroy the city of Iolcus in revenge for the treachery of its king Pelias.

=== Rescuing Helen ===
When their sister Helen was abducted by Theseus, the half-brothers invaded his kingdom of Attica to rescue her. In revenge they abducted Theseus's mother Aethra and took her to Sparta while setting his rival, Menestheus, on the throne of Athens. Aethra was then forced to become Helen's slave. She was ultimately returned to her home by her grandsons Demophon and Acamas after the fall of Troy.

=== Leucippides, Lynceus, and death ===
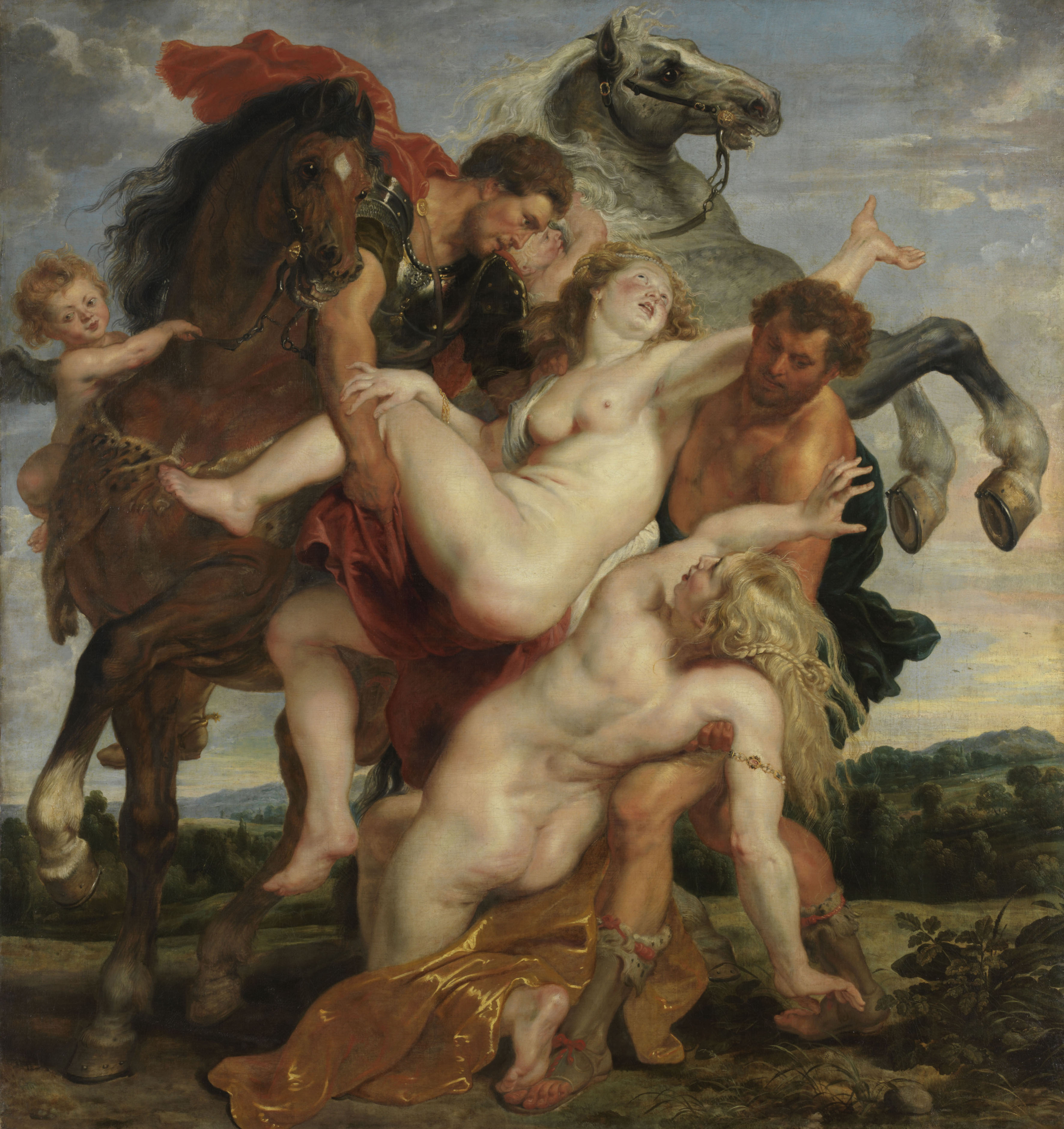
The Rape of the Daughters of Leucippus by Rubens, c. 1618

Castor and Pollux aspired to marry the Leucippides ("daughters of the white horse"), Phoebe and Hilaeira, whose father was Leucippus ("white horse"). (Note: Phoebe ("the pure") is a familiar epithet of the Moon, Selene; her twin's name Hilaeira ("the serene") is also a lunar attribute, their names "appropriate selectively to the new and the full moon".) Both women were already betrothed to cousins of the Dioscuri, the twin brothers Lynceus and Idas of Messenia, sons of Tyndareus's brother Aphareus. Castor and Pollux carried the women off to Sparta wherein each had a son; Phoebe bore Mnesileos to Pollux and Hilaeira bore Anogon to Castor. This began a family feud among the four sons of the brothers Tyndareus and Aphareus.

The cousins carried out a cattle-raid in Arcadia together but fell out over the division of the meat. After stealing the herd, but before dividing it, the cousins butchered, quartered, and roasted a calf. As they prepared to eat, the gigantic Idas suggested that the herd be divided into two parts instead of four, based on which pair of cousins finished their meal first. Castor and Pollux agreed. Idas quickly ate both his portion and Lynceus' portion. Castor and Pollux had been duped. They allowed their cousins to take the entire herd, but vowed someday to take revenge.

Some time later, Idas and Lynceus visited their uncle's home in Sparta. The uncle was on his way to Crete, so he left Helen in charge of entertaining the guests, which included both sets of cousins, as well as Paris, prince of Troy. Castor and Pollux recognized the opportunity to exact revenge, made an excuse that justified leaving the feast, and set out to steal their cousins' herd. Idas and Lynceus eventually set out for home, leaving Helen alone with Paris, who then kidnapped her. Thus, the four cousins helped set into motion the events that gave rise to the Trojan War.

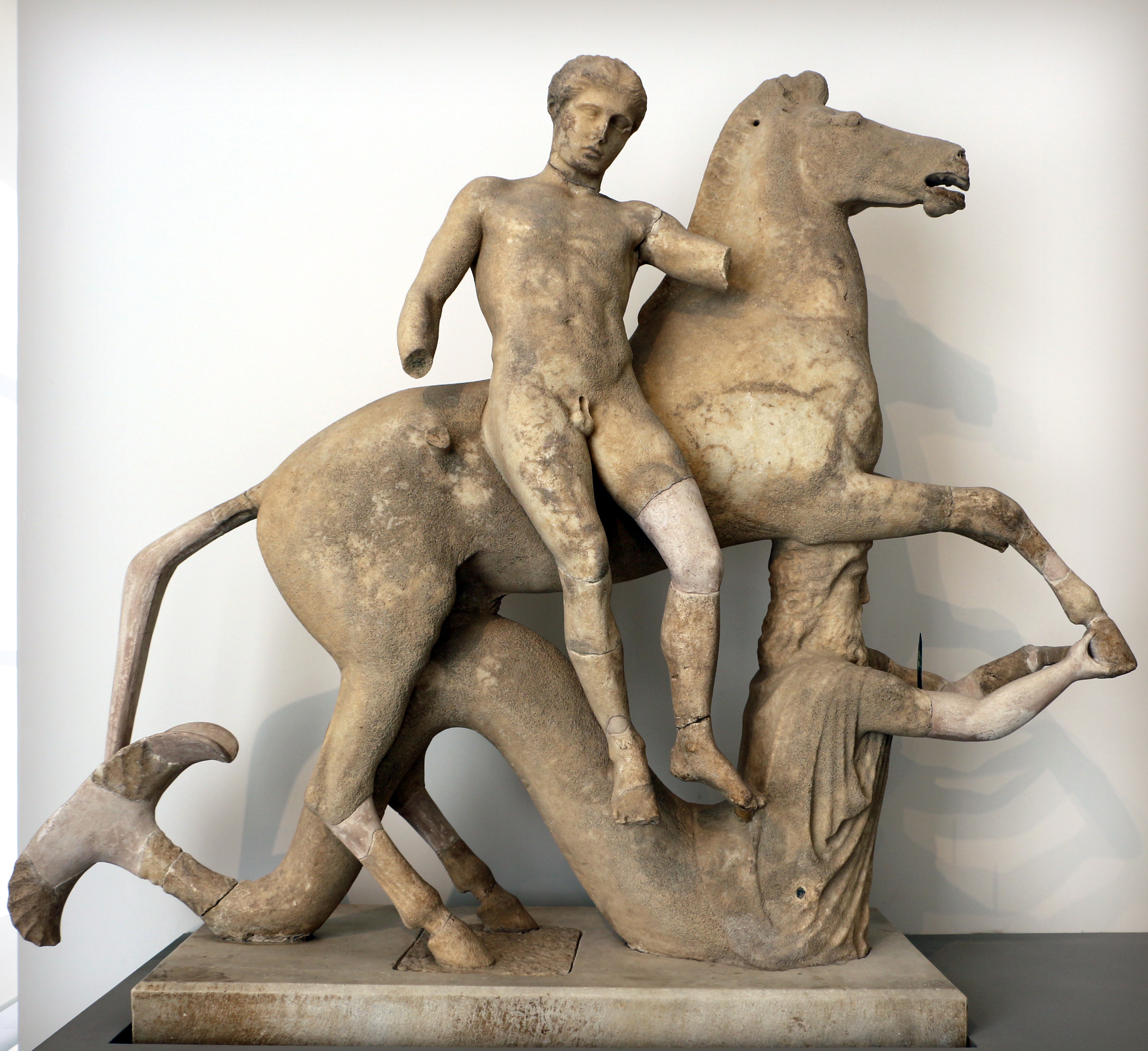
A twin supported by Triton, from a Locrian sculpture group (latter 5th century BCE)

Meanwhile, Castor and Pollux had reached their destination. Castor climbed a tree to keep a watch as Pollux began to free the cattle. Far away, Idas and Lynceus approached. Lynceus, named for the lynx because he could see in the dark, spied Castor hiding in the tree. Idas and Lynceus immediately understood what was happening. Idas, furious, ambushed Castor, fatally wounding him with a blow from his spear – but not before Castor called out to warn Pollux. In the ensuing brawl, Pollux killed Lynceus. As Idas was about to kill Pollux, Zeus, who had been watching from Mount Olympus, hurled a thunderbolt, killing Idas and saving his son.

Returning to the dying Castor, Pollux was given the choice by Zeus of spending all his time on Mount Olympus or giving half his immortality to his mortal brother. He opted for the latter, enabling the twins to alternate between Olympus and Hades. The brothers became the two brightest stars in the constellation Gemini ("the twins"): Castor (Alpha Geminorum) and Pollux (Beta Geminorum). As emblems of immortality and death, the Dioscuri, like Heracles, were said to have been initiated into the Eleusinian Mysteries. (Note: In the oration of the Athenian peace emissary sent to Sparta in 69, according to Xenophon (Hellenica VI), it was asserted that "these three heroes were the first strangers upon whom this gift was bestowed.") In some myths, Poseidon rewarded them with horses to ride and power to aid shipwrecked men.

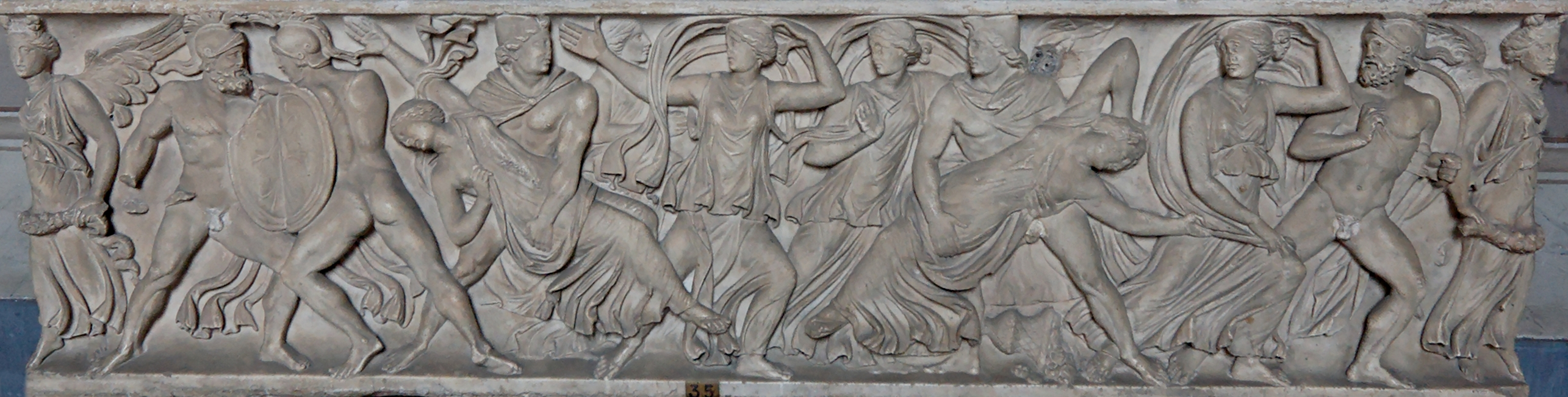
Roman sarcophagus (160 CE) depicting the rape of the Leucippides, Phoebe and Hilaeira (Vatican Museum)

== Iconography ==
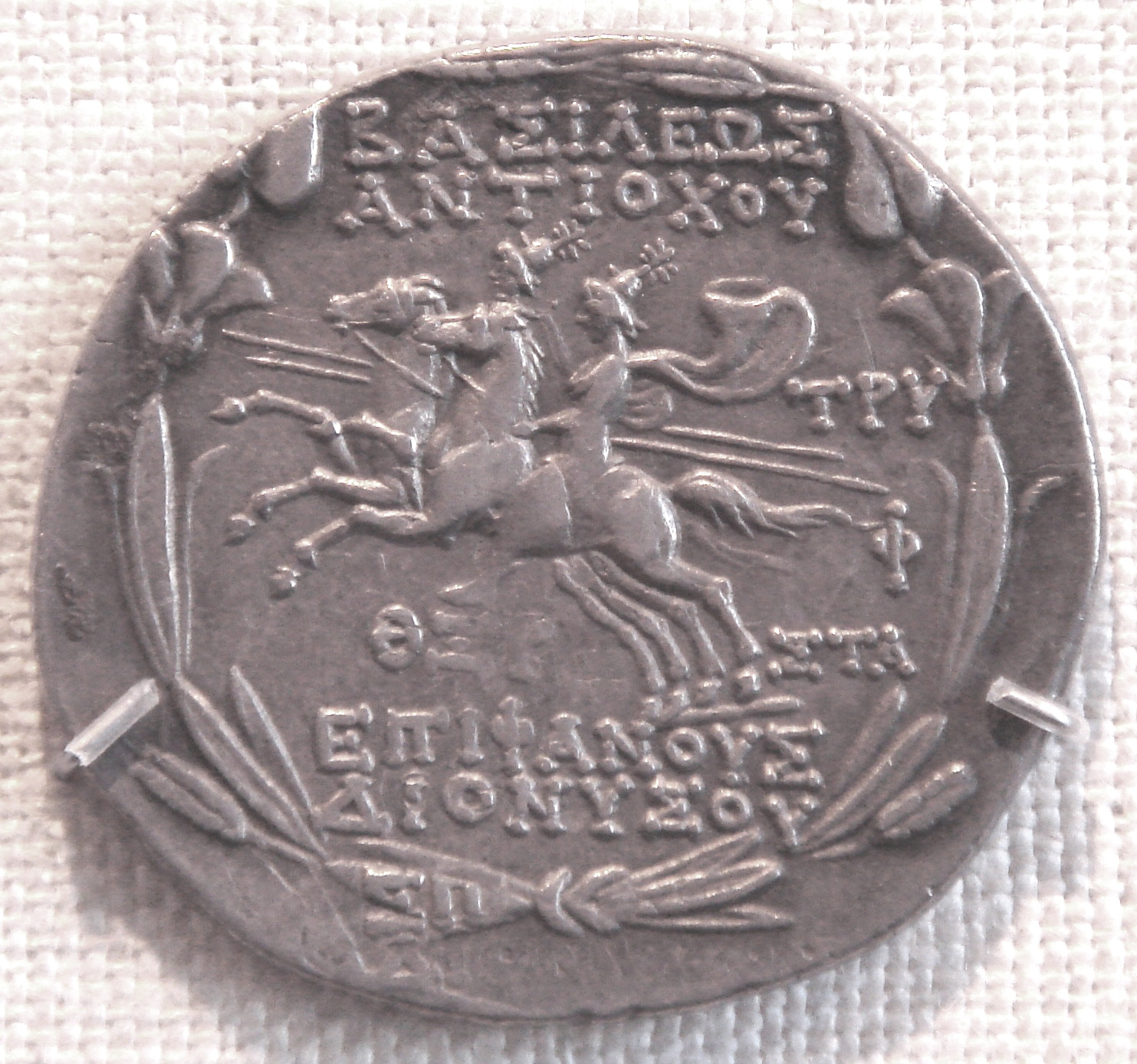
Coin of Antiochus VI with Dioskouroi

Castor and Pollux are consistently associated with horses in art and literature. They are widely depicted as helmeted horsemen carrying spears. The Pseudo-Oppian manuscript depicts the brothers hunting, both on horseback and on foot.

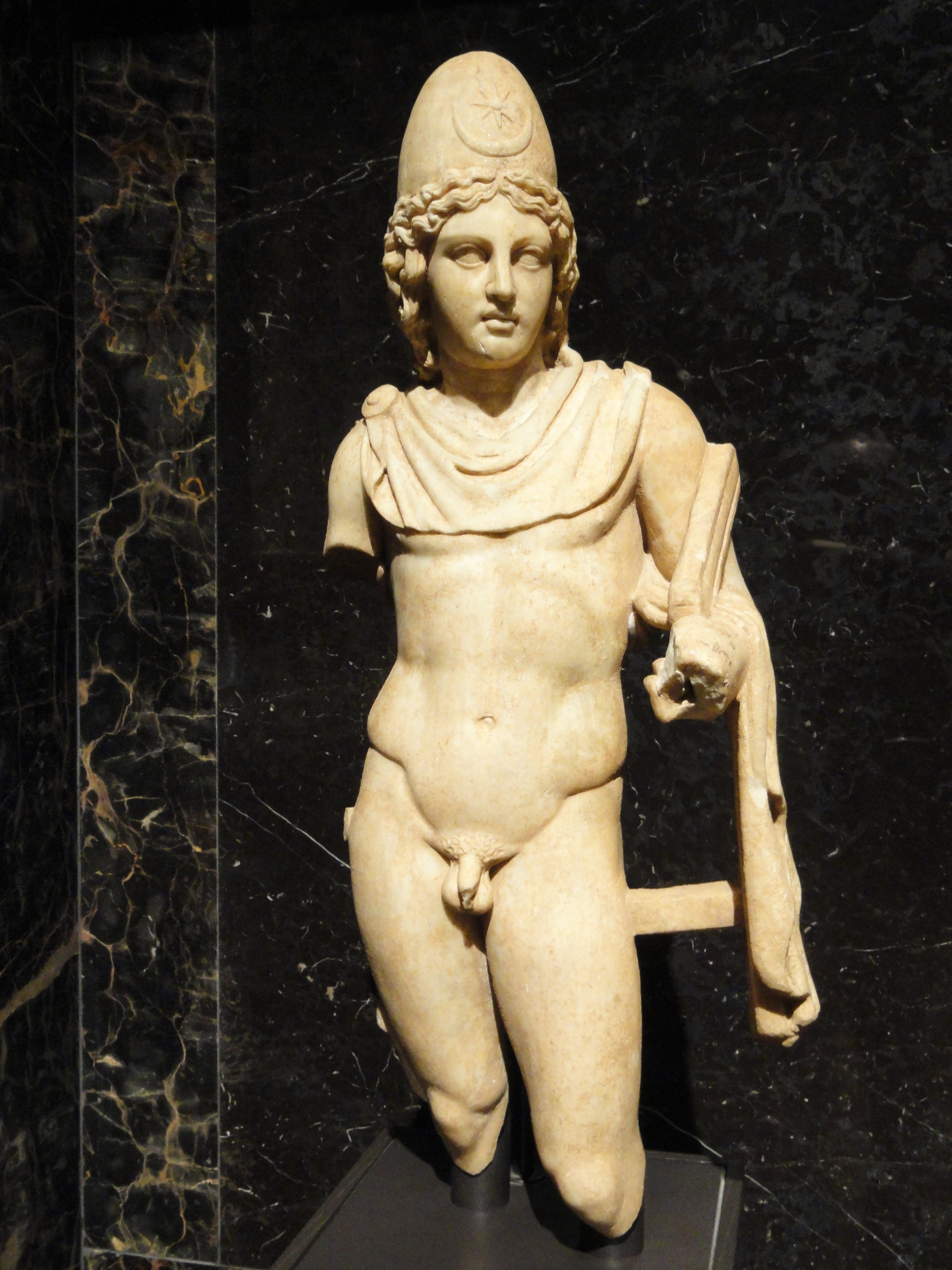
One of the twins wearing the egg-shaped cap, here marked with a celestial symbol (2nd century CE)

On votive reliefs they are depicted with a variety of symbols representing the concept of twinhood, such as the dokana (δόκανα – two upright pieces of wood connected by two cross-beams), a pair of amphorae, a pair of shields, or a pair of snakes. They are also often shown wearing felt caps, sometimes with stars above. They are depicted on metopes (an element of a Doric frieze) from Delphi showing them on the voyage of the Argo (Ἀργώ) and rustling cattle with Idas. Greek vases regularly show them capturing Phoebe and Hilaeira, as Argonauts, as well as in religious ceremonies and at the delivery to Leda of the egg containing Helen. They can be recognized in some vase-paintings by the skull-cap they wear, the pilos (πῖλος), which was already explained in antiquity as the remnants of the egg from which they hatched.

They were described by Dares Phrygius as "blond haired, large eyed, fair complexioned, and well-built with trim bodies".

=== Dokana ===
Dokana (ancient Greek δόκανα) were ancient symbolical representation of the Dioscuri that consisted of two upright beams with others laid across them transversely. The Dioscuri were worshipped as gods of war, and their images accompanied the Spartan kings whenever they took the field against an enemy. But when in the year 504 B.C. the two Spartan kings failed in their invasion of Attica on account of their secret enmity towards each other, it was decreed at Sparta, that in future only one king should command the army, and in consequence should only be accompanied by one of the images of the Dioscuri. It is not improbable that these images, accompanying the kings into the field, were the ancient dokana, which were now disjointed, so that one-half of the symbol remained at Sparta, while the other was taken into the field by one of the kings.

δόκανα seems to derive from δοκός ("dokos") which meant beam, but the Suda and the Etymologicum Magnum state that δόκανα was the name of the graves of the Dioscuri at Sparta, and derived from the verb δέχομαι ("dechomai").

== Shrines and rites ==
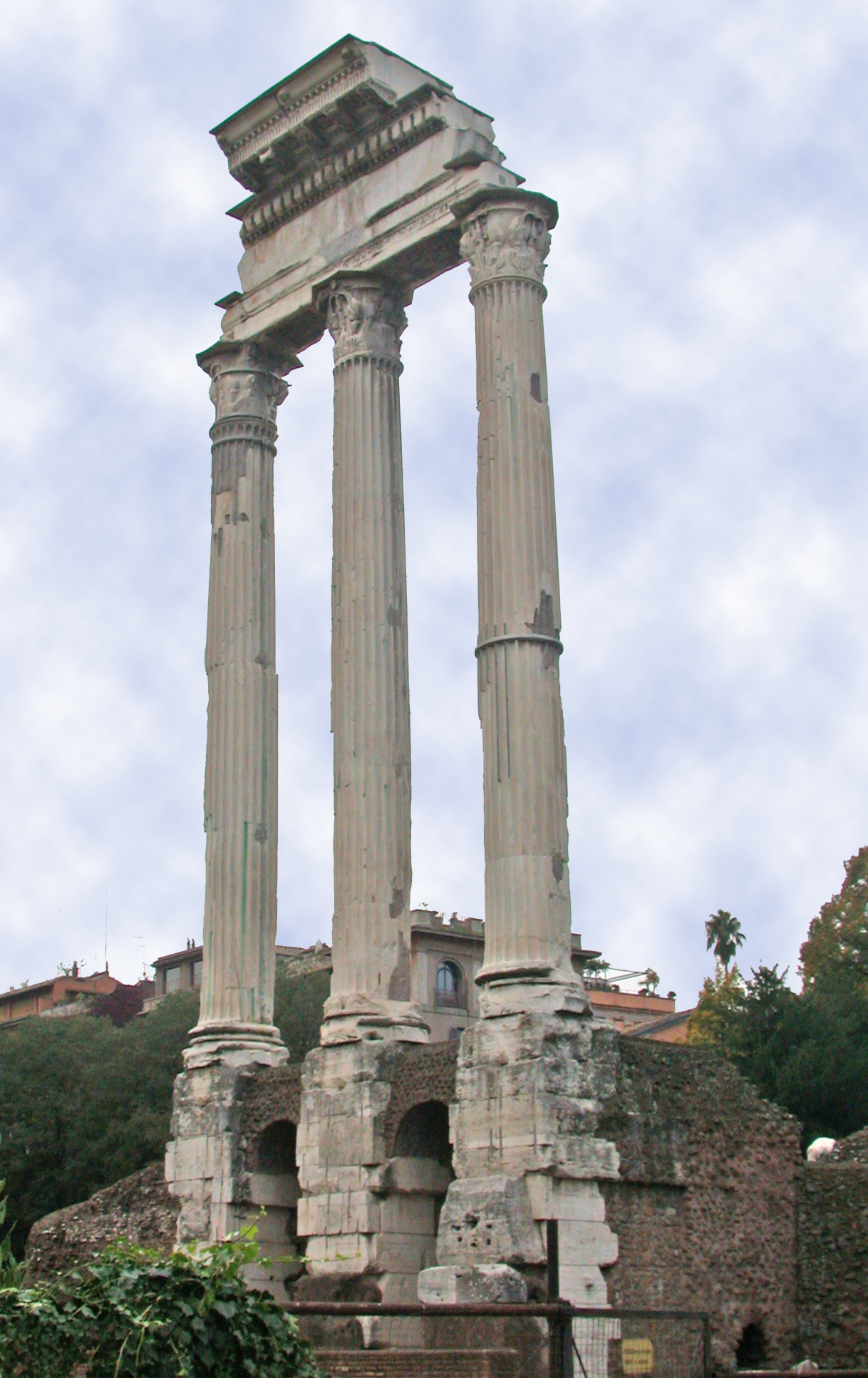
Fragmentary remains of the Temple of Castor and Pollux in Rome

The Dioskouroi were worshipped by the Greeks and Romans alike; there were temples to the twins in Athens, such as the Anakeion, and Rome, as well as shrines in many other locations in the ancient world.

The Dioskouroi and their sisters grew up in Sparta, in the royal household of Tyndareus; they were particularly important to the Spartans, who associated them with the Spartan tradition of dual kingship and appreciated that two princes of their ruling house were elevated to immortality. Their connection there was very ancient: a uniquely Spartan aniconic representation of the Tyndaridai was as two upright posts joined by a cross-bar; as the protectors of the Spartan army the "beam figure" or dókana was carried in front of the army on campaign. Sparta's unique dual kingship reflects the divine influence of the Dioscuri. When the Spartan army marched to war, one king remained behind at home, accompanied by one of the Twins. "In this way the real political order is secured in the realm of the Gods".

Their herōon or grave-shrine was on a mountain top at Therapne across the Eurotas from Sparta, at a shrine known as the Meneláeion where Helen, Menelaus, Castor and Pollux were all said to be buried. Castor himself was also venerated in the region of Kastoria in northern Greece.

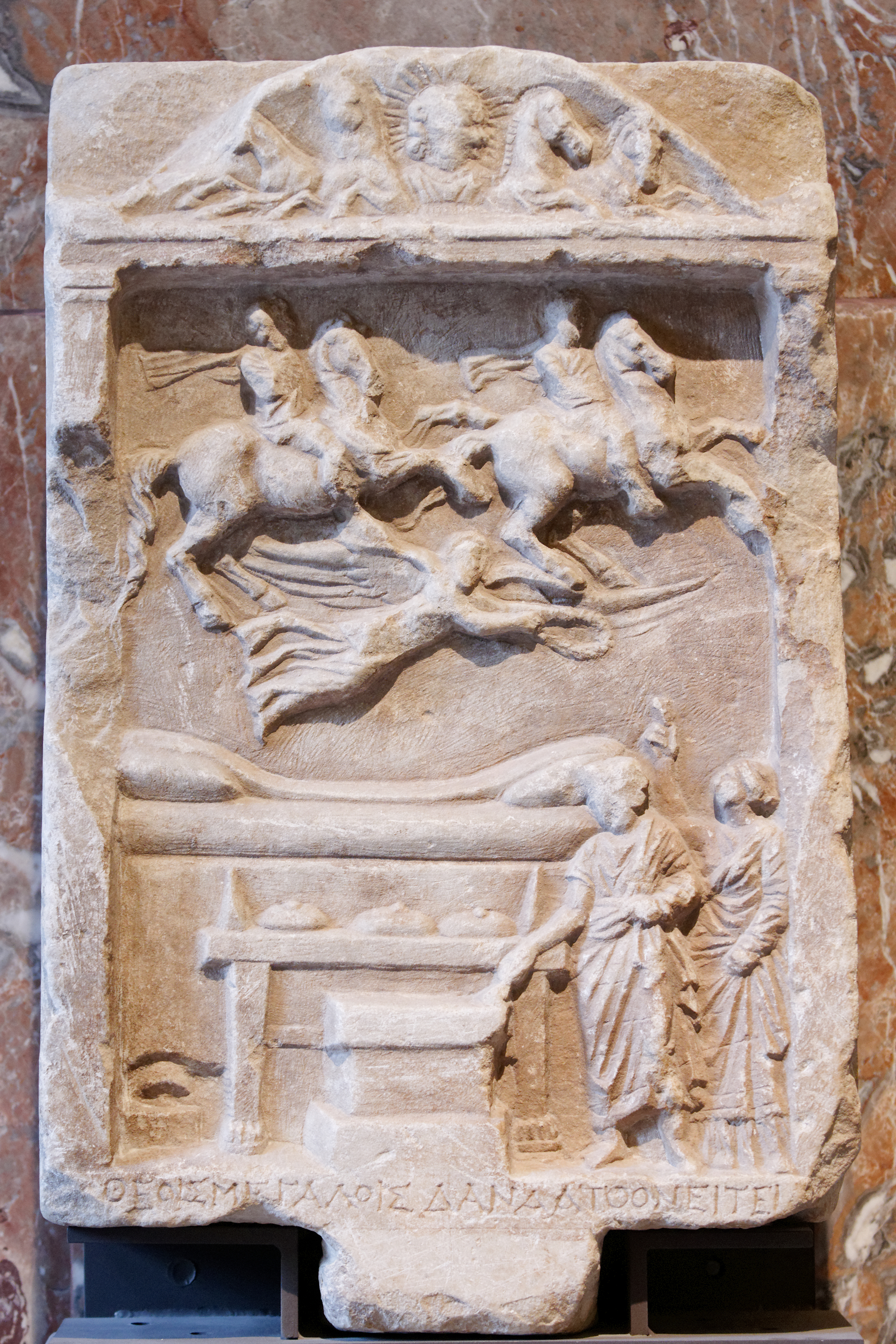
Relief (2nd century BCE) depicting the Dioskouroi galloping above a winged Victory, with a banquet (theoxenia) laid out for them below

They were commemorated both as gods on Olympus worthy of holocaust, and as deceased mortals in Hades, whose spirits had to be propitiated by libations. Lesser shrines to Castor, Pollux and Helen were also established at a number of other locations around Sparta. The pear tree was regarded by the Spartans as sacred to Castor and Pollux, and images of the twins were hung in its branches. The standard Spartan oath was to swear "by the two gods" (in Doric Greek: νά τώ θεὼ, ná tō theō, in the Dual number).

The rite of theoxenia (θεοξενία), "god-entertaining", was particularly associated with Castor and Pollux. The two deities were summoned to a table laid with food, whether at individuals' own homes or in the public hearths or equivalent places controlled by states. They are sometimes shown arriving at a gallop over a food-laden table. Although such "table offerings" were a fairly common feature of Greek cult rituals, they were normally made in the shrines of the gods or heroes concerned. The domestic setting of the theoxenia was a characteristic distinction accorded to the Dioskouroi.

The image of the twins attending a goddess are widespread (Note: Kerényi draws attention especially to the rock carvings in the town of Akrai, Sicily.) and link the Dioskouroi with the male societies of initiates under the aegis of the Anatolian Great Goddess and the great gods of Samothrace. During the Archaic period, the Dioscuri were venerated in Naukratis. The Dioscuri were said to be the inventors of war dances, which characterize the Kuretes.

Anakeia (ἀνάκεια) or Anakeion (ἀνάκειον) was a festival held at Athens in honor of the Dioscuri who also had the name Anakes (Ἄνακες).

Pausanias writes that the people of Amphissa celebrated mystery rites in honor of the so-called Anaktes Boys (Boy Kings). However, there was no agreement on their identity, some believed they were the Dioscuri, others thought they were the Curetes, and some identified them as the Cabeiri. He also writes that in Sparta there was an altar of the Dioscuri, with the epithet "Counsellors", situated next to the altars of Athena and Zeus, who likewise bore the epithet "Counsellor".

== Argos ==
Plutarch writes that the Argives called Castor the "Associate-founder" (mixarchagetas; "μιξαρχαγέτας") and believed that he was buried in Argive territory. Polydeuces, however, was revered as one of the Olympian gods.

== City of Dioscurias ==
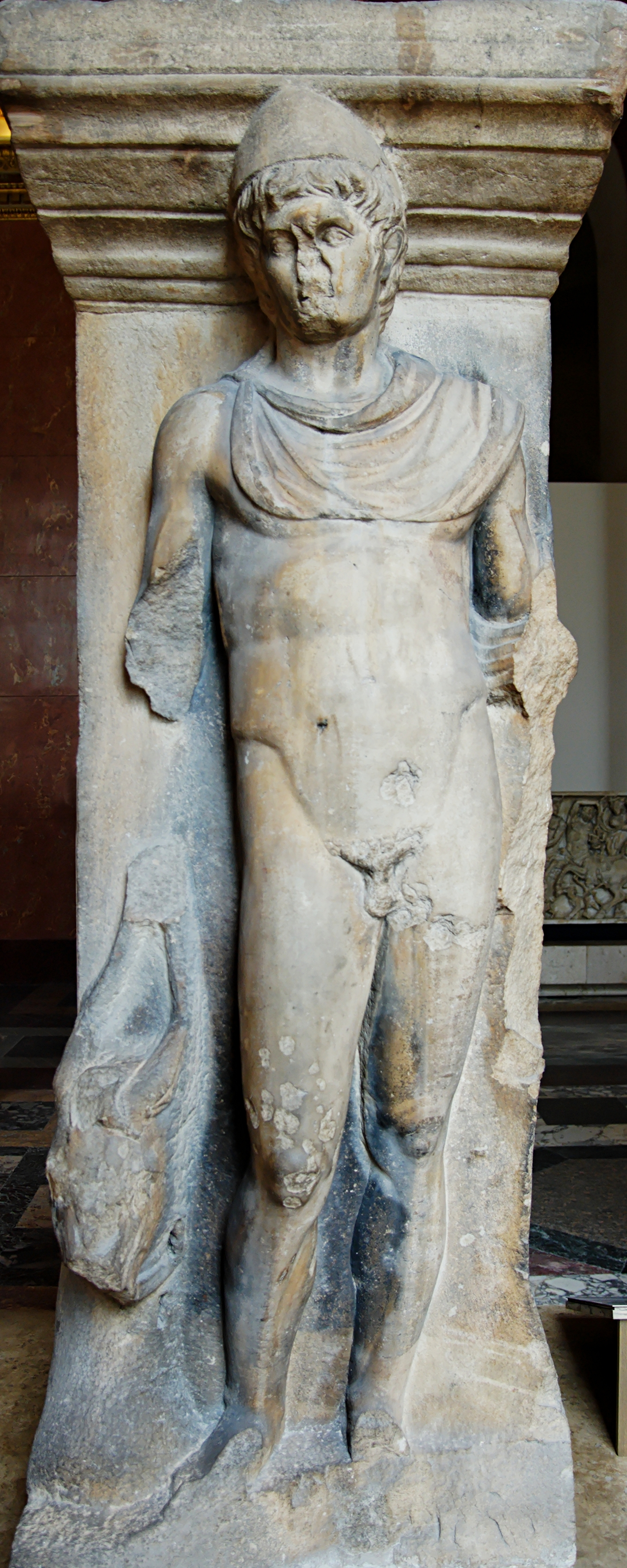
One of the Dioscuri, on a Las Incantadas pillar (2nd century CE)

The ancient city of Dioscurias or Dioskurias (Διοσκουριάς) on the Black Sea coast, modern Sokhumi, was named after them. In addition, according to legend the city was founded by them. According to another legend, the city was founded by their charioteers, Amphitus and Cercius of Sparta.

== Dioscuron kome ==
Dioscuron kome or Dioskuron kome (Διοσκούρων κώμη) was a settlement in Libya whose name meant "Village of the Dioscuri"; its location is unknown today. According to the myth, the Dioscuri pursued Paris, recovered Helen from him and then settled there. An inhabitant of the village was called Dioskourokometes (Διοσκουροκωμήτης).

== Island of Dioscuri ==
The island of Socotra, located between the Guardafui Channel and the Arabian Sea, was called by the Greeks Dioskouridou (Διοσκουρίδου νῆσος), meaning "the island of the Dioscuri".

== Ahenobarbus/Aenobarbus ==
The name Ahenobarbus/Aenobarbus (Ἀηνόβαρβος) comes from a plebeian family of the Domitia gens, known for their distinctive red hair which many of this family had. The origin of the name, meaning "Brazen-bearded," is explained through a myth that ties the family to the Dioscuri. According to the legend, one of the family's ancestors was informed by the Dioscuri of the Roman victory over the Latin League at the Battle of Lake Regillus. To prove the truth of their message, the Dioscuri allegedly stroked his black hair and beard, which then turned red.

== Indo-European analogues ==
The heavenly twins appear in Indo-European tradition as the effulgent Vedic brother-horsemen called the Ashvins, Lithuanian Ašvieniai, and possibly Germanic Alcis.

== Etruscan Kastur and Pultuce ==
The Etruscans venerated the twins as Kastur and Pultuce, collectively as the tinas cliniiaras, "Sons of Tinia", Etruscan counterpart of Zeus. They were often portrayed on Etruscan mirrors. As was the fashion in Greece, they could also be portrayed symbolically; one example is seen in the Tomb of the Funereal Bed at Tarquinia where a lectisternium is painted for them. Another is symbolised in a painting depicted as two pointed caps crowned with laurel, referring to the Phrygian caps.

== Italy and the Roman Empire ==
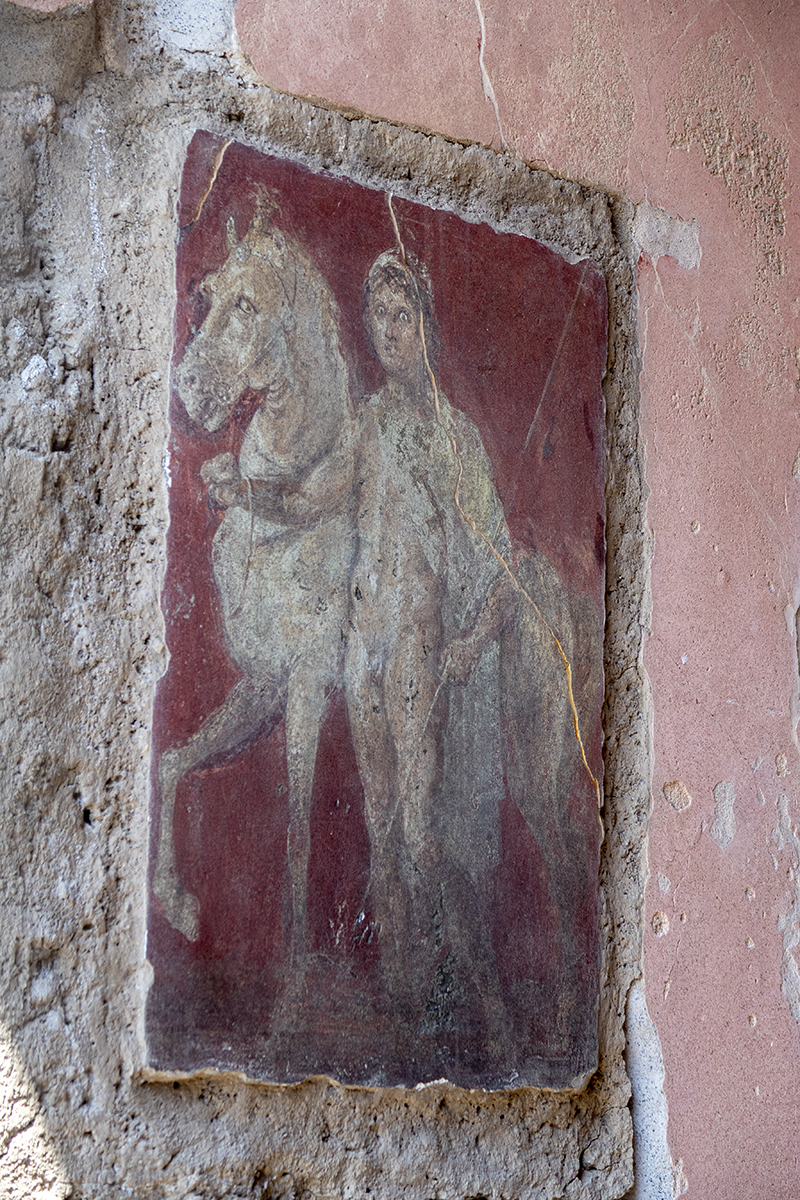
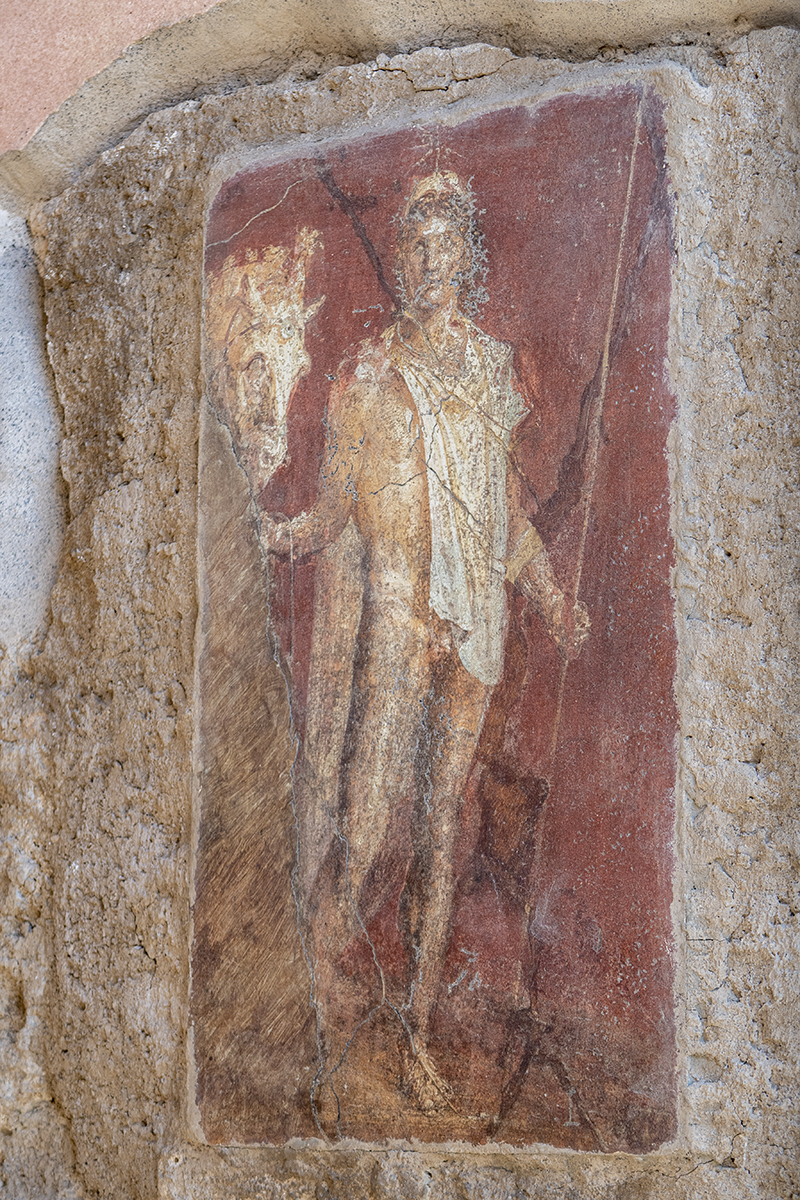
The House of the Dioscuri, Pompeii, was named for the paintings flanking the entrance

From the 5th century BCE onwards, the brothers were revered by the Romans, probably as the result of cultural transmission via the Greek colonies of Magna Graecia in southern Italy. An archaic Latin inscription of the 6th or 5th century BCE found at Lavinium, which reads Castorei Podlouqueique qurois ("To Castor and Pollux, the Dioskouroi"), suggests a direct transmission from the Greeks; the word "qurois" is virtually a transliteration of the Greek word κούροις.

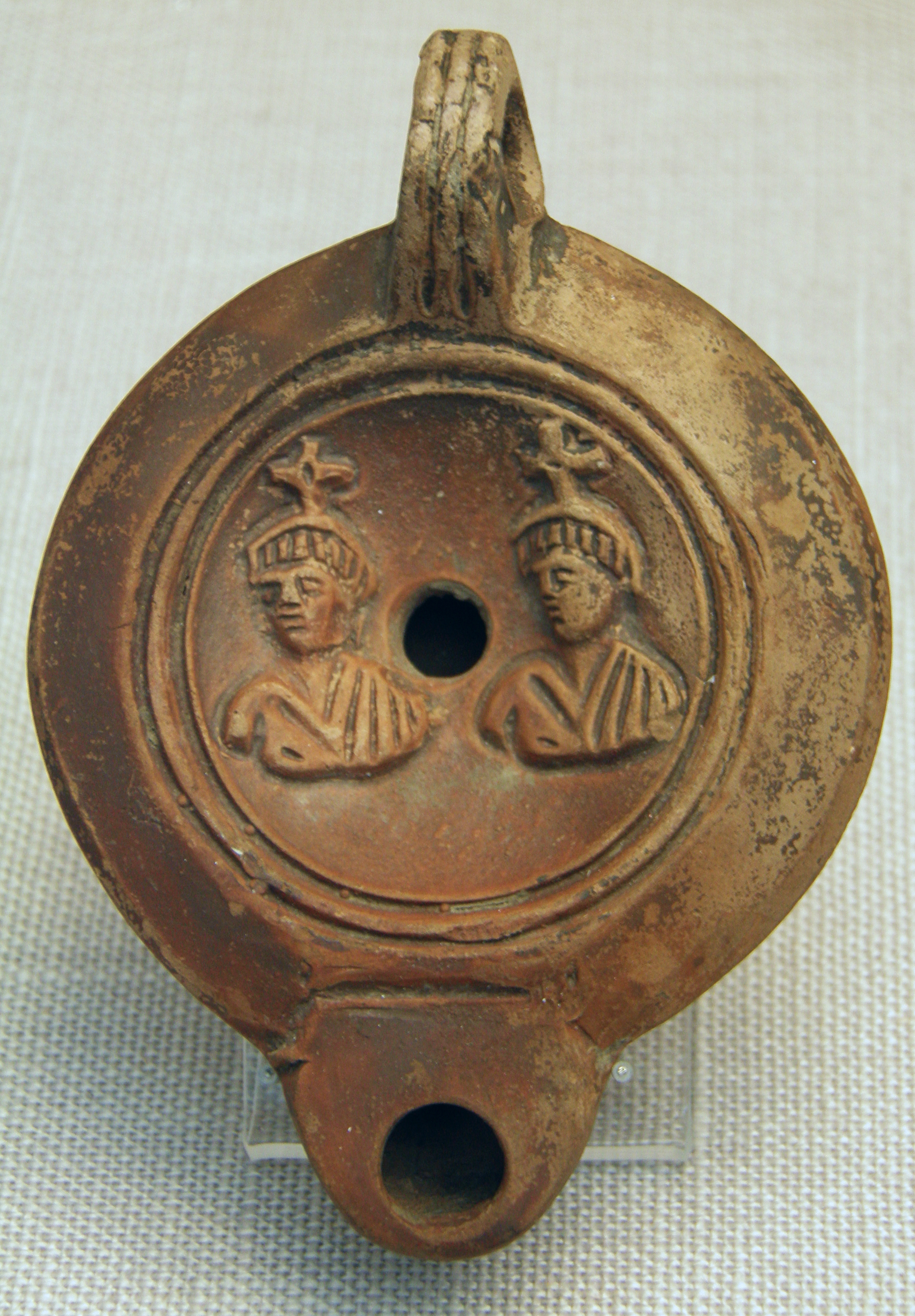
Star crosses indicate the constellation Gemini on this Roman oil lamp (1st century CE)

The construction of the Temple of Castor and Pollux, located in the Roman Forum at the heart of their city, was undertaken to fulfill a vow (votum) made by Aulus Postumius Albus Regillensis in gratitude at the Roman victory in the Battle of Lake Regillus in 495 BCE. The establishment of a temple may also be a form of evocatio, the transferral of a tutelary deity from a defeated town to Rome, where cult would be offered in exchange for favor. According to legend, the twins fought at the head of the Roman army and subsequently brought news of the victory back to Rome. The Locrians of Magna Graecia had attributed their success at a legendary battle on the banks of the Sagras to the intervention of the Twins. The Roman legend could have had its origins in the Locrian account and possibly supplies further evidence of cultural transmission between Rome and Magna Graecia.

The Romans believed that the twins aided them on the battlefield. Their role as horsemen made them particularly attractive to the Roman equites and cavalry. Each year on July 15, Feast Day of the Dioskouroi, 1,800 equestrians would parade through the streets of Rome in an elaborate spectacle in which each rider wore full military attire and whatever decorations he had earned.

Castor and Pollux are also represented in the Circus Maximus by the use of eggs as lap counters.

In Plautus and Terence, only women swear by Castor (La. mēcastor), whereas men swear by Hercules (mehercule); both swear by Pollux (La. pol).

Photius wrote that Polydeuces was a lover of Hermes, and the god made him a gift of Dotor (Ancient Greek: Δώτορ), the Thessalian horse.

=== Christianization ===
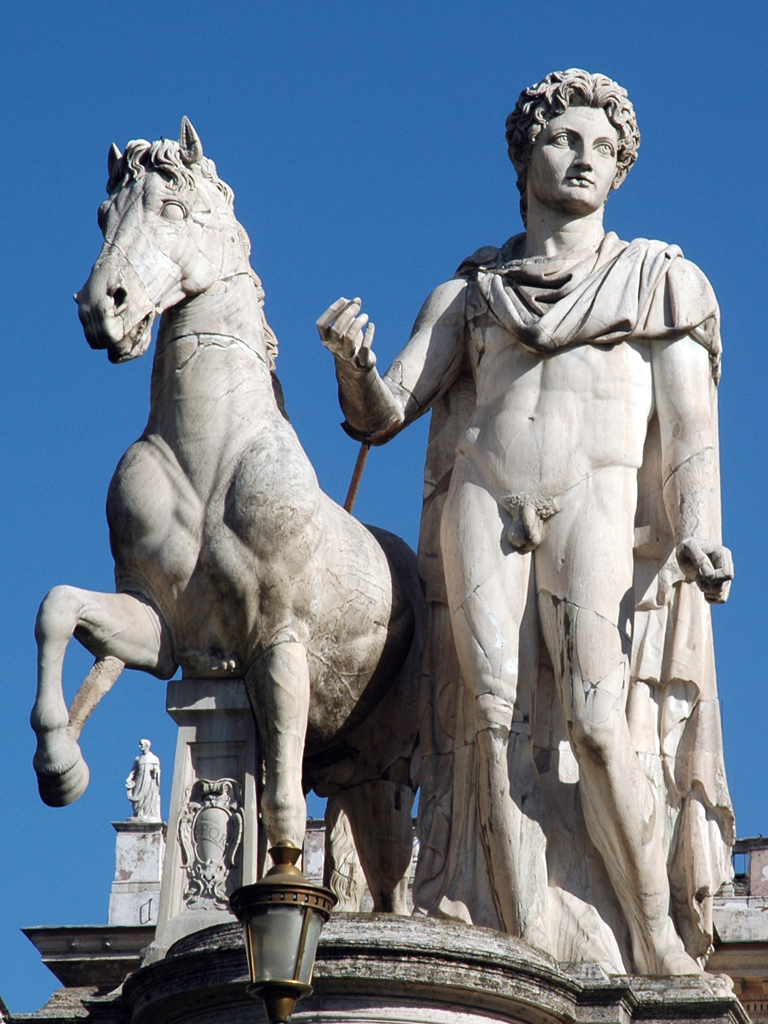
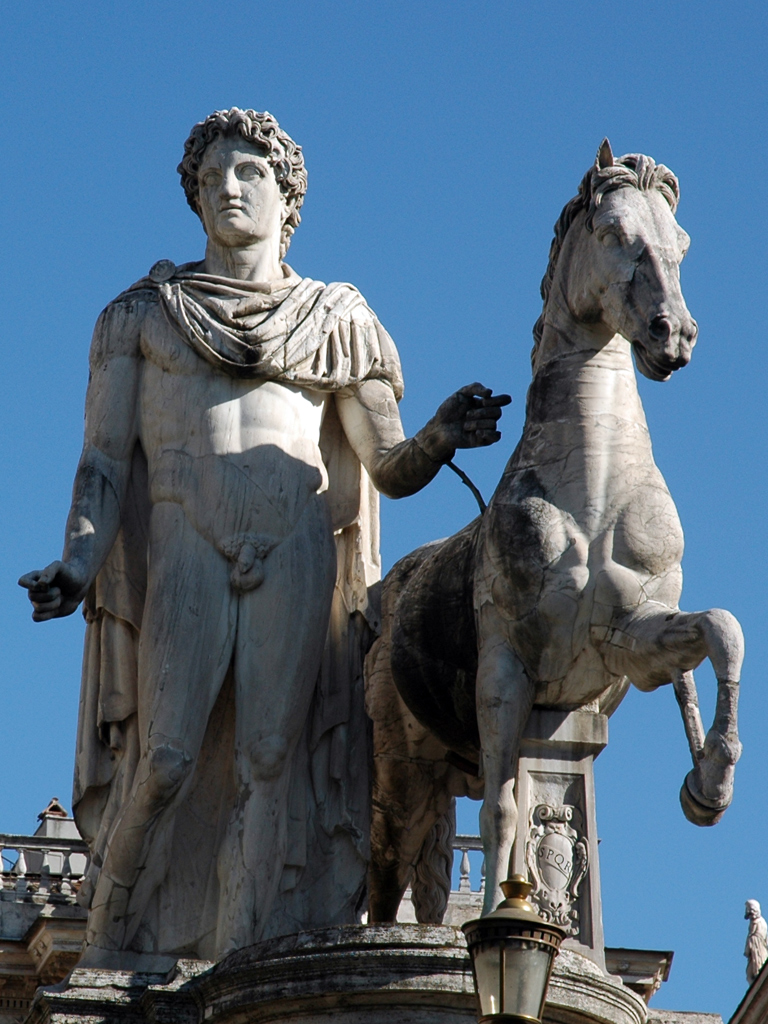
Late Roman Imperial Dioscuri, transferred from a temple of Castor and Pollux to the Piazza del Campidoglio on the Capitoline in 1585

Even after the rise of Christianity, the Dioskouroi continued to be venerated. The 5th century pope Gelasius I attested to the presence of a "cult of Castores" that the people did not want to abandon. In some instances, the twins appear to have simply been absorbed into a Christian framework; thus 4th century CE pottery and carvings from North Africa depict the Dioskouroi alongside the Twelve Apostles, the Raising of Lazarus or with Saint Peter. The church took an ambivalent attitude, rejecting the immortality of the Dioskouroi but seeking to replace them with equivalent Christian pairs. Saints Peter and Paul were thus adopted in place of the Dioskouroi as patrons of travelers, and Saints Cosmas and Damian took over their function as healers. Some have also associated Saints Speusippus, Eleusippus, and Melapsippus with the Dioskouroi.

The New Testament scholar Dennis MacDonald identifies Castor and Pollux as models for James son of Zebedee and his brother John in the Gospel of Mark. MacDonald cites the origin of this identification to 1913 when J. Rendel Harris published his work Boanerges, a Greek version probably of an Aramaic name meaning "Sons of Thunder", thunder being associated with Zeus, father of Pollux, in what MacDonald calls a form of early Christian Dioscurism.

More directly, the Acts of the Apostles mentions the Dioskouroi in a neutral context, as the figurehead of an Alexandrian ship boarded by Paul in Malta (Acts 28:11).

== Gallery ==
The iconography of Castor and Pollux influenced or has close parallels with depictions of divine male twins in cultures with Greco-Roman relations.

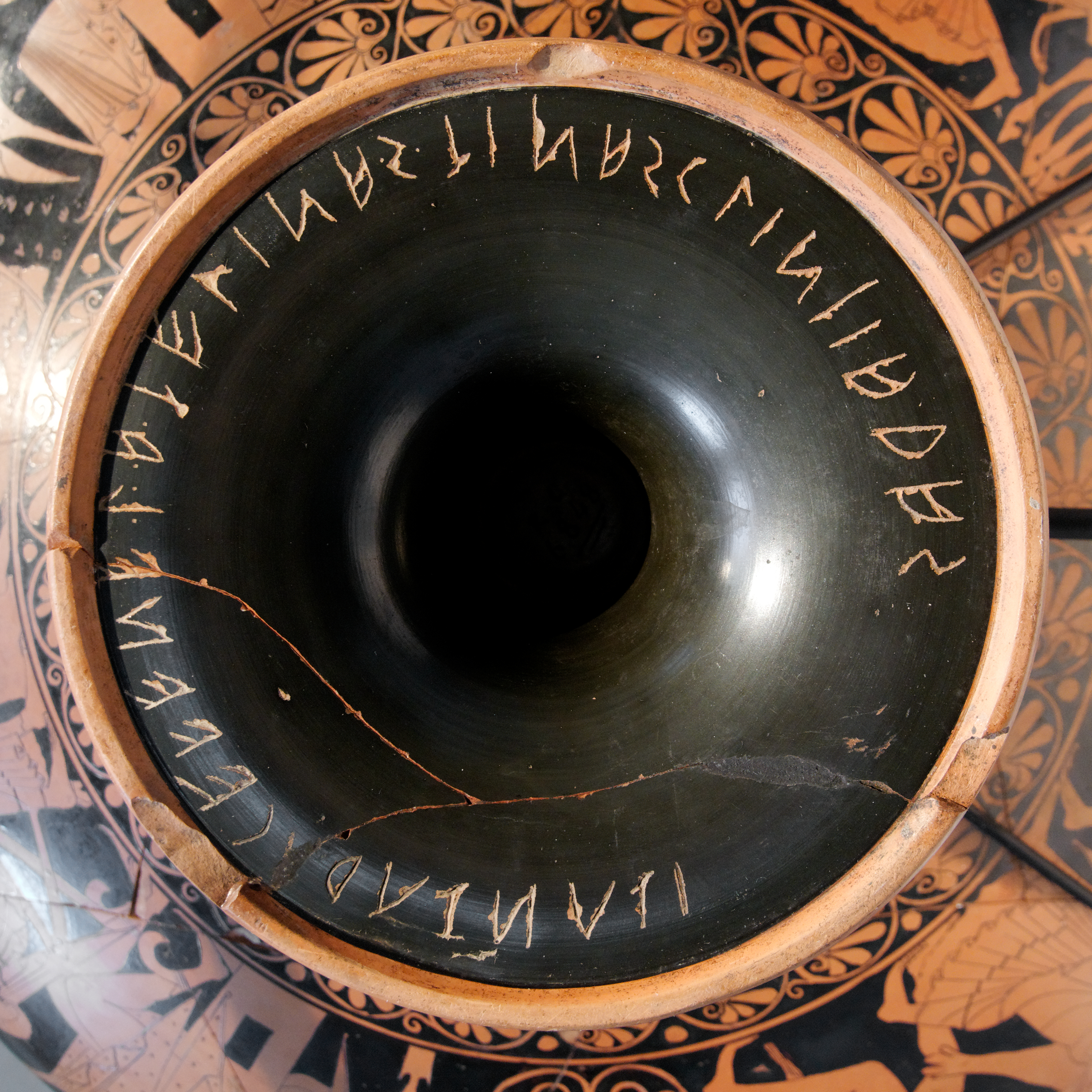
Etruscan inscription to the Dioskouroi as "sons of Zeus" at the bottom of an Attic red-figure kylix (c. 515–510 BCE)

Limestone stele from Roman Egypt with a star connected to each twin's head (30 BCE – 395 CE)

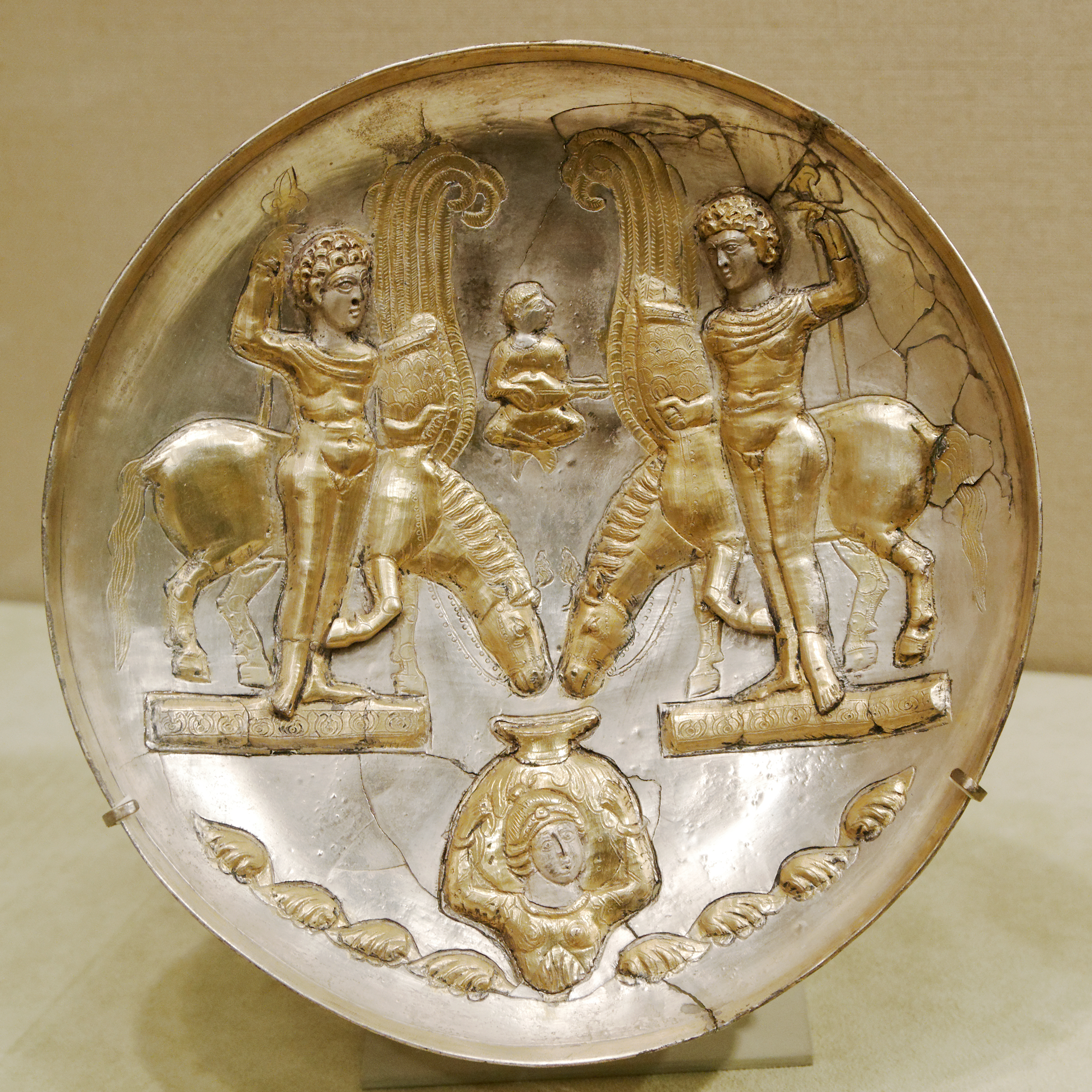
Sassanian silver platter with warrior twins on winged horses (5th/6th century CE)

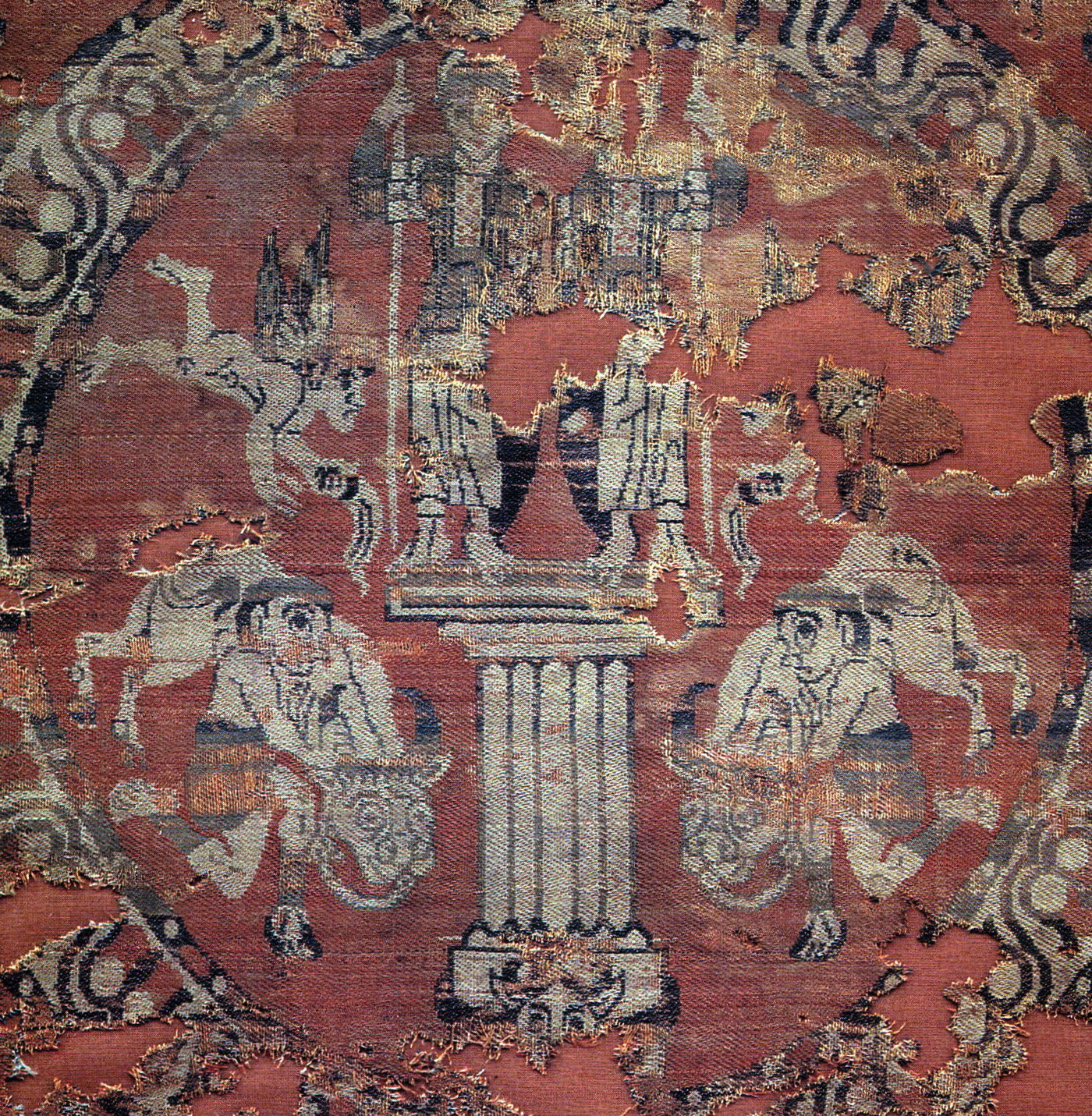
Byzantine silk textile with elevated twins receiving offerings (7th/8th century CE)

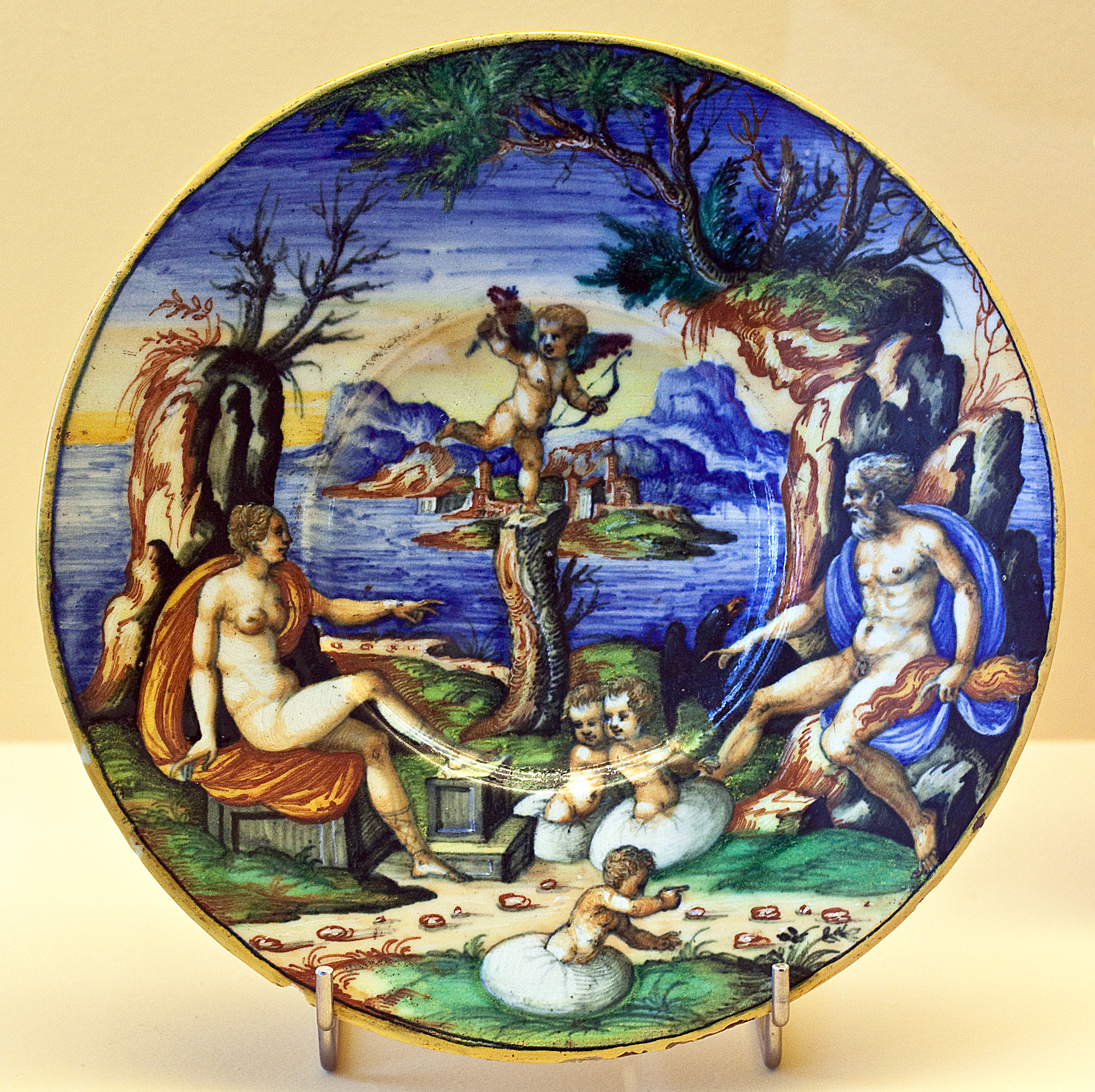
Zeus, Hera, and Amor observe the birth of Helen and Dioscuri (Dutch majolica, 1550)

== See also ==
- Alexiares and Anicetus, twin-sons of Heracles/Hercules and Hebe/Juventas; alongside their father, they are the guardians of the gates of Mount Olympus.
- Ambulia, a Spartan epithet used for Athena, Zeus, and Castor and Pollux
- Ašvieniai, the divine twins in Lithuanian mythology
- Ashvins, the divine twins of Hindu mythology
- Castorian (dog), extinct dog breed said to have been bred by Castor
- Divine twins, a common motif in Proto-Indo-European mythology
- Gozu and Mezu, two guardians of the underworld in Japanese mythology
- Heteropaternal superfecundation, when two males father fraternal twins
- Janus, god of duality in Ancient Roman religion
- Lugal-irra and Meslamta-ea, twins gods in Mesopotamian mythology also thought to be represented by the constellation Gemini
- Nio, a pair of guardians found at the entrance of many Buddhist temples
- Thracian horseman, sometimes linked to the Dioscuri
- Twins in mythology, found in different cultures across the world

== Sources ==
- Burkert, Walter (1985), Greek Religion, Cambridge: Harvard University Press, pp. 212–13.
- Kerényi, Karl (1959), The Heroes of the Greeks, Thames and Hundson, pp. 105–12 et passim.
- Maier, Bernhard (1997), Dictionary of Celtic Religion and Culture, Boydell & Brewer.
- Pindar, Tenth Nemean Ode.
- Ringleben, Joachim, "An Interpretation of the 10th Nemean Ode", Ars Disputandi, translated by Douglas Hedley and Russell Manning. Pindar's themes of the unequal brothers and faithfulness and salvation, with the Christian parallels in the dual nature of Christ.
- "Dioskouroi", Ouranios, Theoi Project. Excerpts in English of classical sources.
- Walker, Henry J. The Twin Horse Gods: The Dioskouroi in Mythologies of the Ancient World. London, New York: I. B. Tauris, 2015.
