= Aristophon of Azenia =

4th-century BC Athenian politician

Aristophon of Azenia (Ancient Greek: Ἀριστοφῶν ὁ Ἀζηνιεύς, romanized: Aristophôn ho Azēnieús; fl. c. 4th century BC) was an orator native to the deme of Azenia in Attica. He lived during the Peloponnesian War. In 412 BC, Aristophon, Laespodias, and Melesias were sent to Sparta as ambassadors by the oligarchical government of the Four Hundred.

In the archonship of Euclid in 403/402, after Athens was delivered from the Thirty Tyrants, Aristophon proposed a law that ordained that no one should be regarded as a citizen of Athens whose mother was not a freeborn woman, which, though said to be beneficial to the democracy, caused some distress for many families in Athens. He also proposed various other laws, by which he acquired great popularity and the full confidence of the people. Their great number may be inferred from his own statement that he was accused 75 times of having made illegal proposals, but that he had always come off victorious. In 354, he charged two consequential Athenian generals, Iphicrates and Timotheus, with having accepted bribes from the Chians and Rhodians. While Timotheus was somewhat unpopular and was fined heavily, that Aristophon could accuse Iphicrates, who was acquitted, without repercussions shows the extent of his prestige.

After this event, but still in 354, he came forward in the assembly to defend the law of Leptines against Demosthenes. The latter, who often mentions him, treats the aged Aristophon with great respect, and reckons him among the most eloquent orators. This event is the last record of Aristophon, and he seems to have died soon after. No record of his orations has come down to us.
