= Aristotle =

Ancient Greek philosopher and polymath (384–322 BC)

- Ἀριστοτέλης
- Roman copy of a Greek bust of Aristotle
- Born: 384 BC; Stagira, then part of the Chalcidian League
- Died: 322 BC (aged 61–62); Chalcis, then part of the Macedonian Empire

Education
- Education: Platonic Academy

Philosophical work
- Era: Ancient Greek philosophy
- Region: Western philosophy
- School: Peripatetic school
- Notable students: Alexander the Great, Theophrastus, Aristoxenus
- Main interests: Logic; Natural philosophy; Metaphysics; Ethics; Politics; Rhetoric; Poetics
- Notable works: Organon; Physics; Metaphysics; Nicomachean Ethics; Politics; Rhetoric; Poetics
- Notable ideas: Aristotelianism Theoretical philosophy: Aristotelian logic, syllogism; Four causes; Genus and differentia; Hylomorphism, substance, essence, accident; Hypokeimenon; Potentiality and actuality; Theory of universals; Unmoved mover; Natural philosophy: Aristotelian biology; Aristotelian physics; Common sense; Eternity of the world; Five wits; Horror vacui; Theory of elements, aether; Rational animal; Practical philosophy: Aristotelian ethics; Catharsis; Deliberative, epideictic and forensic rhetoric; Enthymeme and Paradeigma; Family as a model for the state; Golden mean; Kyklos; Magnanimity; Mimesis; Natural slavery; Intellectual virtues: sophia, episteme, nous, phronesis, techne; Three appeals: ethos, logos, pathos; Views on women

Aristotle (Note: /ˈærɪstɒtəl/ ARR-ih-stot-əl) (Ancient Greek: Ἀριστοτέλης, romanized: Aristotélēs; (Note: pronounced [aristotélɛːs]) 384–322 BC) was an ancient Greek philosopher and polymath. His writings span the natural sciences, philosophy, linguistics, economics, politics, psychology, and the arts. As the founder of the Peripatetic school of philosophy in the Lyceum in Athens, he began the wider Aristotelian tradition that followed, which set the groundwork for the development of modern science.

Little is known about Aristotle's life. He was born in the city of Stagira in Chalkidiki (northern Greece) during the Classical period. His father, Nicomachus, died when Aristotle was a child, and he was brought up by a guardian. At around eighteen years old, he joined Plato's Academy in Athens and remained there until the age of thirty seven (c. 347 BC). Shortly after Plato died, Aristotle left Athens and, at the request of Philip II of Macedon, tutored his son Alexander the Great beginning in 343 BC. He established a library in the Lyceum, which helped him to produce many of his hundreds of books on papyrus scrolls.

Though Aristotle wrote many treatises and dialogues for publication, only around a third of his original output has survived, none of it intended for publication. Aristotle provided a complex synthesis of the various philosophies existing prior to him. His teachings and methods of inquiry have had a significant impact across the world, and remain a subject of contemporary philosophical discussion.

Aristotle's views profoundly shaped medieval scholarship. The influence of his physical science extended from late antiquity and the Early Middle Ages into the Renaissance, and was not replaced systematically until the Enlightenment and theories such as classical mechanics were developed. He influenced Judeo-Islamic philosophies during the Middle Ages, as well as Christian theology, especially the Neoplatonism of the Early Church and the scholastic tradition of the Catholic Church. Aristotle was revered among medieval Muslim scholars as "The First Teacher", and among medieval Christians like Thomas Aquinas as simply "The Philosopher". He has been described as the first scientist. His works contain the earliest known systematic study of logic, and were studied by medieval scholars such as Peter Abelard and Jean Buridan. His influence on logic continued well into the 19th century. In addition, his ethics, although always influential, has gained renewed interest with the modern advent of virtue ethics.

== Life ==
In general, the details of Aristotle's life are not well-established. The biographies written in ancient times are often speculative and historians only agree on a few salient points. (Note: See Shields 2012, pp. 3–16. Blits 1999, p. 58 writes that most information about Aristotle's life derives from Diogenes Laertius' Lives and Opinions of Eminent Philosophers, which in turn borrows material from earlier, now mostly lost, sources. Düring 1957 covers ancient biographies of Aristotle.) Aristotle was born in 384 BC (Note: That these dates (the first half of the Olympiad year 384/383 BC, and in 322 shortly before the death of Demosthenes) are correct was shown by August Boeckh (Kleine Schriften VI 195); for further discussion, see Felix Jacoby on FGrHist 244 F 38. Ingemar Düring, Aristotle in the Ancient Biographical Tradition, Göteborg, 1957, p. 253) in Stagira, Chalcidice, about 55 km (34 miles) east of modern-day Thessaloniki. He was the son of Nicomachus, the personal physician of King Amyntas of Macedon, and Phaestis, a woman with origins from Chalcis, Euboea. Nicomachus was said to have belonged to the medical guild of Asclepiadae and was likely responsible for Aristotle's early interest in biology and medicine. Ancient tradition held that Aristotle's family descended from the legendary physician Asclepius and his son Machaon. Both of Aristotle's parents died when he was still at a young age and Proxenus of Atarneus became his guardian. Although little information about Aristotle's childhood has survived, he probably spent some time in the Macedonian capital Pella, making his first connections with the Macedonian monarchy.

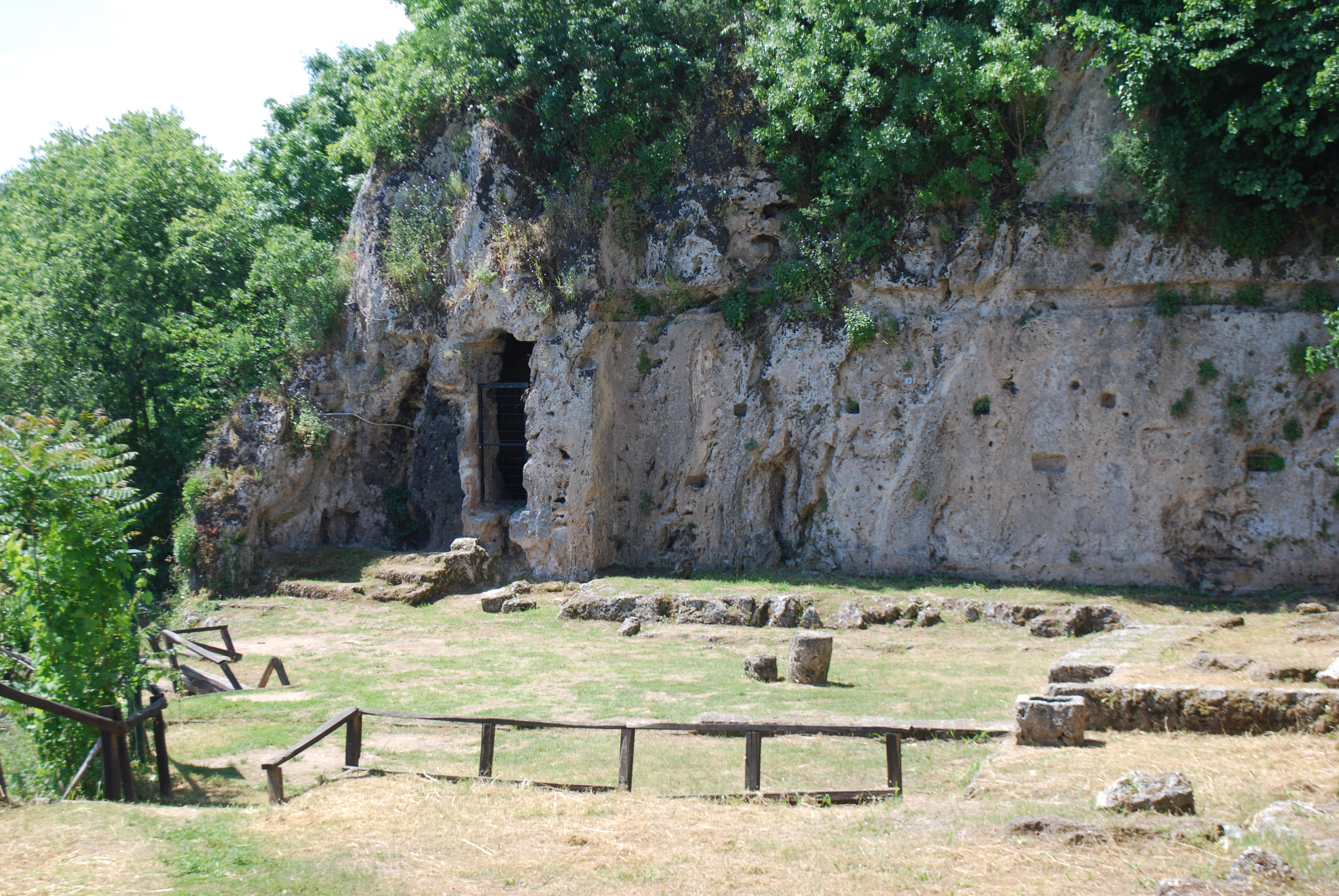
School of Aristotle in Mieza, Macedonia, Greece

At the age of seventeen or eighteen, Aristotle moved to Athens to continue his education at Plato's Academy. He became distinguished as a researcher and lecturer, earning for himself the nickname "mind of the school" by his tutor Plato. In Athens, he probably experienced the Eleusinian Mysteries as he wrote when describing the sights one viewed at the Mysteries, "to experience is to learn" (παθεĩν μαθεĩν). Aristotle remained in Athens for nearly twenty years before leaving in 348/47 BC after Plato's death. The traditional story about his departure records that he was disappointed with the academy's direction after control passed to Plato's nephew Speusippus, although it is possible that the anti-Macedonian sentiments in Athens could have also influenced his decision. Aristotle left with Xenocrates to Assos in Asia Minor, where he was invited by his former fellow student Hermias of Atarneus; he stayed there for a few years, leaving around the time of Hermias' death. (Note: Nussbaum & Osborne 2014, p. 73 write that Hermias died in 345 BC; Hazel 2013, p. 37 places Hermias' death in 342 BC, the same year as Aristotle's trip back to Macedon, while Nawotka 2009, p. 40 mentions that Hermias got arrested in 341 BC.) While at Assos, Aristotle and his colleague Theophrastus did extensive research in botany and marine biology, which they later continued at the near-by island of Lesbos. During this time, Aristotle married Pythias, Hermias's adoptive daughter and niece, and had a daughter whom they also named Pythias.

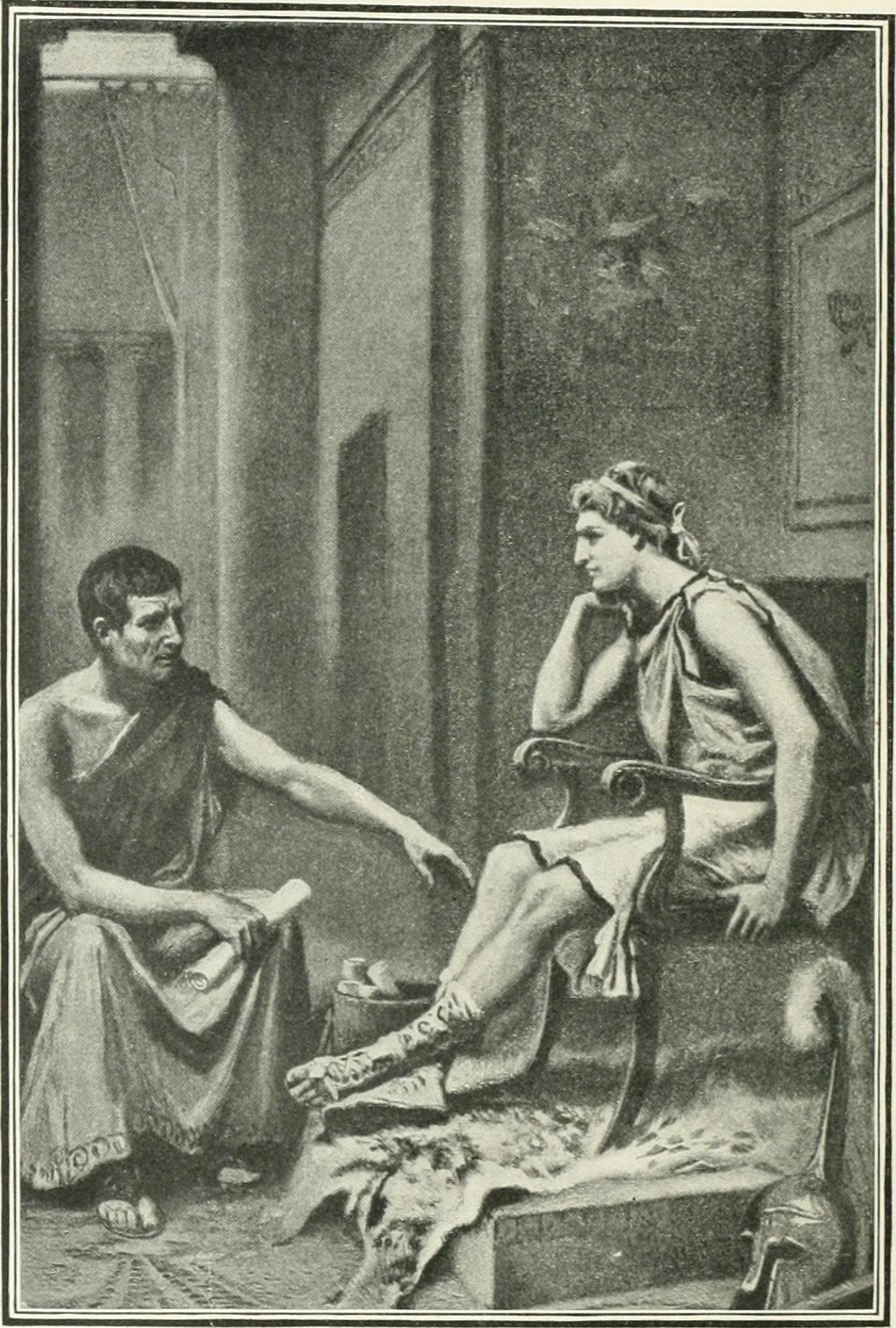
"Aristotle tutoring Alexander" (1895) by Jean Leon Gerome Ferris

In 343/42 BC, Aristotle was invited to Pella by Philip II of Macedon to become the tutor to his thirteen-year-old son Alexander; a choice perhaps influenced by the relationship of Aristotle's family with the Macedonian dynasty. Aristotle taught Alexander at the private school of Mieza, in the gardens of the Nymphs, the royal estate near Pella. Alexander's education probably included a number of subjects, such as ethics and politics, as well as standard literary texts, like Euripides and Homer. It is likely that during Aristotle's time in the Macedonian court, other prominent nobles, like Ptolemy and Cassander, would have occasionally attended his lectures. Aristotle encouraged Alexander toward eastern conquest, and his own attitude towards Persia was strongly ethnocentric. In one famous example, he counsels Alexander to be "a leader to the Greeks and a despot to the barbarians". Alexander's education under the guardianship of Aristotle likely lasted for only a few years, as at around the age of sixteen he returned to Pella and was appointed regent of Macedon by his father Philip. During this time, Aristotle gifted Alexander an annotated copy of the Iliad, which is said to have become one of Alexander's most prized possessions. Scholars speculate that two of Aristotle's now lost works, On kingship and On behalf of the Colonies, were composed by the philosopher for the young prince. Aristotle returned to Athens for the second and final time a year after Philip II's assassination in 336 BC.

As a metic, Aristotle could not own property in Athens and thus rented a building known as the Lyceum (named after the sacred grove of Apollo Lykeios), in which he established his own school. The building included a gymnasium and a colonnade (peripatos), from which the school acquired the name Peripatetic. Aristotle conducted courses and research at the school for the next twelve years. He often lectured small groups of distinguished students and, along with some of them, such as Theophrastus, Eudemus, and Aristoxenus, Aristotle built a large library which included manuscripts, maps, and museum objects. While in Athens, his wife Pythias died and Aristotle became involved with Herpyllis of Stagira. They had a son whom Aristotle named after his father, Nicomachus. This period in Athens, between 335 and 323 BC, is when Aristotle is believed to have composed many of his philosophical works. He wrote many dialogues, of which only fragments have survived. Those works that have survived are in treatise form and were not, for the most part, intended for widespread publication; they are generally thought to be lecture aids for his students. His most important treatises include Physics, Metaphysics, Nicomachean Ethics, Politics, On the Soul and Poetics. Aristotle studied and made significant contributions to "logic, metaphysics, mathematics, physics, biology, botany, ethics, politics, agriculture, medicine, dance, and theatre."

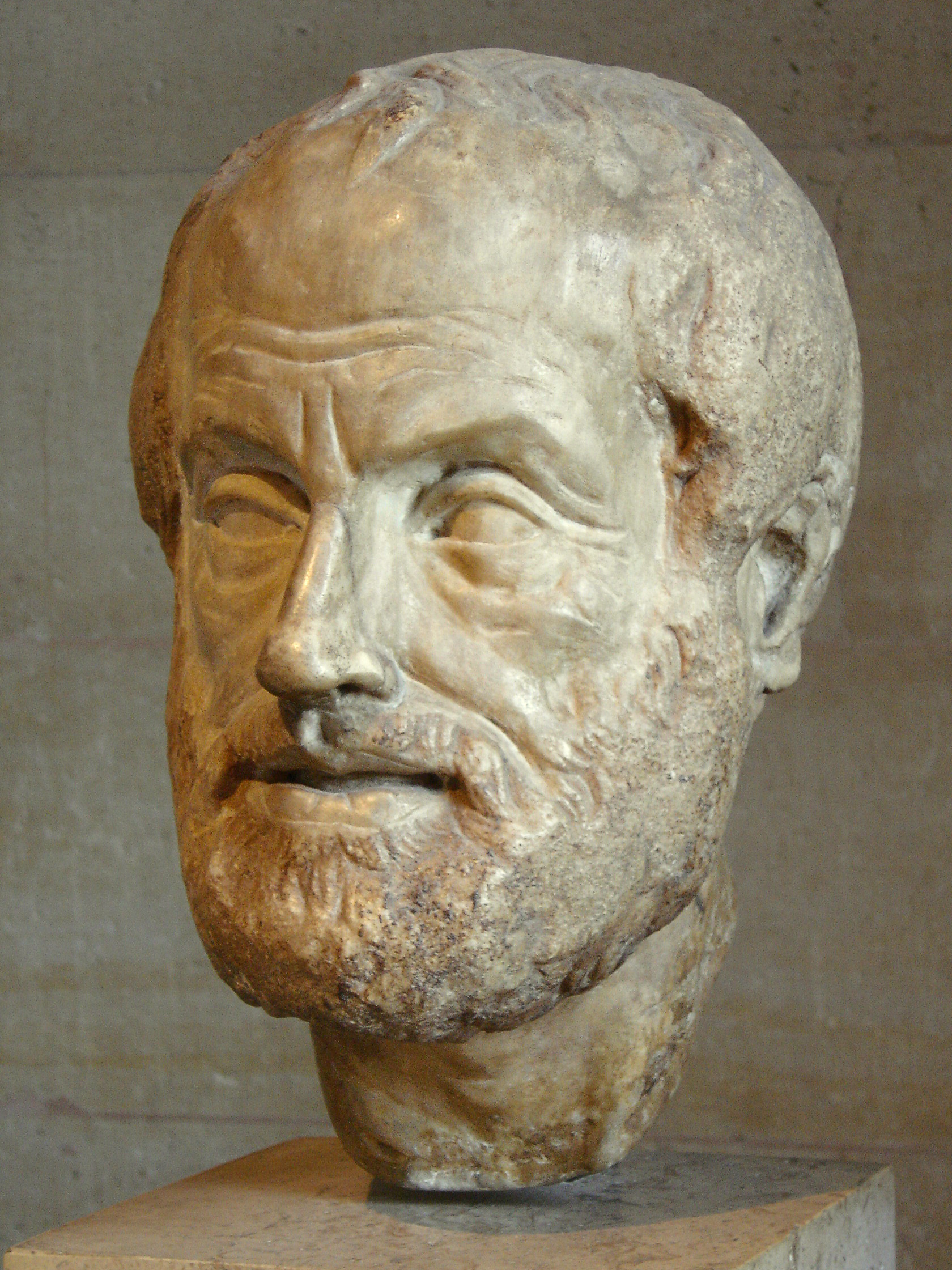
Portrait bust of Aristotle; an Imperial Roman (1st or 2nd century AD) copy of a lost bronze sculpture made by Lysippos

While Alexander deeply admired Aristotle, near the end of his life, the two men became estranged having diverging opinions over issues, such as the optimal administration of city-states, the treatment of conquered populations, such as the Persians, and philosophical questions, like the definition of braveness. A widespread speculation in antiquity suggested that Aristotle played a role in Alexander's death, but the only evidence of this is an unlikely claim made some six years after the death. Following Alexander's death, anti-Macedonian sentiment in Athens was rekindled. In 322 BC, Demophilus and Eurymedon the Hierophant reportedly denounced Aristotle for impiety, prompting him to flee to his mother's family estate in Chalcis, Euboea, at which occasion he was said to have stated "I will not allow the Athenians to sin twice against philosophy" – a reference to Athens's trial and execution of Socrates. He died in Chalcis, Euboea of natural causes later that same year, having named his student Antipater as his chief executor and left a will in which he asked to be buried next to his wife. Aristotle left his works to Theophrastus, his successor as the head of the Lyceum, who in turn passed them down to Neleus of Scepsis in Asia Minor. There, the papers remained hidden for protection until they were purchased by the collector Apellicon. In the meantime, many copies of Aristotle's major works had already begun to circulate and be used in the Lyceum of Athens, Alexandria, and later in Rome.

== Theoretical philosophy ==
=== Logic ===
With the Prior Analytics, Aristotle is credited with the earliest systematic study of logic, and his conception of it was the dominant form of Western logic until 19th-century advances in mathematical logic. Kant even stated in the Critique of Pure Reason that with Aristotle, logic reached its completion.

==== Organon ====
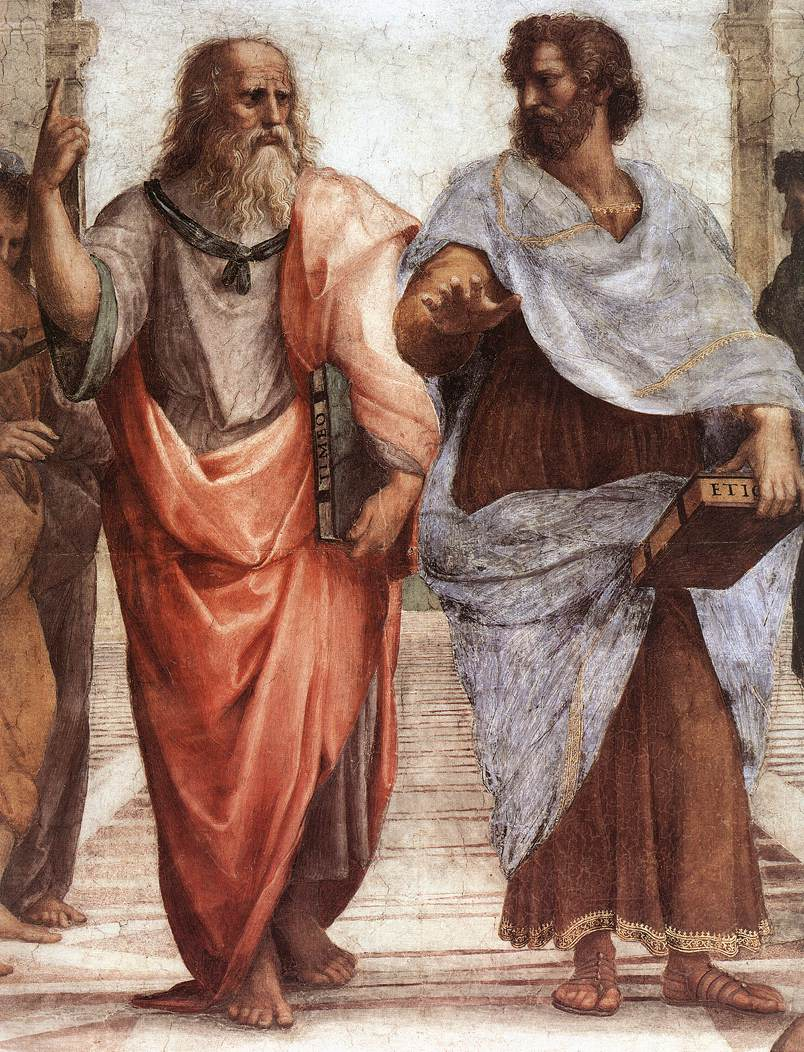
Plato (left) and Aristotle in Raphael's 1509 fresco, The School of Athens. Aristotle holds his Nicomachean Ethics and gestures to the earth, representing his view in immanent realism, whilst Plato gestures to the heavens, indicating his Theory of Forms, and holds his Timaeus.

Most of Aristotle's work is probably not in its original form, because it was most likely edited by students and later lecturers. The logical works of Aristotle were compiled into a set of six books called the Organon around 40 BC by Andronicus of Rhodes or others among his followers. The books are:

1. Categories
2. On Interpretation
3. Prior Analytics
4. Posterior Analytics
5. Topics
6. On Sophistical Refutations

The order of the books (or the teachings from which they are composed) is not certain, but this list was derived from analysis of Aristotle's writings. It goes from the basics, the analysis of simple terms in the Categories, the analysis of propositions and their elementary relations in On Interpretation, to the study of more complex forms, namely, syllogisms and demonstration (in the Analytics) and dialectics (in the Topics and Sophistical Refutations). The first three treatises form the core of the logical theory stricto sensu: the grammar of the language of logic and the correct rules of reasoning. The Rhetoric is not conventionally included, but it states that it relies on the Topics.

==== Syllogism ====
One of Aristotle's types of syllogism (Note: This type of syllogism, with all three terms in 'a', is known by the traditional (medieval) mnemonic Barbara.)
In words	In terms (Note: M is the Middle (here, Men), S is the Subject (Greeks), P is the Predicate (mortal).)	In equations (Note: The first equation can be read as 'It is not true that there exists an x such that x is a man and that x is not mortal.')
All men are mortal. All Greeks are men. ∴ All Greeks are mortal.	M a P S a M S a P	

What is today called Aristotelian logic with its types of syllogism (methods of logical argument), Aristotle himself would have labelled "analytics". The term "logic" he reserved to mean dialectics.

==== Demonstration ====
Aristotle's Posterior Analytics contains his account of demonstration, or demonstrative knowledge, what would today be considered the study of epistemology rather than logic, but which for Aristotle is deeply connected with his account of syllogism. For Aristotle, knowledge is that which is necessarily the case, along with the study of causes.

=== Metaphysics ===
The word "metaphysics" comes from the title of a collection of works by Aristotle bearing that title. However, Aristotle did not use that term himself, which is due to a later compiler, but instead called it "first philosophy" or theology. He distinguished this as "the study of being qua being" which, as opposed to other studies of being, such as mathematics and natural science, studies that which is eternal, unchanging, and immaterial. He wrote in his Metaphysics (1026a16):

If there were no other independent things besides the composite natural ones, the study of nature would be the primary kind of knowledge; but if there is some motionless independent thing, the knowledge of this precedes it and is first philosophy, and it is universal in just this way, because it is first. And it belongs to this sort of philosophy to study being as being, both what it is and what belongs to it just by virtue of being.

==== Substance ====
Aristotle examines the concepts of substance (ousia) and essence (to ti ên einai, "the what it was to be") in his Metaphysics (Book VII), and he concludes that a particular substance is a combination of both matter and form, a philosophical theory called hylomorphism. In Book VIII, he distinguishes the matter of the substance as the substratum, or the stuff of which it is composed. For example, the matter of a house is the bricks, stones, timbers, etc., or whatever constitutes the potential house, while the form of the substance is the actual house, namely 'covering for bodies and chattels' or any other differentia that let us define something as a house. The formula that gives the components is the account of the matter, and the formula that gives the differentia is the account of the form.

===== Moderate realism =====
Plato's forms exist as universals, like the ideal form of an apple. For Aristotle, both matter and form belong to the individual thing (hylomorphism).

Like his teacher Plato, Aristotle's philosophy aims at the universal. Aristotle's ontology has the universal (katholou) exist in a lesser sense than particulars (kath' hekaston), things in the world, whereas for Plato the universal is a realer, separately existing form which particular things merely imitate. For Aristotle, universals still exist, but are only encountered when "instantiated" in a particular substance.

In addition, Aristotle disagreed with Plato about the location of universals. Where Plato spoke of the forms as existing separately from the things that participate in them, Aristotle maintained that universals are multiply located. So, according to Aristotle, the form of apple exists within each apple, rather than in the world of the forms.

===== Potentiality and actuality =====
Concerning the nature of change (kinesis) and its causes, as he outlines in his Physics and On Generation and Corruption (319b–320a), he distinguishes coming-to-be (genesis, also translated as 'generation') from:

1. growth and diminution, which is change in quantity;
2. locomotion, which is change in space; and
3. alteration, which is change in quality.

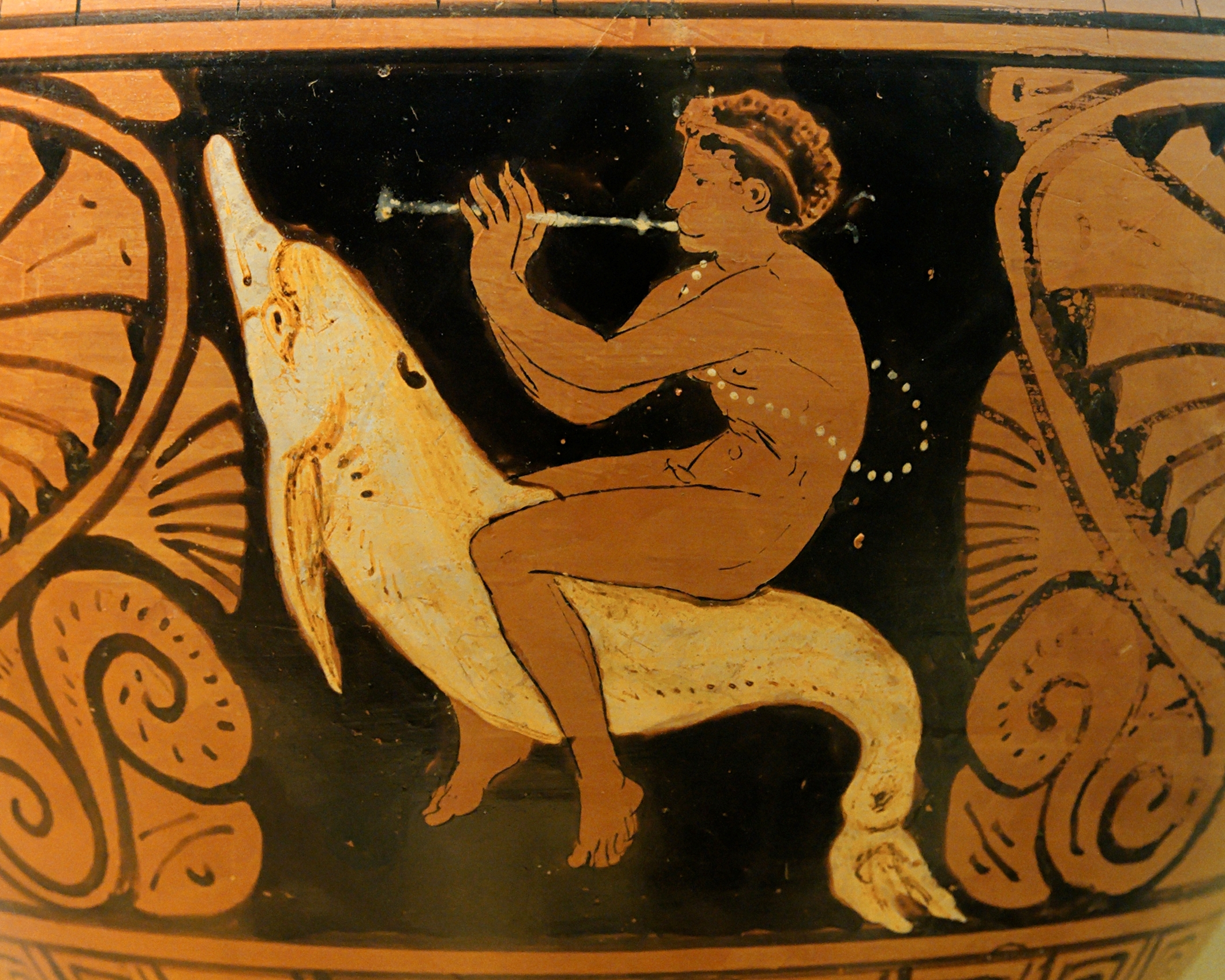
Aristotle argued that a capability like playing the flute could be acquired — the potential made actual — by learning.

Coming-to-be is a change where the substrate of the thing that has undergone the change has itself changed. In that particular change he introduces the concept of potentiality (dynamis) and actuality (entelecheia) in association with the matter and the form. Referring to potentiality, this is what a thing is capable of doing or being acted upon if the conditions are right and it is not prevented by something else. For example, the seed of a plant in the soil is potentially (dynamei) a plant, and if it is not prevented by something, it will become a plant. Potentially, beings can either 'act' (poiein) or 'be acted upon' (paschein), which can be either innate or learned. For example, the eyes possess the potentiality of sight (innate – being acted upon), while the capability of playing the flute can be possessed by learning (exercise – acting). Actuality is the fulfilment of the end of the potentiality. Because the end (telos) is the principle of every change, and potentiality exists for the sake of the end, actuality, accordingly, is the end. Referring then to the previous example, it can be said that an actuality is when a plant does one of the activities that plants do.

For that for the sake of which (to hou heneka) a thing is, is its principle, and the becoming is for the sake of the end; and the actuality is the end, and it is for the sake of this that the potentiality is acquired. For animals do not see in order that they may have sight, but they have sight that they may see.

In summary, the matter used to make a house has potentiality to be a house and both the activity of building and the form of the final house are actualities, which is also a final cause or end. Then Aristotle proceeds and concludes that the actuality is prior to potentiality in formula, in time and in substantiality. With this definition of the particular substance (i.e., matter and form), Aristotle tries to solve the problem of the unity of the beings, for example, "what is it that makes a man one"? Since, according to Plato there are two Ideas: animal and biped, how then is man a unity? However, according to Aristotle, the potential being (matter) and the actual one (form) are one and the same.

== Natural philosophy ==
Aristotle's "natural philosophy" spans a wide range of natural phenomena including those now covered by physics, biology and other natural sciences. In Aristotle's terminology, "natural philosophy" is a branch of philosophy examining the phenomena of the natural world, and includes fields that would be regarded today as physics, biology and other natural sciences. Aristotle's work encompassed virtually all facets of intellectual inquiry. Aristotle makes philosophy in the broad sense coextensive with reasoning, which he also would describe as "science". However, his use of the term science carries a different meaning than that covered by the term "scientific method". For Aristotle, "all science (dianoia) is either practical, poetical or theoretical" (Metaphysics 1025b25). His practical science includes ethics and politics; his poetical science means the study of fine arts including poetry; his theoretical science covers physics, mathematics and metaphysics.

=== Physics ===
The four classical elements (fire, air, water, earth) of Empedocles and Aristotle illustrated with a burning log. The log releases all four elements as it is destroyed.

==== Five elements ====
In his On Generation and Corruption, Aristotle related each of the four elements proposed earlier by Empedocles, earth, water, air, and fire, to two of the four sensible qualities, hot, cold, wet, and dry. In the Empedoclean scheme, all matter was made of the four elements, in differing proportions. Aristotle's scheme added the heavenly aether, the divine substance of the heavenly spheres, stars and planets.

Aristotle's elements
Element	Hot/Cold	Wet/Dry	Motion	Modern state of matter
Earth	Cold	Dry	Down	Solid
Water	Cold	Wet	Down	Liquid
Air	Hot	Wet	Up	Gas
Fire	Hot	Dry	Up	Plasma
Aether	(divine substance)	None	Circular (in heavens)	Vacuum

==== Motion ====
Aristotle describes two kinds of motion: "violent" or "unnatural motion", such as that of a thrown stone, in the Physics (254b10), and "natural motion", such as of a falling object, in On the Heavens (300a20). In violent motion, as soon as the agent stops causing it, the motion stops also: in other words, the natural state of an object is to be at rest, (Note: Rhett Allain notes that Newton's First Law is "essentially a direct reply to Aristotle, that the natural state is not to change motion.) since Aristotle does not address friction. With this understanding, it can be observed that, as Aristotle stated, heavy objects (on the ground, say) require more force to make them move; and objects pushed with greater force move faster. (Note: Leonard Susskind comments that Aristotle had clearly never gone ice skating or he would have seen that it takes force to stop an object.) This would imply the equation
$$F=mv,$$
incorrect in modern physics.

Natural motion depends on the element concerned: the aether naturally moves in a circle around the heavens, (Note: For heavenly bodies like the Sun, Moon, and stars, the observed motions are "to a very good approximation" circular around the Earth's centre, (for example, the apparent rotation of the sky because of the rotation of the Earth, and the rotation of the moon around the Earth) as Aristotle stated.) while the 4 Empedoclean elements move vertically up (like fire, as is observed) or down (like earth) towards their natural resting places. (Note: Drabkin quotes numerous passages from Physics and On the Heavens (De Caelo) which state Aristotle's laws of motion.)

Aristotle's laws of motion. In Physics he states that objects fall at a speed proportional to their weight and inversely proportional to the density of the fluid they are immersed in. This is a correct approximation for objects in Earth's gravitational field moving in air or water.

In the Physics (215a25), Aristotle effectively states a quantitative law, that the speed, v, of a falling body is proportional (say, with constant c) to its weight, W, and inversely proportional to the density, (Note: Drabkin agrees that density is treated quantitatively in this passage, but without a sharp definition of density as weight per unit volume.) ρ, of the fluid in which it is falling:
$$v=c\frac{W}{\rho}$$

Aristotle implies that in a vacuum the speed of fall would become infinite, and concludes from this apparent absurdity that a vacuum is not possible. Opinions have varied on whether Aristotle intended to state quantitative laws. Henri Carteron held the "extreme view" that Aristotle's concept of force was basically qualitative, but other authors reject this.

Archimedes corrected Aristotle's theory that bodies move towards their natural resting places; metal boats can float if they displace enough water; floating depends in Archimedes' scheme on the mass and volume of the object, not, as Aristotle thought, its elementary composition.

Aristotle's writings on motion remained influential until the early modern period. John Philoponus (in late antiquity) and Galileo (in the early modern period) are said to have shown by experiment that Aristotle's claim that a heavier object falls faster than a lighter object is incorrect. A contrary opinion is given by Carlo Rovelli, who argues that Aristotle's physics of motion is correct within its domain of validity, that of objects in the Earth's gravitational field immersed in a fluid such as air. In this system, heavy bodies in steady fall indeed travel faster than light ones (whether friction is ignored, or not), and they do fall more slowly in a denser medium. (Note: Philoponus and Galileo correctly objected that for the transient phase (still increasing in speed) with heavy objects falling a short distance, the law does not apply: Galileo used balls on a short incline to show this. Rovelli notes that "Two heavy balls with the same shape and different weight do fall at different speeds from an aeroplane, confirming Aristotle's theory, not Galileo's.")

Isaac Newton's "forced" motion corresponds to Aristotle's "violent" motion with its external agent, but Aristotle's assumption that the agent's effect stops immediately it stops acting (e.g., the ball leaves the thrower's hand) has awkward consequences: he has to suppose that surrounding fluid helps to push the ball along to make it continue to rise even though the hand is no longer acting on it, resulting in the Medieval theory of impetus.

==== Four causes ====
Aristotle argued by analogy with woodwork that a thing takes its form from four causes: in the case of a table, the wood used (material cause), its design (formal cause), the tools and techniques used (efficient cause), and its decorative or practical purpose (final cause).

Aristotle distinguished between four different "causes"(Ancient Greek: αἰτία, aitia) or explanations for why an object exists or changes:

- The material cause describes the material out of which something is composed. Thus the material cause of a wooden table is the wood it is made of.
- The formal cause is its form, i.e., the arrangement of that matter, the design of the table independent of the specific material it is made of.
- The efficient cause is "the primary source", the modern definition of "cause" as either the agent or agency of particular events or states of affairs. In the case of two dominoes, when the first is knocked over it causes the second to fall. In the case of an animal, this agency is a combination of how it develops from the egg, and how its body functions.
- The final cause (telos) is its purpose, the reason why it exists or is done, or function that something is supposed to serve. In the case of living things, it implies adaptation to a particular way of life.

==== Optics ====
Aristotle was aware of Pythagorean optics. He used optics in his Meteorology, treating it as a science. He viewed optics as stating the laws of sight, thus combining what is now treated as physics and biology. The process of seeing involved the movement of a visible form from the thing seen through the air (or other medium) to the eye, where the form comes to rest. Aristotle does not analyse the nature of this movement; he does not anticipate geometrical optics.

==== Chance and spontaneity ====
According to Aristotle, spontaneity and chance are causes of some things, distinguishable from other types of cause such as simple necessity. Chance as an incidental cause lies in the realm of accidental things, "from what is spontaneous". There is also a more specific kind of chance, which Aristotle names "luck", that only applies to people's moral choices.

=== Astronomy ===
In astronomy, Aristotle refuted Democritus's claim that the Milky Way was made up of "those stars which are shaded by the earth from the sun's rays," pointing out partly correctly that if "the size of the sun is greater than that of the earth and the distance of the stars from the earth many times greater than that of the sun, then... the sun shines on all the stars and the earth screens none of them." He also wrote descriptions of comets, including the Great Comet of 371 BC.

=== Geology and natural sciences ===
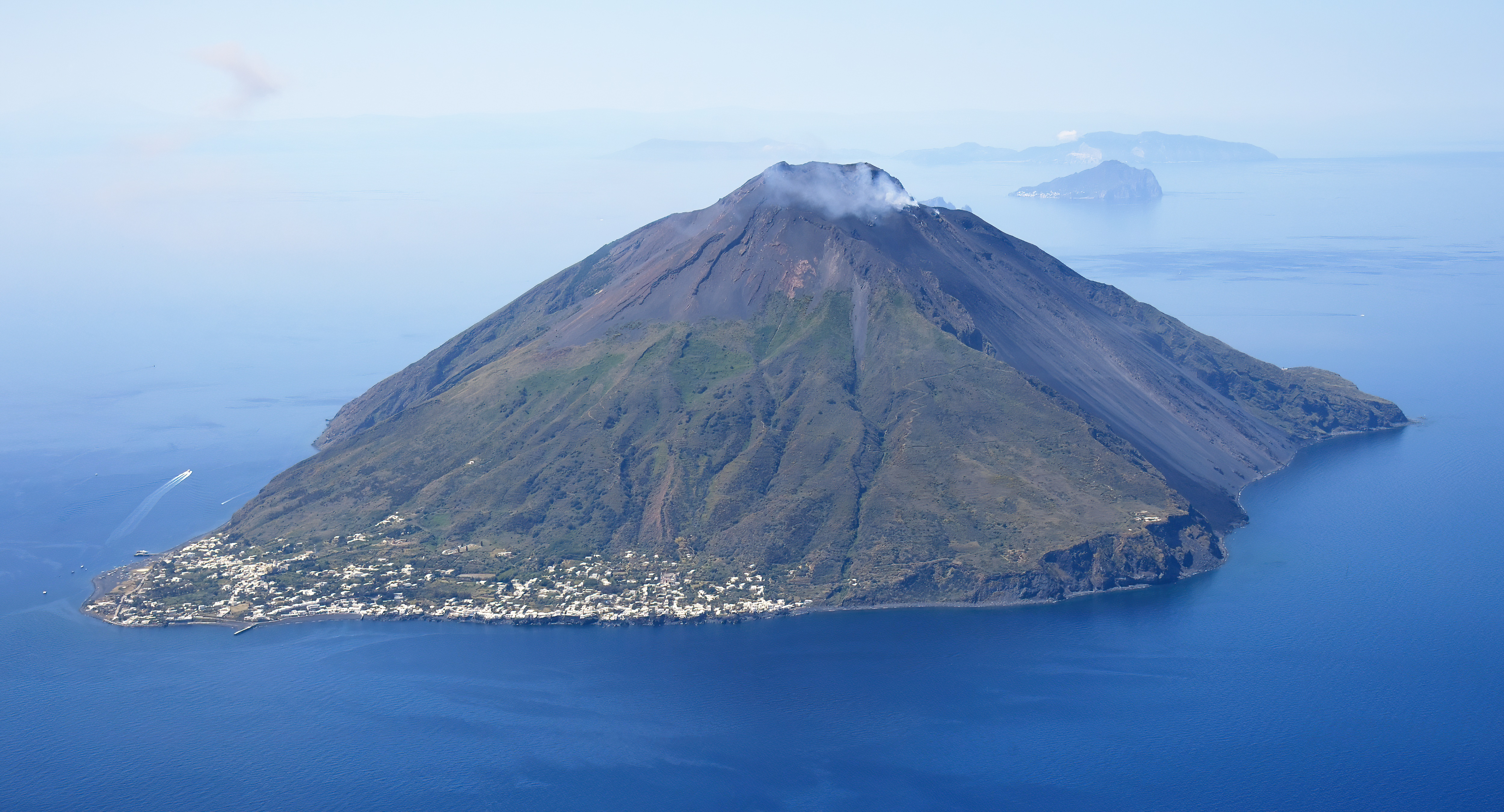
Aristotle noted that the ground level of the Aeolian islands changed before a volcanic eruption.

Aristotle was one of the first people to record any geological observations. He stated that geological change was too slow to be observed in one person's lifetime. The geologist Charles Lyell noted that Aristotle described such change, including "lakes that had dried up" and "deserts that had become watered by rivers", giving as examples the growth of the Nile delta since the time of Homer, and "the upheaving of one of the Aeolian islands, previous to a volcanic eruption."

Meteorologica lends its name to the modern study of meteorology, but its modern usage diverges from the content of Aristotle's ancient treatise on meteors. The ancient Greeks did use the term for a range of atmospheric phenomena, but also for earthquakes and volcanic eruptions. Aristotle proposed that the cause of earthquakes was a gas or vapour (anathymiaseis) that was trapped inside the earth and trying to escape, following other Greek authors Anaxagoras, Empedocles and Democritus.

Aristotle also made many observations about the hydrologic cycle. For example, he made some of the earliest observations about desalination: he observed early – and correctly – that when seawater is heated, freshwater evaporates and that the oceans are then replenished by the cycle of rainfall and river runoff ("I have proved by experiment that salt water evaporated forms fresh and the vapour does not when it condenses condense into sea water again.")

=== Biology ===
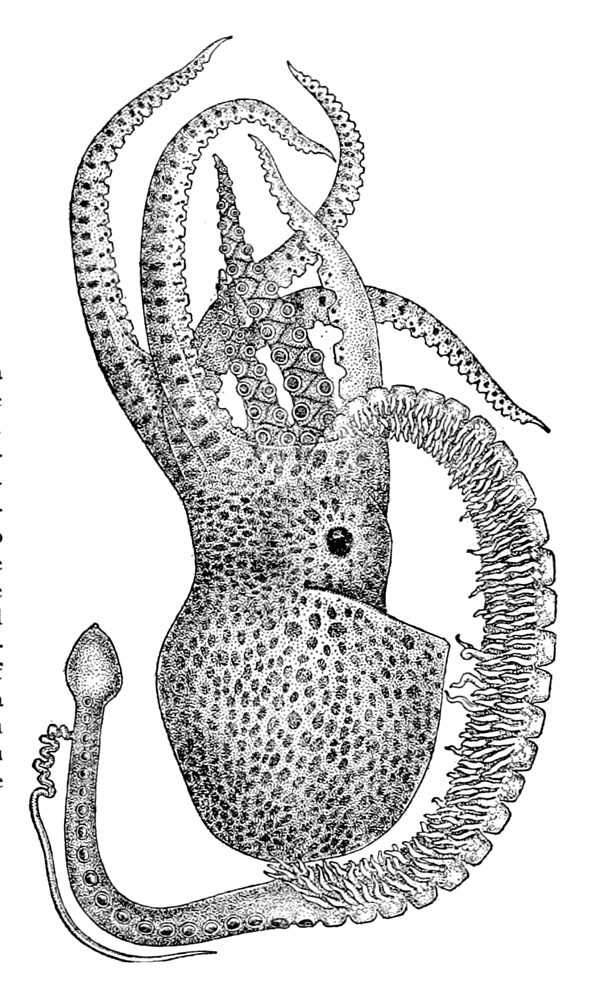
Among many pioneering zoological observations, Aristotle described the reproductive hectocotyl arm of the octopus (bottom left).

==== Empirical research ====
Aristotle was the first person to study biology systematically, and biology forms a large part of his writings. He spent two years observing and describing the zoology of Lesbos and the surrounding seas, including in particular the Pyrrha lagoon in the centre of Lesbos. His data in History of Animals, Generation of Animals, Movement of Animals, and Parts of Animals are from his own observations, statements by knowledgeable people such as beekeepers and fishermen, and accounts by travellers. His apparent emphasis on animals rather than plants is a historical accident: his works on botany have been lost, but two books on plants by his pupil Theophrastus have survived.

Aristotle reports on sea life from observation on Lesbos and the catches of fishermen. He describes the catfish, electric ray, and frogfish, as well as cephalopods such as the octopus and paper nautilus. His description of the hectocotyl arm of cephalopods, used in sexual reproduction, was widely disbelieved until the 19th century. He gives accurate descriptions of the four-chambered stomachs of ruminants, and of the ovoviviparous embryological development of the hound shark.

He notes that an animal's structure is well matched to function so the heron has a long neck, long legs, and a sharp spear-like beak, whereas ducks have short legs and webbed feet. Darwin, too, noted such differences, but unlike Aristotle used the data to come to the theory of evolution. Aristotle's writings can seem to imply evolution, but Aristotle saw mutations or hybridizations as rare accidents, distinct from natural causes. He was thus critical of Empedocles's theory of a "survival of the fittest" origin of living things and their organs, and ridiculed the idea that accidents could lead to orderly results. In modern terms, he nowhere says that different species can have a common ancestor, that one kind can change into another, or that kinds can become extinct.

==== Scientific style ====
Aristotle inferred growth laws from his observations on animals, including that brood size decreases with body mass, whereas gestation period increases.

Aristotle did not do experiments in the modern sense. He made observations, or at most investigative procedures like dissection. In Generation of Animals, he opens a fertilized hen's egg to see the embryo's heart beating inside.

Instead, he systematically gathered data, discovering patterns common to whole groups of animals, and inferring possible causal explanations from these. This style is common in modern biology when large amounts of data become available in a new field, such as genomics. This sets out testable hypotheses and constructs a narrative explanation of what is observed. In this sense, Aristotle's biology is scientific.

From his data, Aristotle inferred rules relating the life-history features of live-bearing tetrapods (terrestrial placental mammals) that he studied. He correctly predicted that brood size decreases with body mass; that lifespan increases with gestation period and with body mass; and that fecundity decreases with lifespan.

==== Classification of living things ====
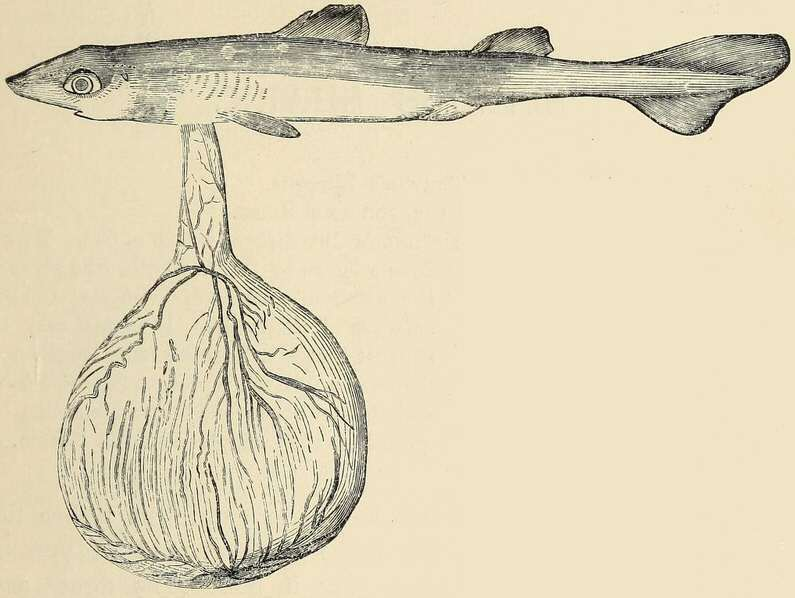
Aristotle recorded that the embryo (fetus pictured) of a dogfish was attached by a cord to a kind of placenta (the yolk sac), like a higher animal; this formed an exception to the linear scale from highest to lowest.

Aristotle distinguished about 500 animal species, arranging them in a nonreligious graded scale of perfection, with man at the top. The highest gave live birth to hot and wet creatures, the lowest laid cold, dry mineral-like eggs. He grouped what a zoologist would call vertebrates as "animals with blood", and invertebrates as "animals without blood". Those with blood were divided into live-bearing (mammals), and egg-laying (birds, reptiles, fish). Those without blood were insects, crustacea and hard-shelled molluscs. He recognised that animals did not exactly fit onto a scale, and noted exceptions, such as that sharks had a placenta. To a biologist, the explanation is convergent evolution. Philosophers of science have concluded that Aristotle was not interested in taxonomy, but zoologists think otherwise.

Aristotle's Scala naturae (highest to lowest)
Group	Examples (given by Aristotle)	Blood	Legs	Souls (Rational, Sensitive, Vegetative)	Qualities (Hot–Cold, Wet–Dry)
Man	Man	with blood	2 legs	R, S, V	Hot, Wet
Live-bearing tetrapods	Cat, hare	with blood	4 legs	S, V	Hot, Wet
Cetaceans	Dolphin, whale	with blood	none	S, V	Hot, Wet
Birds	Bee-eater, nightjar	with blood	2 legs	S, V	Hot, Wet, except Dry eggs
Egg-laying tetrapods	Chameleon, crocodile	with blood	4 legs	S, V	Cold, Wet except scales, eggs
Snakes	Water snake, Ottoman viper	with blood	none	S, V	Cold, Wet except scales, eggs
Egg-laying fishes	Sea bass, parrotfish	with blood	none	S, V	Cold, Wet, including eggs
(Among the egg-laying fishes): placental selachians	Shark, skate	with blood	none	S, V	Cold, Wet, but placenta like tetrapods
Crustaceans	Shrimp, crab	without	many legs	S, V	Cold, Wet except shell
Cephalopods	Squid, octopus	without	tentacles	S, V	Cold, Wet
Hard-shelled animals	Cockle, trumpet snail	without	none	S, V	Cold, Dry (mineral shell)
Larva-bearing insects	Ant, cicada	without	6 legs	S, V	Cold, Dry
Spontaneously generating	Sponges, worms	without	none	S, V	Cold, Wet or Dry, from earth
Plants	Fig	without	none	V	Cold, Dry
Minerals	Iron	without	none	none	Cold, Dry

=== Psychology ===
==== Soul ====
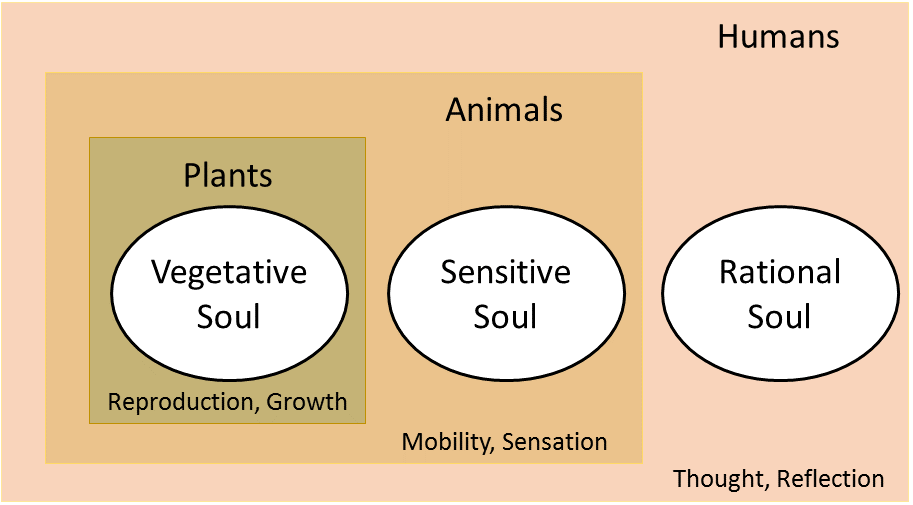
Aristotle proposed a three-part structure for souls of plants, animals, and humans, making humans unique in having all three types of soul.

Aristotle's psychology, in his treatise On the Soul (peri psychēs), posits three kinds of soul (psyches): the vegetative, sensitive, and rational. Humans have all three. The vegetative soul is concerned with growth and nourishment. The sensitive soul experiences sensations and movement. The uniquely human, rational soul receives forms of things and compares them using the nous (intellect) and logos (reason).

For Aristotle, the soul is the form of a living being. Because all beings are composites of form and matter, the form of living beings is that which endows them with what is specific to living beings, e.g., the ability to initiate movement. In contrast to earlier philosophers, but in accordance with the Egyptians, he placed the rational soul in the heart. Aristotle distinguished sensation and thought, unlike previous philosophers except for Alcmaeon.

In On the Soul, Aristotle criticizes Plato's theory of the soul and develops his own in response. Firstly he criticises Plato's Timaeus which holds the soul takes up space and can come into physical contact with bodies. 20th-century scholarship held that Aristotle had here misinterpreted Plato. Aristotle also argued that Plato's view of reincarnation entails that a soul and its body can be mis-matched; in principle, Aristotle alleges, any soul can go with any body, according to Plato's theory.

==== Memory ====
According to Aristotle in On the Soul, memory is the ability to hold a perceived experience in the mind and to distinguish between the internal "appearance" and a past occurrence. A memory is a mental picture (phantasm) that can be recovered. An impression is left on a semi-fluid bodily organ that undergoes changes in order to make a memory. A memory occurs when stimuli such as sights or sounds are so complex that the nervous system cannot receive them all at once. These changes are the same as those involved in sensation, 'common sense', and thinking.

Aristotle uses the term 'memory' for the actual retaining of an experience in the impression that develops from sensation, and for the intellectual anxiety that comes with the impression because it is formed at a particular time and processing specific contents. Memory is of the past, prediction is of the future, and sensation is of the present. Retrieval of impressions cannot be performed suddenly. A transitional channel is needed and located in past experiences, both for previous experience and present experience.

Because Aristotle believed people perceive all kinds of sense perceptions as impressions, people continually weave together new impressions of experiences. To search for impressions, people search memory itself. Within memory, if an experience is offered instead of a specific memory, that person will reject this experience until they find what they are looking for. Recollection occurs when a retrieved experience naturally follows another. If the chain of "images" is needed, one memory stimulates the next. When people recall experiences, they stimulate certain previous experiences until they reach the one that is needed. Recollection is thus the self-directed activity of retrieving information stored in a memory impression. Only humans can remember impressions of intellectual activity, such as numbers and words. Animals that have perception of time can retrieve memories of their past observations. Remembering involves only perception of the things remembered and of the time passed.

Senses, perception, memory, dreams, action in Aristotle's psychology. Impressions are stored in the sensorium (the heart), linked by his laws of association (similarity, contrast, and contiguity).

Aristotle believed the chain of thought that achieves recollection of impressions was connected systematically in relationships such as similarity, contrast, and contiguity, described in his laws of association. Aristotle believed that past experiences are hidden within the mind. A force operates to awaken the hidden material to bring up the actual experience. Association is the power innate in a mental state, which operates upon the unexpressed remains of former experiences, allowing them to be recalled.

==== Dreams ====
Aristotle describes sleep in On Sleep and Wakefulness. It is a result of overuse of the senses or of digestion, and is vital to the body. While a person is asleep, the critical activities, which include thinking, sensing, recalling and remembering, do not function. Since a person cannot sense during sleep, they cannot have desire. However, the senses work during sleep, albeit differently.

Dreams do not involve sensing a stimulus. Sensation is involved, but in an altered manner. Aristotle explains that when a person stares at a moving stimulus such as the waves in a body of water, and then looks away, the next thing they look at appears to have a wavelike motion. When a person perceives a stimulus and it is no longer the focus of their attention, it leaves an impression. When the body is awake, a person constantly encounters new stimuli and so the impressions of previous stimuli are ignored. However, during sleep the impressions made throughout the day are noticed, free of distractions. So, dreams result from these lasting impressions. Since impressions are all that are left, dreams do not resemble waking experience. During sleep, a person is in an altered state of mind, like a person who is overtaken by strong feelings. For example, a person who has a strong infatuation with someone may begin to think they see that person everywhere. Since a person sleeping is in a suggestible state and unable to make judgements, they become easily deceived by what appears in their dreams, like the infatuated person. This leads them to believe the dream is real, even when the dreams are absurd. In De Anima iii 3, Aristotle ascribes the ability to create, to store, and to recall images to the faculty of imagination, phantasia.

One component of Aristotle's theory disagrees with previously held beliefs. He claimed that dreams are not foretelling and not sent by a divine being. Aristotle reasoned that instances in which dreams resemble future events are simply coincidences. Any sensory experience perceived while a person is asleep, such as actually hearing a door close, does not qualify as part of a dream. Images of dreams must be a result of lasting impressions of waking sensory experiences.

== Practical philosophy ==
Aristotle's practical philosophy covers areas such as ethics, politics, economics, and rhetoric.

Virtues and their accompanying vices
Too little	Virtuous mean	Too much
Humbleness	High-mindedness	Vainglory
Lack of purpose	Right ambition	Over-ambition
Spiritlessness	Good temper	Irascibility
Rudeness	Civility	Obsequiousness
Cowardice	Courage	Rashness
Insensibility	Self-control	Intemperance
Sarcasm	Sincerity	Boastfulness
Boorishness	Wit	Buffoonery
Callousness	Just resentment	Spitefulness
Pettiness	Generosity	Vulgarity
Meanness	Liberality	Wastefulness

=== Ethics ===
Aristotle was a virtue ethicist who considered ethics to be a practical rather than theoretical study, i.e., one aimed at becoming good and doing good rather than knowing for its own sake. He wrote several treatises on ethics, most notably including the Nicomachean Ethics.

Aristotle taught that virtue has to do with the proper function (ergon) of a thing. An eye is only a good eye in so much as it can see because the proper function of an eye is sight. Aristotle reasoned that humans must have a function specific to humans, and that this function must be an activity of the psuchē (soul) in accordance with reason (logos). Aristotle identified such an optimum activity (the virtuous mean, between the accompanying vices of excess or deficiency) of the soul as the aim of all human deliberate action, eudaimonia, generally translated as "happiness" or sometimes "well-being". To have the potential of ever being happy in this way necessarily requires a good character (ēthikē aretē), often translated as moral or ethical virtue or excellence.

Aristotle taught that to achieve a virtuous and potentially happy character requires a first stage of having the fortune to be habituated, not deliberately, but by teachers, and experience, leading to a later stage in which one consciously chooses to do the best things, becoming the phronimos or virtuous man. When the best people come to live life this way their practical wisdom (phronesis) and their intellect (nous) can develop with each other towards the highest possible human virtue, the wisdom of an accomplished theoretical or speculative thinker, or in other words, a philosopher.

=== Politics ===
In addition to his works on ethics, which address the individual, Aristotle addressed the city in his work titled Politics. Aristotle considered the city to be a natural community. Moreover, he considered the city to be prior in importance to the family, which in turn is prior to the individual, "for the whole must of necessity be prior to the part". He famously stated that "man is by nature a political animal" and argued that humanity's defining factor among others in the animal kingdom is its rationality. Aristotle conceived of politics as being like an organism rather than like a machine, and as a collection of parts, none of which can exist without the others. Aristotle's conception of the city is organic, and he is considered one of the first to conceive of the city in this manner.

Aristotle's classification of political constitutions

The common modern understanding of a political community as a modern state is quite different from Aristotle's understanding. Although he was aware of the existence and potential of larger empires, the natural community according to Aristotle was the city (polis) which functions as a political "community" or "partnership" (koinōnia). The aim of the city is not just to avoid injustice or for economic stability, but rather to allow at least some citizens the possibility to live a good life, and to perform beautiful acts: "The political partnership must be regarded, therefore, as being for the sake of noble actions, not for the sake of living together." This is distinguished from modern approaches, beginning with social contract theory, according to which individuals leave the state of nature because of "fear of violent death" or its "inconveniences". (Note: For a different reading of social and economic processes in the Nicomachean Ethics and Politics see Polanyi, Karl (1957) "Aristotle Discovers the Economy" in Primitive, Archaic and Modern Economies: Essays of Karl Polanyi ed. G. Dalton, Boston 1971, 78–115.)

In Protrepticus, the character 'Aristotle' states:

For we all agree that the most excellent man should rule, i.e., the supreme by nature, and that the law rules and alone is authoritative; but the law is a kind of intelligence, i.e., a discourse based on intelligence. And again, what standard do we have, what criterion of good things, that is more precise than the intelligent man? For all that this man will choose, if the choice is based on his knowledge, are good things and their contraries are bad. And since everybody chooses most of all what conforms to their own proper dispositions (a just man choosing to live justly, a man with bravery to live bravely, likewise a self-controlled man to live with self-control), it is clear that the intelligent man will choose most of all to be intelligent; for this is the function of that capacity. Hence it's evident that, according to the most authoritative judgment, intelligence is supreme among goods.

As Plato's disciple Aristotle was rather critical concerning democracy and, following the outline of certain ideas from Plato's Statesman, he developed a coherent theory of integrating various forms of power into a so-called mixed state:

It is ... constitutional to take ... from oligarchy that offices are to be elected, and from democracy that this is not to be on a property-qualification. This then is the mode of the mixture; and the mark of a good mixture of democracy and oligarchy is when it is possible to speak of the same constitution as a democracy and as an oligarchy.

— Aristotle. Politics, Book 4, 1294b.10–18

=== Economics ===
Aristotle made substantial contributions to economic thought, especially to thought in the Middle Ages. In Politics, Aristotle addresses the city, property, and trade. His response to criticisms of private property, in Lionel Robbins's view, anticipated later proponents of private property among philosophers and economists, as it related to the overall utility of social arrangements. Aristotle believed that although communal arrangements may seem beneficial to society, and that although private property is often blamed for social strife, such evils in fact come from human nature. In Politics, Aristotle offers one of the earliest accounts of the origin of money. Money came into use because people became dependent on one another, importing what they needed and exporting the surplus. For the sake of convenience, people then agreed to deal in something that is intrinsically useful and easily applicable, such as iron or silver.

Aristotle's discussions on retail and interest was a major influence on economic thought in the Middle Ages. He had a low opinion of retail, believing that contrary to using money to procure things one needs in managing the household, retail trade seeks to make a profit. It thus uses goods as a means to an end, rather than as an end unto itself. He believed that retail trade was in this way unnatural. Similarly, Aristotle considered making a profit through interest unnatural, as it makes a gain out of the money itself, and not from its use.

Aristotle gave a summary of the function of money that was perhaps remarkably precocious for his time. He wrote that because it is impossible to determine the value of every good through a count of the number of other goods it is worth, the necessity arises of a single universal standard of measurement. Money thus allows for the association of different goods and makes them "commensurable". He goes on to state that money is also useful for future exchange, making it a sort of security. That is, "if we do not want a thing now, we shall be able to get it when we do want it".

=== Rhetoric ===
Aristotle's Rhetoric proposes that a speaker can use three basic kinds of appeals to persuade his audience: ethos (an appeal to the speaker's character), pathos (an appeal to the audience's emotion), and logos (an appeal to logical reasoning). He also categorizes rhetoric into three genres: epideictic (ceremonial speeches dealing with praise or blame), forensic (judicial speeches over guilt or innocence), and deliberative (speeches calling on an audience to decide on an issue). Aristotle also outlines two kinds of rhetorical proofs: enthymeme (proof by syllogism) and paradeigma (proof by example).

=== Poetics ===
Aristotle writes in his Poetics that epic poetry, tragedy, comedy, dithyrambic poetry, painting, sculpture, music, and dance are all fundamentally acts of mimesis ("imitation"), each varying in imitation by medium, object, and manner. He applies the term mimesis both as a property of a work of art and also as the product of the artist's intention and contends that the audience's realisation of the mimesis is vital to understanding the work itself. Aristotle states that mimesis is a natural instinct of humanity that separates humans from animals and that all human artistry "follows the pattern of nature". Because of this, Aristotle believed that each of the mimetic arts possesses what Stephen Halliwell calls "highly structured procedures for the achievement of their purposes." For example, music imitates with the media of rhythm and harmony, whereas dance imitates with rhythm alone, and poetry with language. The forms also differ in their object of imitation. Comedy, for instance, is a dramatic imitation of men worse than average; whereas tragedy imitates men slightly better than average. Lastly, the forms differ in their manner of imitation – through narrative or character, through change or no change, and through drama or no drama.

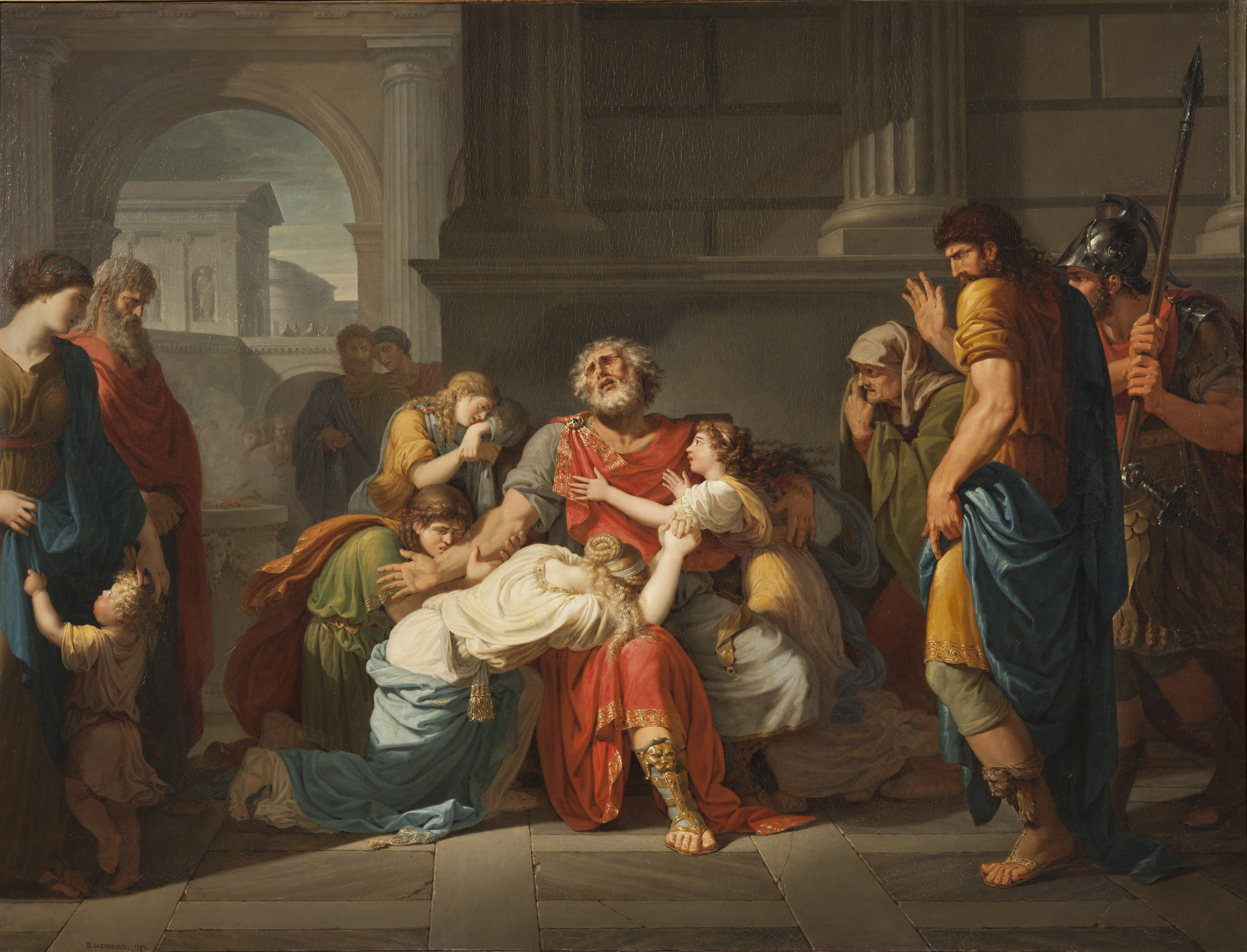
The Blind Oedipus Commending his Children to the Gods (1784) by Bénigne Gagneraux. In his Poetics, Aristotle uses the tragedy Oedipus Tyrannus by Sophocles as an example of how the perfect tragedy should be structured, with a generally good protagonist who starts the play prosperous, but loses everything through some hamartia (fault).

While it is believed that Aristotle's Poetics originally comprised two books – one on comedy and one on tragedy – only the portion that focuses on tragedy has survived. Aristotle taught that tragedy is composed of six elements: plot-structure, character, style, thought, spectacle, and lyric poetry. The characters in a tragedy are merely a means of driving the story; and the plot, not the characters, is the chief focus of tragedy. Tragedy is the imitation of action arousing pity and fear, and is meant to effect the catharsis of those same emotions. Aristotle concludes Poetics with a discussion on which, if either, is superior: epic or tragic mimesis. He suggests that because tragedy possesses all the attributes of an epic, possibly possesses additional attributes such as spectacle and music, is more unified, and achieves the aim of its mimesis in shorter scope, it can be considered superior to epic. Aristotle was a keen systematic collector of riddles, folklore, and proverbs; he and his school had a special interest in the riddles of the Delphic Oracle and studied the fables of Aesop.

== Legacy ==
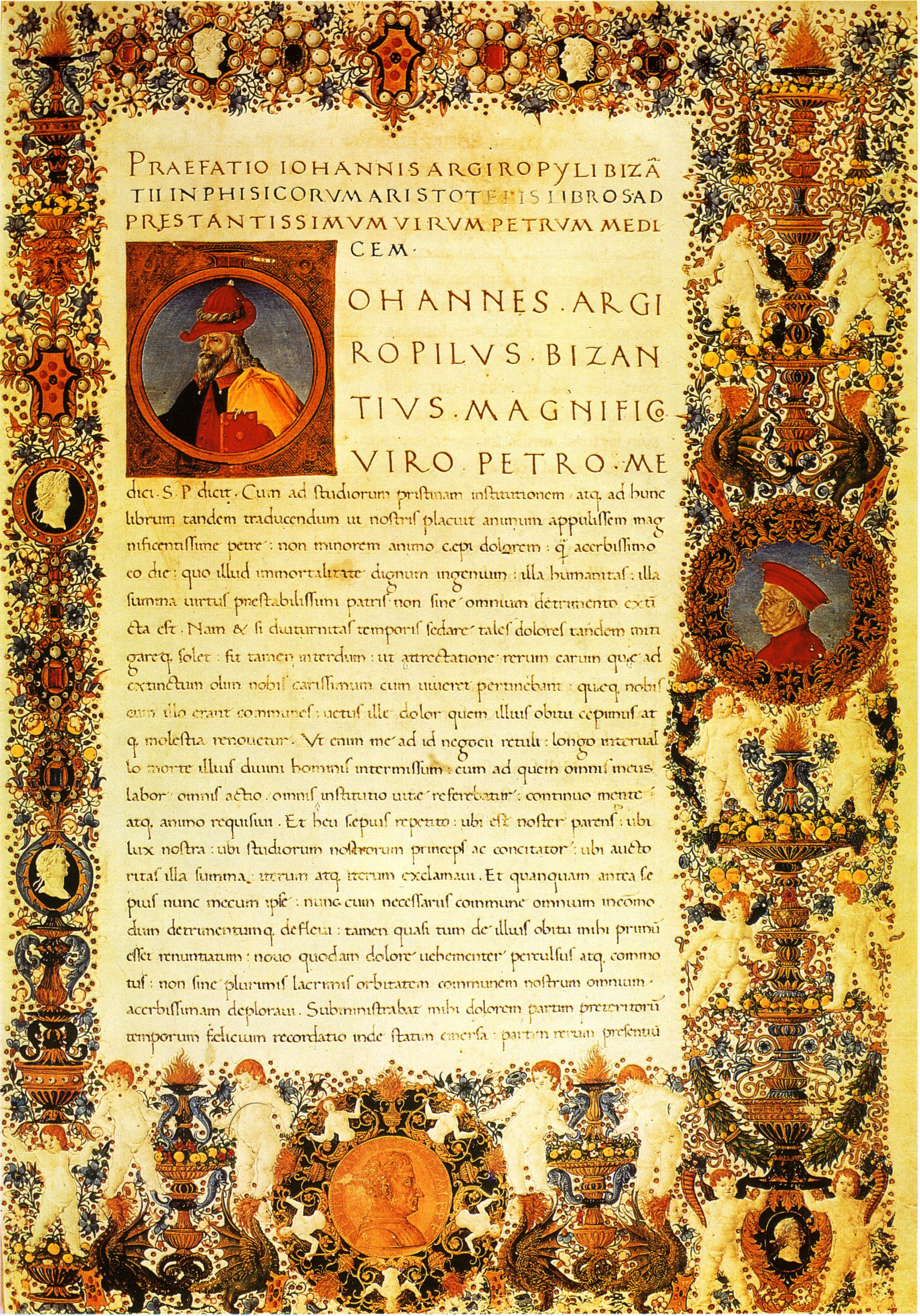
Preface to Argyropoulos's 15th century Latin translation of Aristotle's Physics

More than 2300 years after his death, Aristotle remains one of the most influential people who ever lived. He contributed to almost every field of human knowledge then in existence, and was the founder of many new fields. According to the philosopher Bryan Magee, "it is doubtful whether any human being has ever known as much as he did". Aristotle has been regarded as the first scientist.

Aristotle was the founder of term logic, pioneered the study of zoology, and benefited future scientists and philosophers through his contributions to the scientific method. Taneli Kukkonen, observes that his achievement in founding two sciences is unmatched, and his reach in influencing "every branch of intellectual enterprise" including Western ethical and political theory, theology, rhetoric, and literary analysis is equally long. As a result, Kukkonen argues, any analysis of reality today "will almost certainly carry Aristotelian overtones ... evidence of an exceptionally forceful mind." Kukkonen writes that "in the best 20th-century scholarship Aristotle comes alive as a thinker wrestling with the full weight of the Greek philosophical tradition." Jonathan Barnes wrote that "an account of Aristotle's intellectual afterlife would be little less than a history of European thought".

Aristotle has been called the father of logic, biology, political science, zoology, embryology, natural law, scientific method, rhetoric, psychology, realism, criticism, individualism, teleology, and meteorology. (Note: "the father of logic": Wentzel Van Huyssteen, Encyclopedia of Science and Religion: A–I, p. 27; "the father of biology": S. C. Datt, S. B. Srivastava, Science and society, p. 93.; "the father of political science": N. Jayapalan, Aristotle, p. 12, Jonathan Wolff, Lectures on the History of Moral and Political Philosophy, p. 48.; the "father of zoology": Josef Rudolf Winkler, A Book of Beetles, p. 12; "the father of embryology": D. R. Khanna, Text Book Of Embryology, p. 2; "the father of natural law": Shellens, Max Solomon (1959). "Aristotle on Natural Law". Natural Law Forum. 4 (1): 72–100. doi:10.1093/ajj/4.1.72. ISSN 0065-8995.; "the father of scientific method": Shuttleworth, Martyn. "History of the Scientific Method". Explorable., Riccardo Pozzo (2004) The impact of Aristotelianism on modern philosophy. CUA Press. p. 41. ISBN 0-8132-1347-9; "the father of psychology": Margot Esther Borden, Psychology in the Light of the East, p. 4; "the father of realism": Russell L. Hamm, Philosophy and Education: Alternatives in Theory and Practice, p. 58; "the father of criticism": Nagendra Prasad, Personal Bias in Literary Criticism: Johnson, Matthew Arnold, T. S. Eliot, p. 70. Lord Henry Home Kames, Elements of Criticism, p. 237.; "the father of meteorology":"What is meteorology?". Meteorological Office."94.05.01: Meteorology". Archived from the original on 21 July 2016.; "the father of individualism": Allan Gotthelf, Gregory Salmieri, A Companion to Ayn Rand, p. 325.; "the father of teleology": Malcolm Owen Slavin, Daniel H. Kriegman, The Adaptive Design of the Human Psyche: Psychoanalysis, Evolutionary Biology, and the Therapeutic Process, p. 292.)

What follows is an overview of the transmission and influence of his texts and ideas into the modern era.

=== Ancient ===
==== Hellenistic period ====
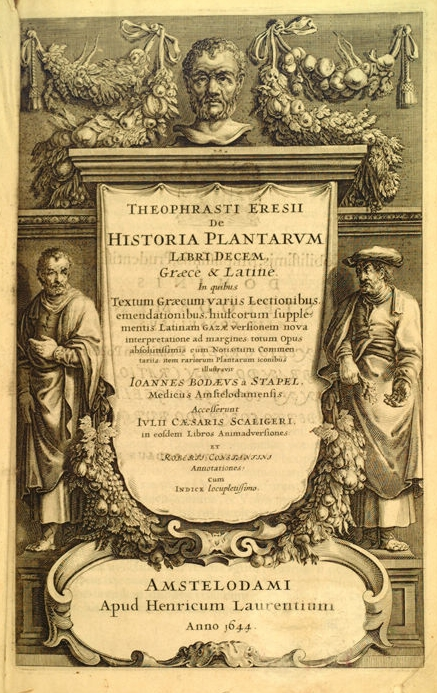
Frontispiece to a 1644 version of Theophrastus's Historia Plantarum, originally written c. 300 BC

The immediate influence of Aristotle's work was felt as the Lyceum grew into the Peripatetic school. Aristotle's students included Aristoxenus, Dicaearchus, Demetrius of Phalerum, Eudemos of Rhodes, Harpalus, Hephaestion, Mnason of Phocis, Nicomachus, and Theophrastus.

Aristotle's pupil and successor, Theophrastus, wrote the History of Plants, a pioneering work in botany. Some of his technical terms remain in use, such as carpel from carpos, fruit, and pericarp, from pericarpion, seed chamber. Theophrastus was much less concerned with formal causes than Aristotle was, instead pragmatically describing how plants functioned.

Under the Ptolemies, the first medical teacher at Alexandria, Herophilus of Chalcedon, corrected Aristotle, placing intelligence in the brain, and connected the nervous system to motion and sensation. Herophilus also distinguished between veins and arteries, noting that the latter pulse while the former do not.

==== Early Roman empire ====
In antiquity, Aristotle's writings were divisible into two groups; the "exoteric" works, intended for the public, and the "esoteric" treatises, for use within the Lyceum school. However, all of the works of Aristotle that have survived from antiquity through medieval manuscript transmission are the technical philosophical treatises from within Aristotle's school, which were compiled in the 1st century BC by Andronicus of Rhodes out of a series of smaller, separate works into the more cohesive, larger works as they are known today.

The primary way that ancient philosophers in the Roman empire engaged with Aristotle's technical work was via philosophical commentary; interpretation and explication of the text of Aristotle along with their own synthesis and views on the topics discussed by Aristotle. The peripatetic commentary tradition began with Boethus of Sidon in the 1st century BC and reached its peak at the end of the 2nd century AD with Alexander of Aphrodisias, who was appointed to the official Imperial chair of Aristotelian philosophy established by Marcus Aurelius, many of whose commentaries still survive.

==== Late antiquity ====
In the 3rd century, Neoplatonism emerged as the dominant philosophical school. The Neoplatonists saw all subsequent philosophical systems after Plato, including Aristotle's, as developments on Plato's philosophy, and sought to explain how Plato and Aristotle were in agreement, even on subjects where they appeared to disagree, and included Aristotle's logical and physical works in their school curriculum as introductory works that needed to be mastered before the study of Plato himself. This study program began with the Categories, which the Neoplatonist philosopher Porphyry of Tyre wrote an introduction to, called Isagoge, which went on to influence subsequent philosophy in late antiquity and the medieval period. Later Neoplatonists in Athens and Alexandria including Syrianus, Ammonius Hermiae, Olympiodorus the Younger and Simplicius of Cilicia wrote further commentaries on Aristotle from a Platonist perspective which are still extant, with Simplicius compiling many of the lost works of his predecessors into massive commentaries that survey the entire Neoplatonic tradition.

With the rise of Christianity and closure of the pagan schools by the order of Justinian in 529, the study of Aristotle and other philosophers in the remainder of the Byzantine period was primarily from a Christian perspective. The first Byzantine Christians to comment extensively on Aristotle were Philoponus, who was a student of Ammonius, and Elias and David, students of Olympiodorus, along with Stephen of Alexandria in the early seventh century, who brought the study of Plato and Aristotle from Alexandria to Constantinople. John Philoponus stands out for having attempted a fundamental critique of Aristotle's views on the eternity of the world, movement, and other elements of Aristotelian thought. Philoponus questioned Aristotle's teaching of physics, noting its flaws and introducing the theory of impetus to explain his observations.

=== Medieval ===
==== Medieval Byzantine empire ====
After a hiatus of several centuries, formal commentary by Eustratius and Michael of Ephesus reappeared in the late eleventh and early twelfth centuries, apparently sponsored by Anna Comnena. Byzantine philosophers also filled in the gaps in the commentaries that had survived down to their time; Alexander of Aphrodisias' commentary on the Metaphysics, of which only the first five books survived, was completed by Michael of Ephesus, who also wrote a commentary on the Sophistical Refutations, the only work of the Organon not to have a commentary, and Michael of Ephesus and Eustratius compiled a number of fragmentary commentaries on the Nicomachean Ethics which they supplemented with their own interpretations. Michael of Ephesus wrote commentaries on the works of Aristotle's animal biology and the Politics, completing the series of commentaries on Aristotle's extant works.

==== Medieval Islamic world ====
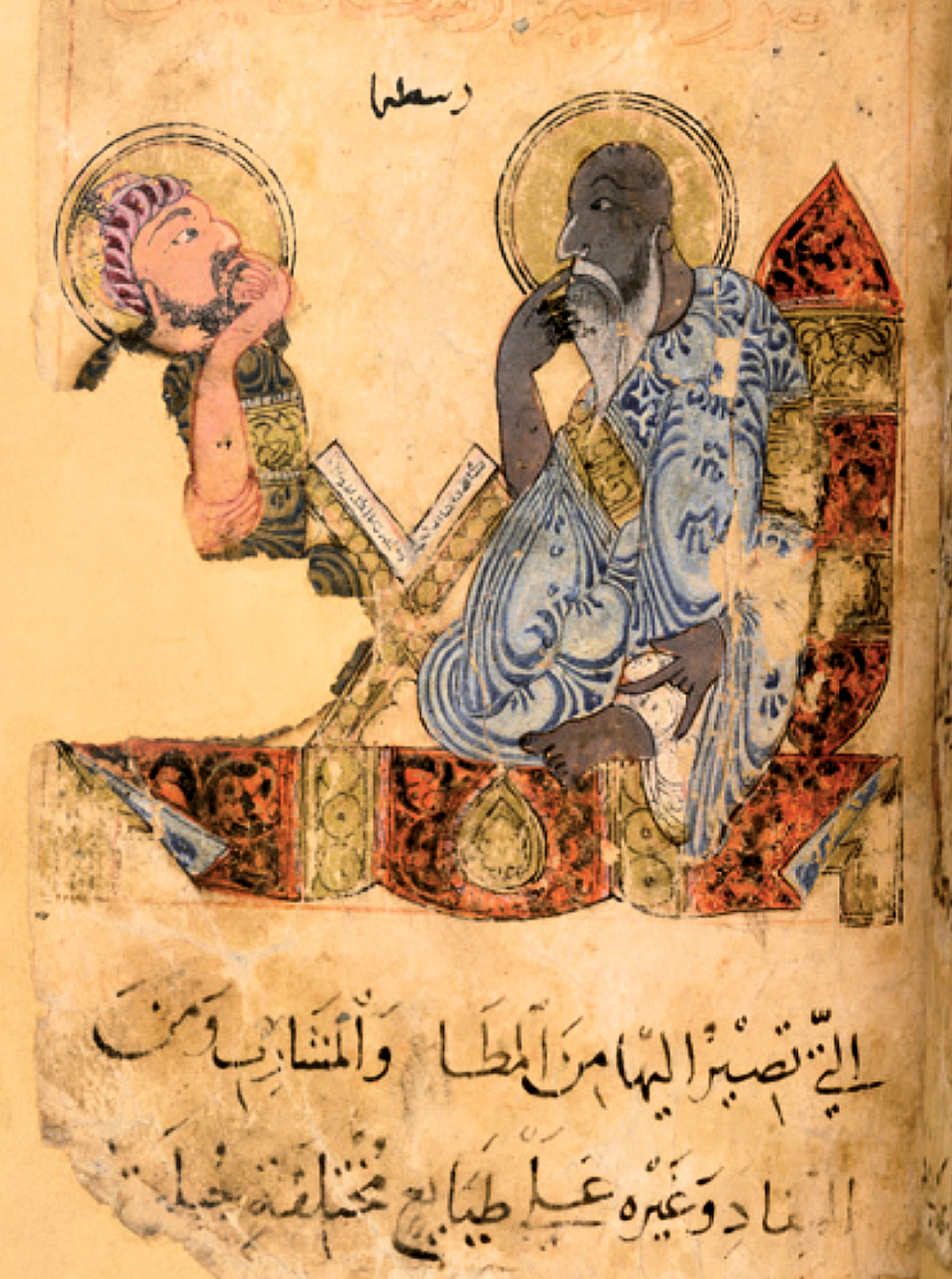
Islamic portrayal of Aristotle (right) in the Kitāb naʿt al-ḥayawān, c. 1220.

Aristotle's works underwent a revival in the Abbasid Caliphate. Translated into Arabic, Aristotle's logic, ethics, and natural philosophy inspired early Islamic scholars. Aristotle is considered the most influential figure in the history of Arabic philosophy and was revered in early Islamic theology. Most surviving works of Aristotle, as well as some of the original Greek commentaries, were translated into Arabic and studied by Muslim philosophers, scientists, and scholars. Through commentaries and critical engagements, figures like Al-Kindi, Al-Farabi, Ibn Sina (Avicenna), and Averroes breathed new life into Aristotle's ideas. They harmonized his logic with Islamic theology, employed his scientific methodology to explore the natural world, and reinterpreted his ethics within the framework of Islamic morality. Islamic thinkers embraced Aristotle's rigorous methods while challenging his conclusions where they diverged from their religious beliefs, which later influenced Thomas Aquinas and other Western Christian scholastic philosophers. Medieval Muslim scholars described Aristotle as the "First Teacher". The title was later used by Western philosophers (as in Dante's poem) who were influenced by the tradition of Islamic philosophy.

==== Medieval Judaism ====
Moses Maimonides (considered to be the foremost intellectual figure of medieval Judaism) adopted Aristotelianism from the Islamic scholars and based his Guide for the Perplexed on it; the work became the basis of Jewish scholastic philosophy. Maimonides also considered Aristotle to be the greatest philosopher that ever lived, and styled him as the "chief of the philosophers". Also, in his letter to Samuel ibn Tibbon, Maimonides observes that there is no need for Samuel to study the writings of philosophers who preceded Aristotle because the works of the latter are "sufficient by themselves and [superior] to all that were written before them. His intellect, Aristotle's is the extreme limit of human intellect, apart from him upon whom the divine emanation has flowed forth to such an extent that they reach the level of prophecy, there being no level higher".

==== Medieval Western Europe ====
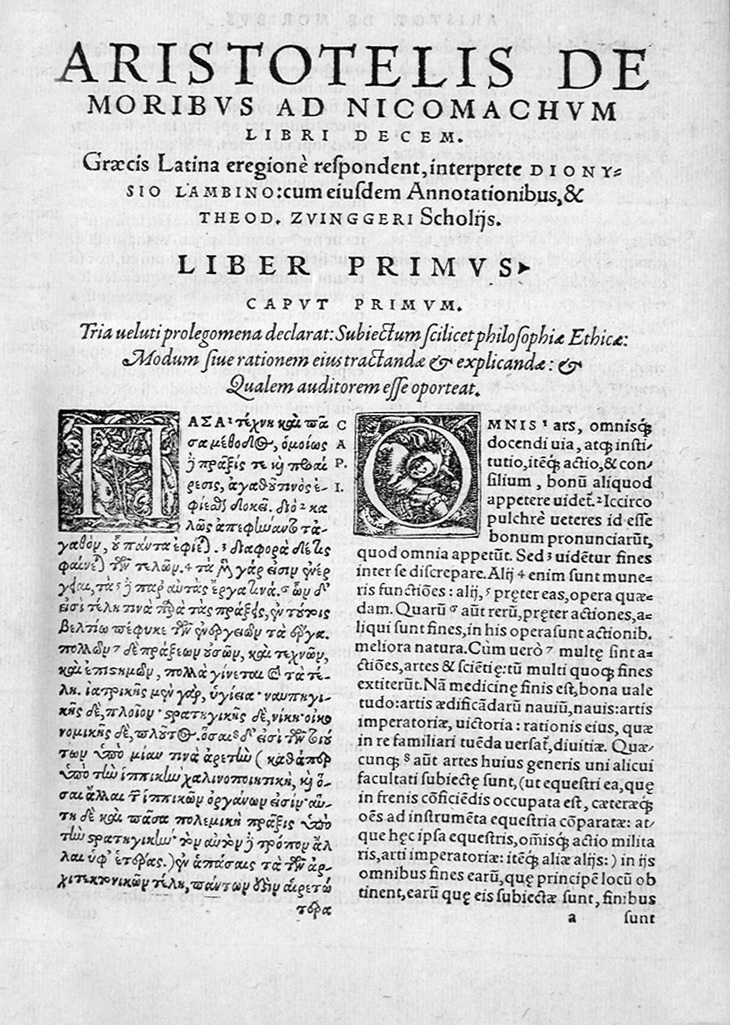
First page of a 1566 edition of the Nicomachean Ethics in Greek and Latin

With the loss of the study of ancient Greek in the early medieval Latin West, Aristotle was practically unknown there from c. AD 600 to c. 1100 except through the Latin translation of the Organon made by Boethius. In the twelfth and thirteenth centuries, interest in Aristotle revived and Latin Christians had translations made, both from Arabic translations, such as those by Gerard of Cremona, and from the original Greek, such as those by James of Venice and William of Moerbeke.

After the scholastic Thomas Aquinas wrote his Summa Theologica, working from Moerbeke's translations and calling Aristotle "The Philosopher", the demand for Aristotle's writings grew, and the Greek manuscripts returned to the West, stimulating a revival of Aristotelianism in Europe that continued into the Renaissance. These thinkers blended Aristotelian philosophy with Christianity, bringing the thought of Ancient Greece into the Middle Ages. Scholars such as Boethius, Peter Abelard, and John Buridan worked on Aristotelian logic.

According to scholar Roger Theodore Lafferty, Dante built up the philosophy of the Comedy on a foundation of Aristotle, just as the scholastics used Aristotle as the basis for their thinking. Dante knew Aristotle directly from Latin translations of his works and indirectly through quotations in the works of Albert Magnus. Dante acknowledges Aristotle's influence explicitly in the poem, when Virgil justifies the Inferno's structure by citing the Nicomachean Ethics. Dante refers to him as "he / Who is acknowledged Master of those who know".

=== Modern era ===
==== Early Modern science ====
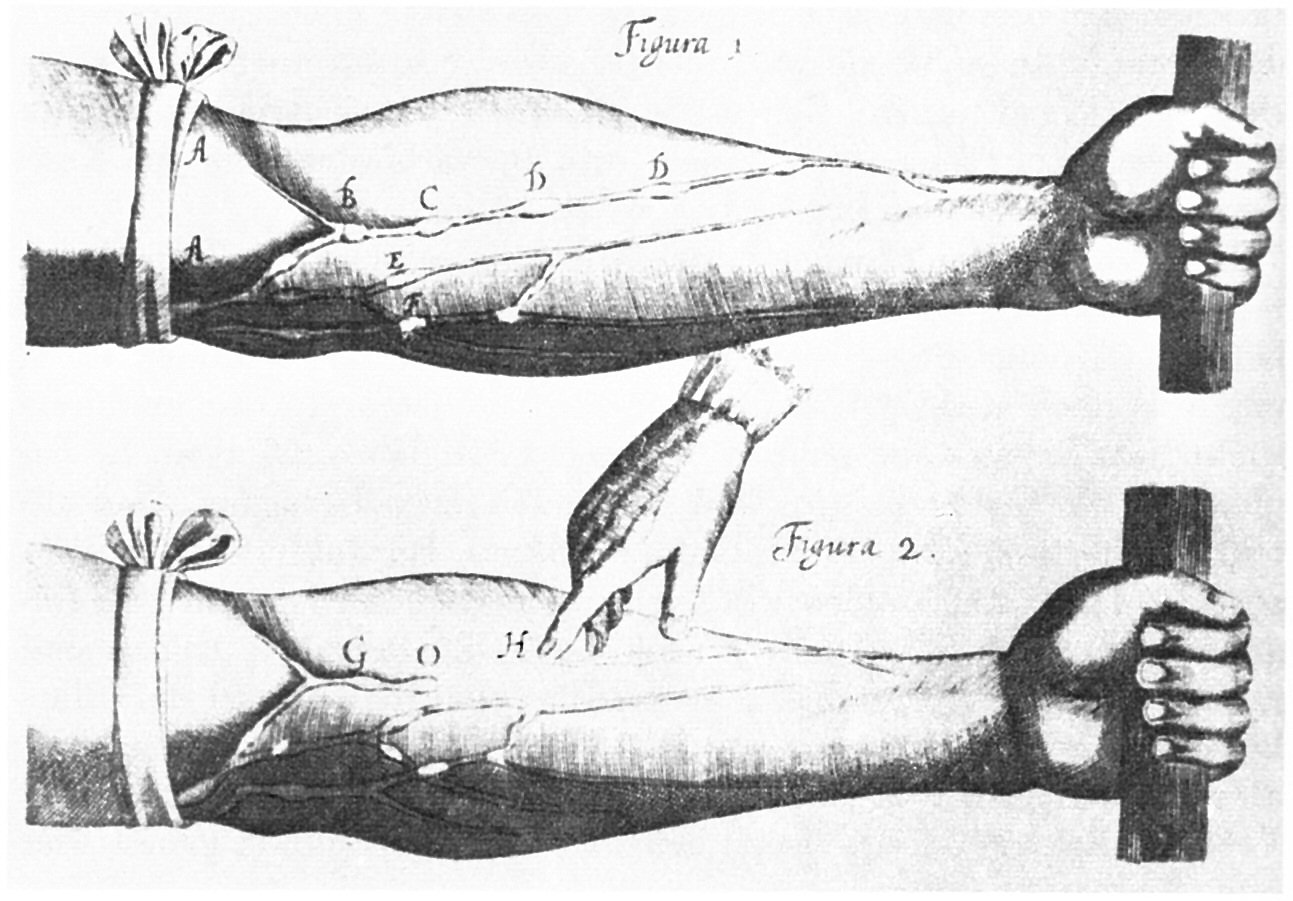
William Harvey's De Motu Cordis, 1628, showed that the blood circulated, contrary to classical thinking.

In the early modern period, scientists such as William Harvey in England and Galileo Galilei in Italy reacted against the theories of Aristotle and other classical era thinkers like Galen, establishing new theories based to some degree on observation and experiment. Harvey demonstrated the circulation of the blood, establishing that the heart functioned as a pump rather than being the seat of the soul and the controller of the body's heat, as Aristotle thought. Galileo used more doubtful arguments to displace Aristotle's physics, proposing that bodies all fall at the same speed whatever their weight.

==== 18th and 19th-century science ====
The English mathematician George Boole fully accepted Aristotle's logic, but decided "to go under, over, and beyond" it with his system of algebraic logic in his 1854 book The Laws of Thought. This gives logic a mathematical foundation with equations, enables it to solve equations as well as check validity, and allows it to handle a wider class of problems by expanding propositions of any number of terms, not just two.

Charles Darwin regarded Aristotle as the most important contributor to the subject of biology. In an 1882 letter he wrote that "Linnaeus and Cuvier have been my two gods, though in very different ways, but they were mere schoolboys to old Aristotle". Also, in later editions of the book "On the Origin of Species', Darwin traced evolutionary ideas as far back as Aristotle; the text he cites is a summary by Aristotle of the ideas of the earlier Greek philosopher Empedocles.

==== Present science ====
The philosopher Bertrand Russell claimed that "almost every serious intellectual advance has had to begin with an attack on some Aristotelian doctrine". Russell called Aristotle's ethics "repulsive", and labelled his logic "as definitely antiquated as Ptolemaic astronomy". Russell stated that these errors make it difficult to do historical justice to Aristotle, until one remembers what an advance he made upon all of his predecessors.

The Dutch historian of science Eduard Jan Dijksterhuis writes that Aristotle and his predecessors showed the difficulty of science by "proceed[ing] so readily to frame a theory of such a general character" on limited evidence from their senses. In 1985, the biologist Peter Medawar could still state in "pure seventeenth century" tones that Aristotle had assembled "a strange and generally speaking rather tiresome farrago of hearsay, imperfect observation, wishful thinking and credulity amounting to downright gullibility".

Zoologists have frequently mocked Aristotle for errors and unverified secondhand reports. However, modern observation has confirmed several of his more surprising claims. Aristotle's work remains largely unknown to modern scientists, though zoologists sometimes mention him as the father of biology or in particular of marine biology. Practising zoologists are unlikely to adhere to Aristotle's chain of being, but its influence is still perceptible in the use of the terms "lower" and "upper" to designate taxa such as groups of plants. The evolutionary biologist Armand Marie Leroi has reconstructed Aristotle's biology, while Niko Tinbergen's four questions, based on Aristotle's four causes, are used to analyse animal behaviour; they examine function, phylogeny, mechanism, and ontogeny. The concept of homology began with Aristotle; the evolutionary developmental biologist Lewis I. Held commented that he would be interested in the concept of deep homology. In systematics too, recent studies consider that Aristotle made important contributions to taxonomy and biological nomenclature.

== Depictions in art ==
=== Paintings ===
Aristotle has been depicted by major artists including Lucas Cranach the Elder, Justus van Gent, Raphael, Paolo Veronese, Jusepe de Ribera, Rembrandt, and Francesco Hayez over the centuries. Among the best-known depictions is Raphael's fresco The School of Athens, in the Vatican's Apostolic Palace, where the figures of Plato and Aristotle are central to the image, at the architectural vanishing point, reflecting their importance. Rembrandt's Aristotle with a Bust of Homer, too, is a celebrated work, showing the knowing philosopher and the blind Homer from an earlier age: as the art critic Jonathan Jones writes, "this painting will remain one of the greatest and most mysterious in the world, ensnaring us in its musty, glowing, pitch-black, terrible knowledge of time."

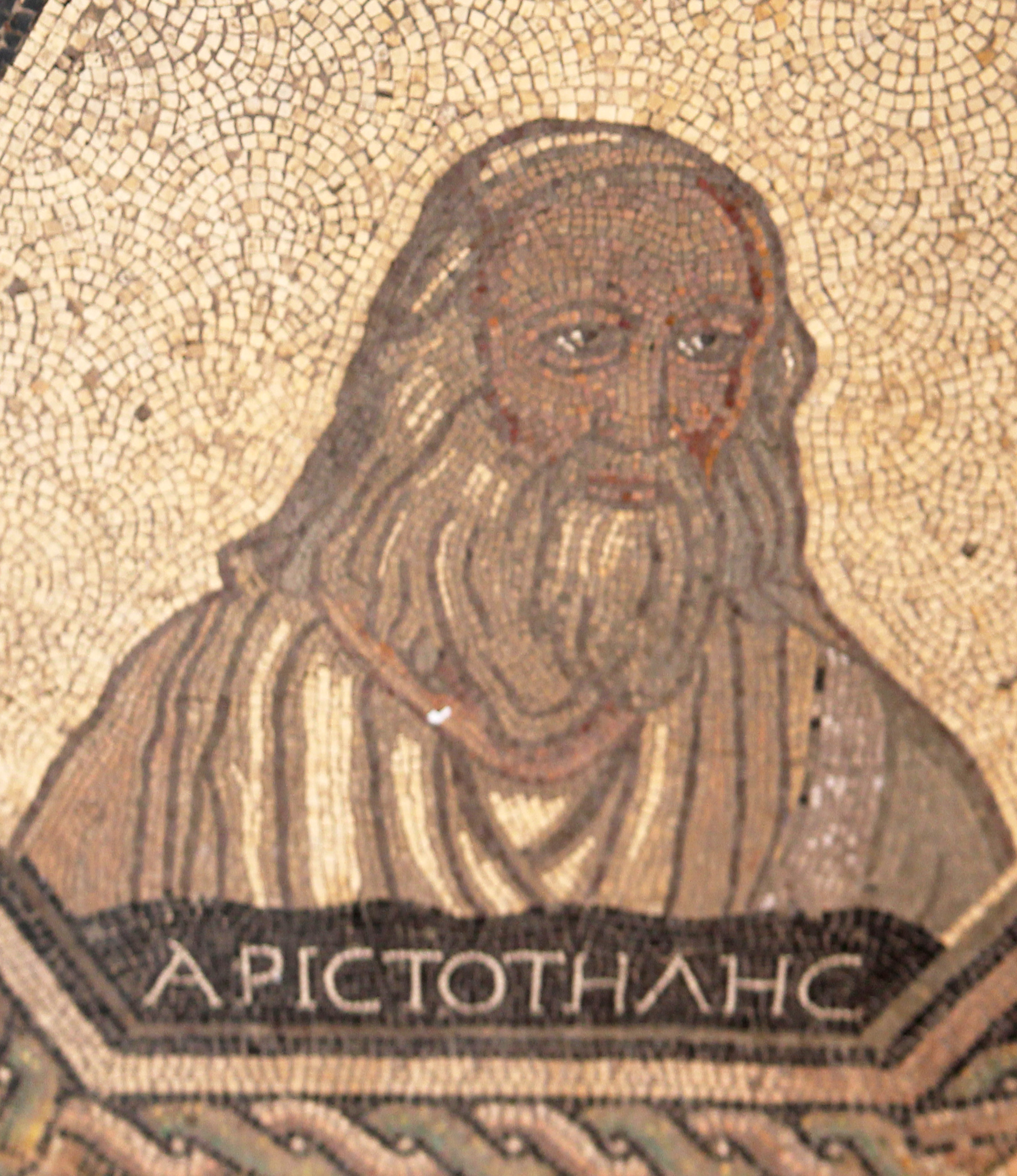
Aristotle, mosaic from a Roman villa in Cologne

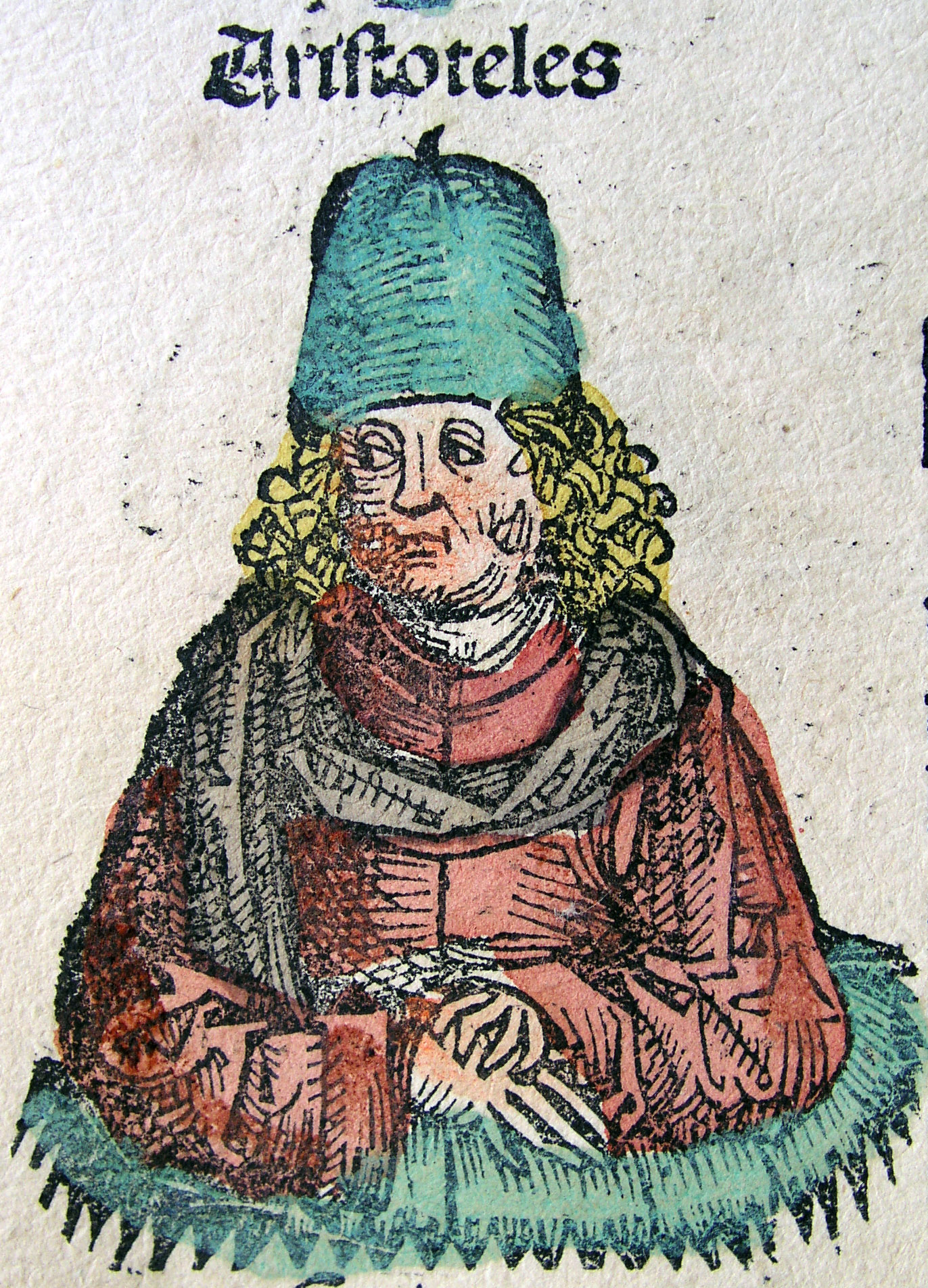
Nuremberg Chronicle anachronistically shows Aristotle in a medieval scholar's clothing. Ink and watercolour on paper, 1493

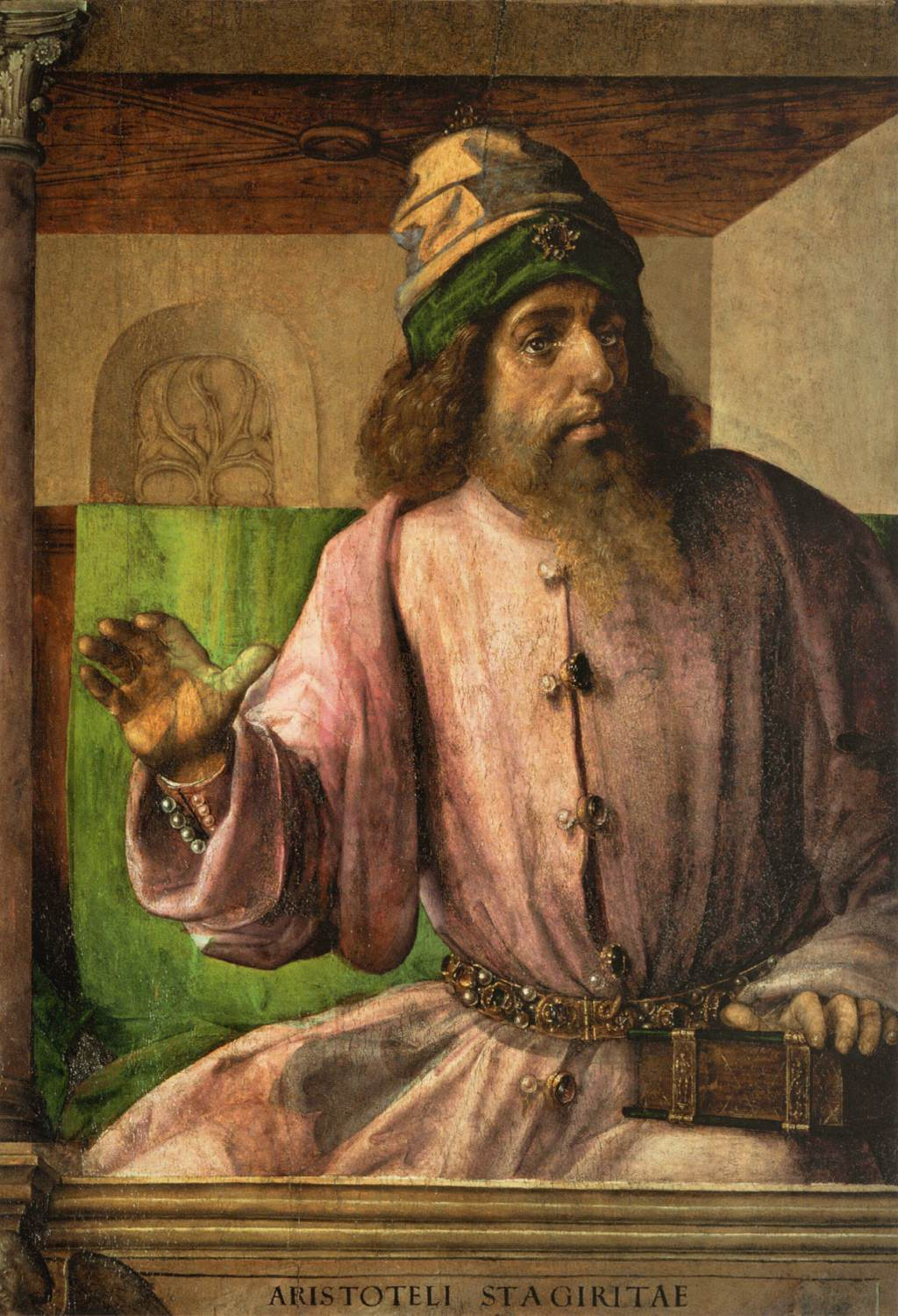
Aristotle by Justus van Gent. Oil on panel, c. 1476

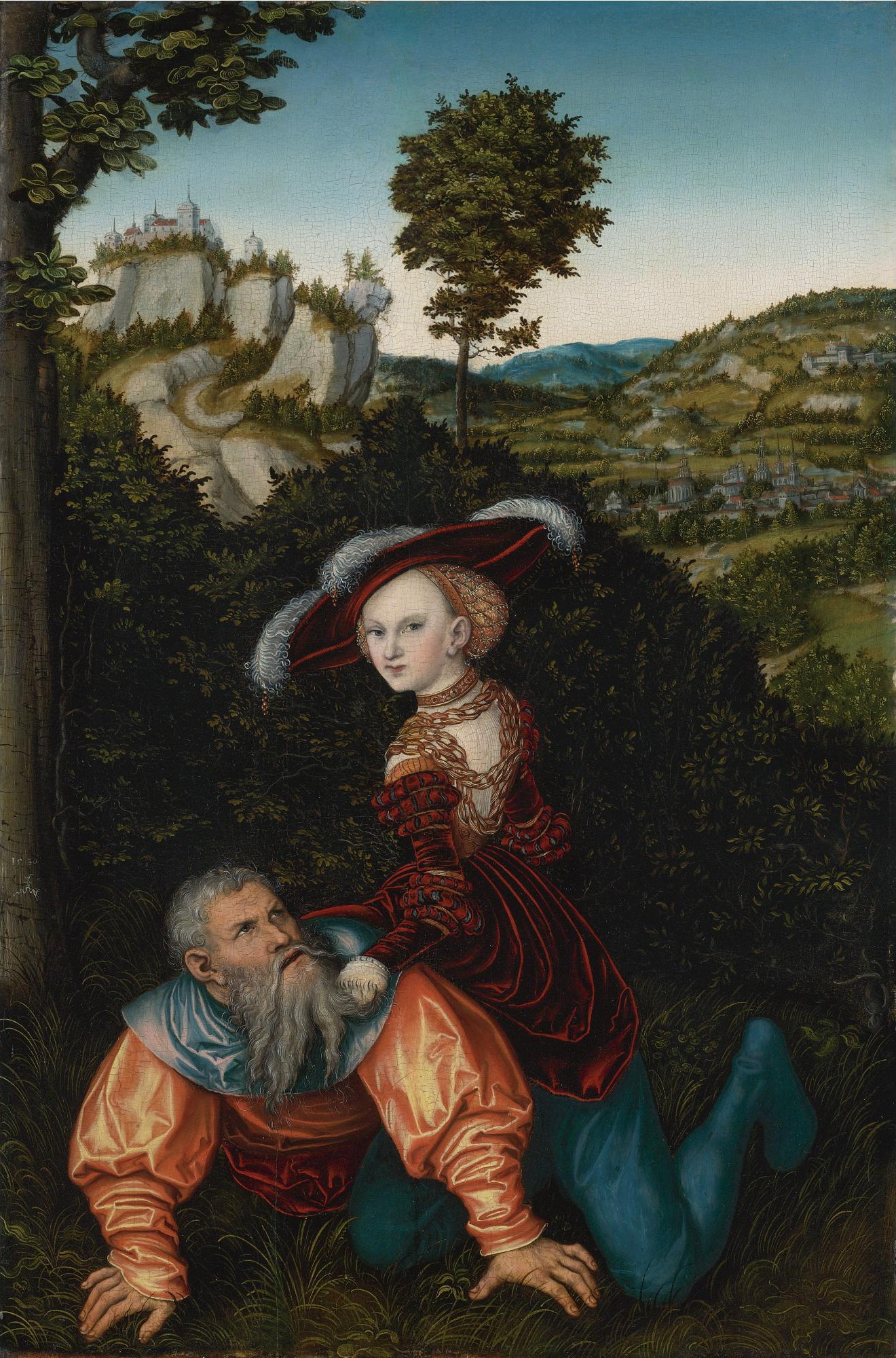
Phyllis and Aristotle by Lucas Cranach the Elder. Oil on panel, 1530

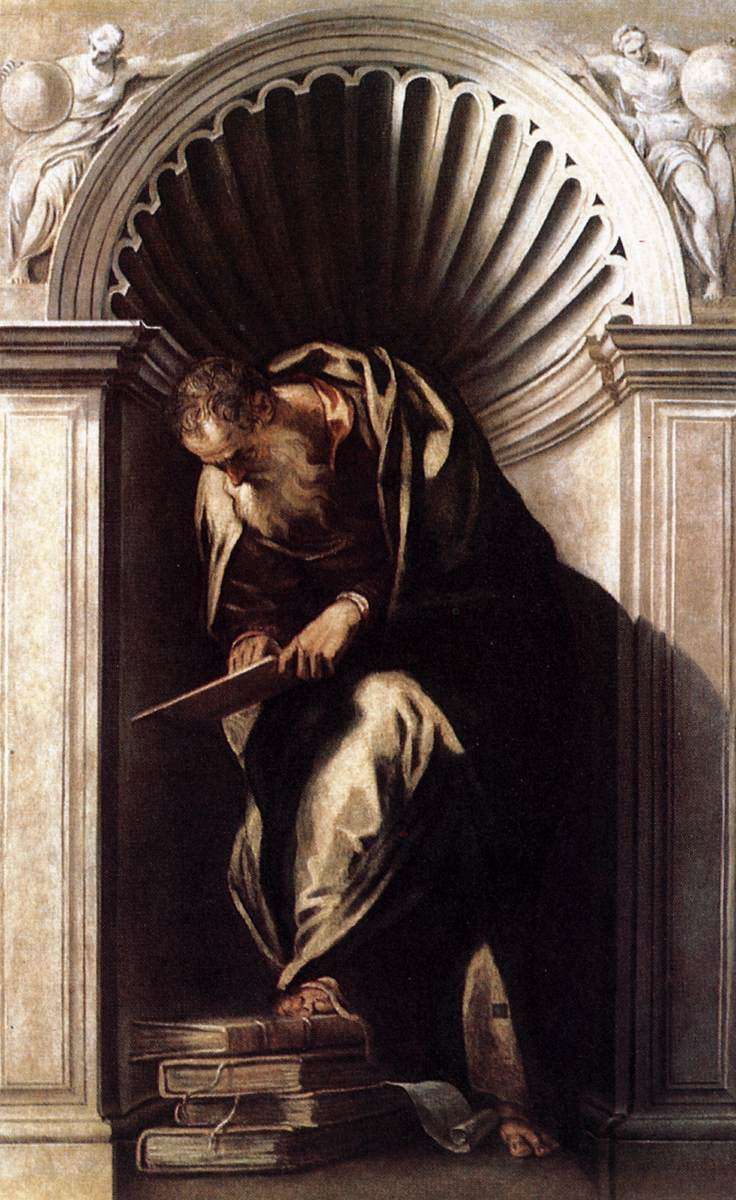
Aristotle by Paolo Veronese. Oil on canvas, 1560s

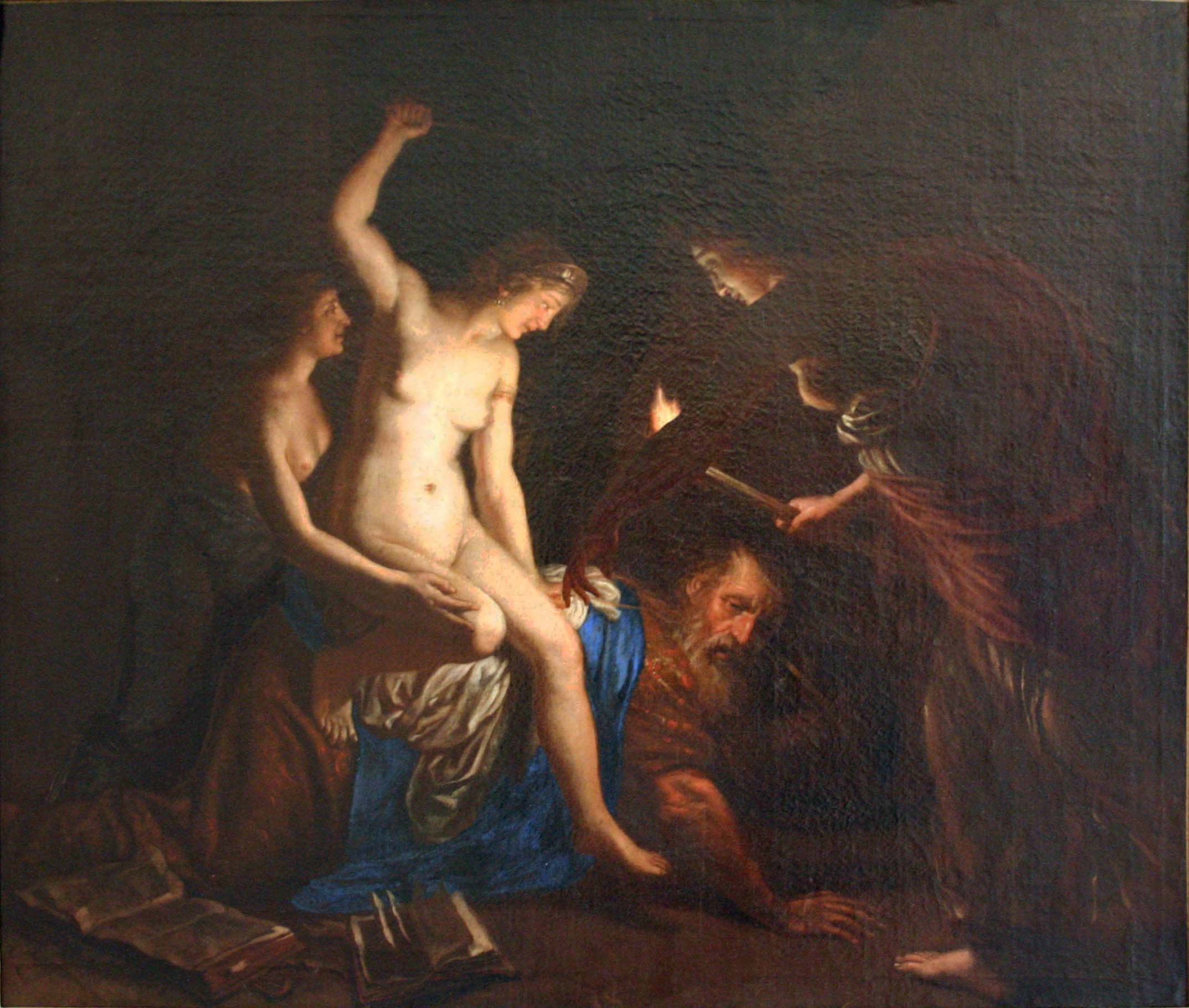
Aristotle and Campaspe, (Note: Compare the medieval tale of Phyllis and Aristotle above.) Alessandro Turchi (attrib.) Oil on canvas, 1713

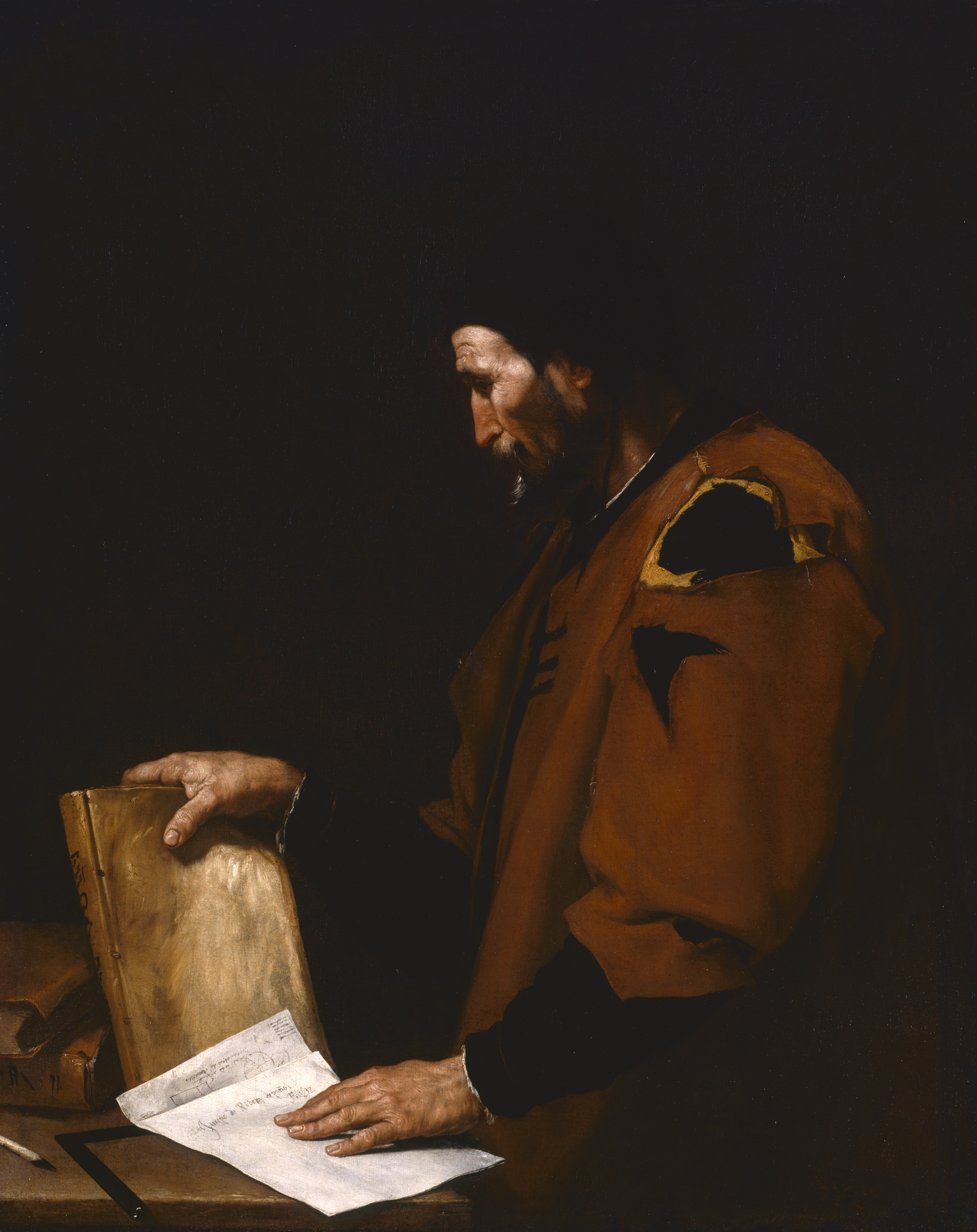
Aristotle by Jusepe de Ribera. Oil on canvas, 1637

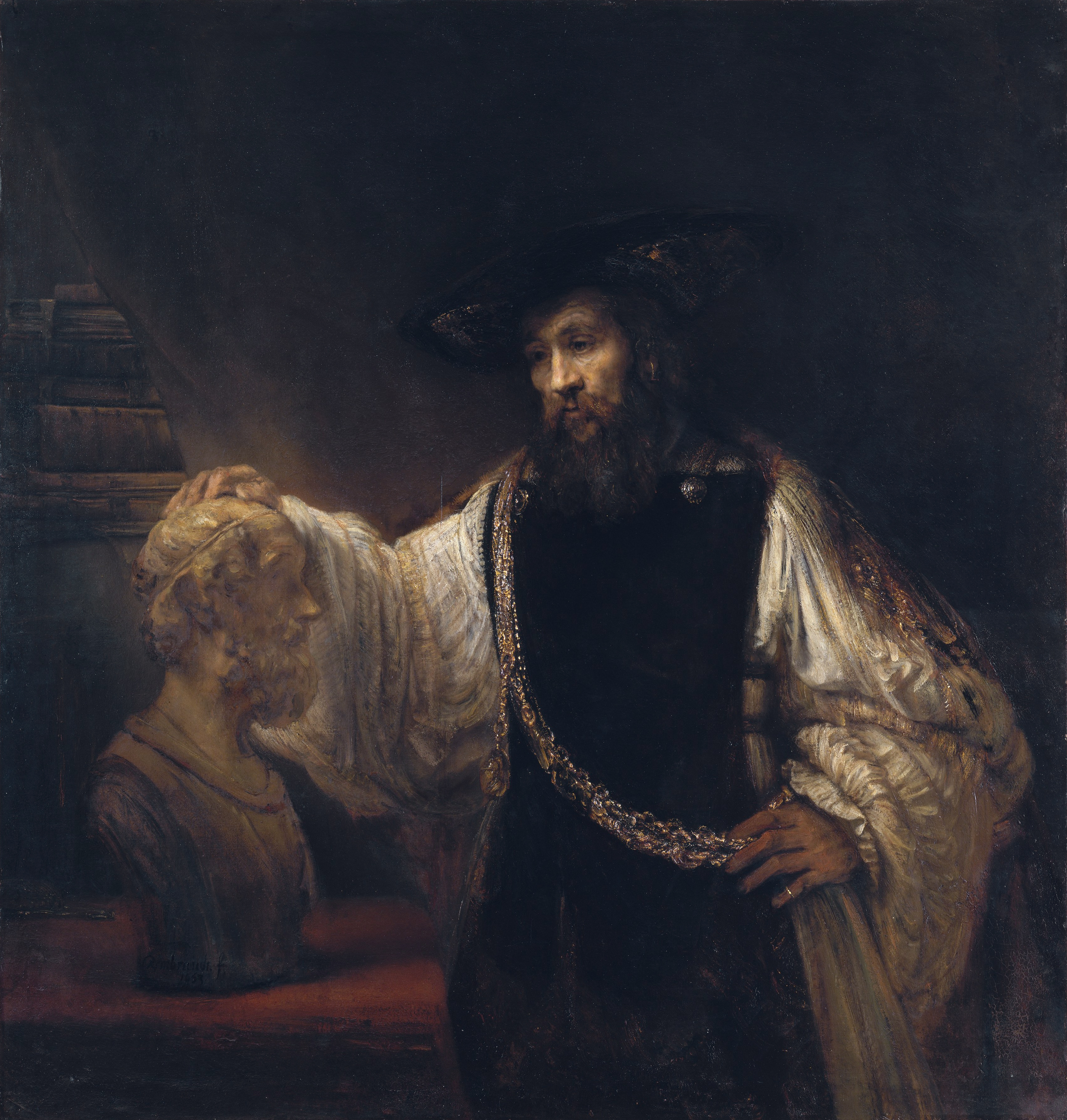
Aristotle with a Bust of Homer by Rembrandt. Oil on canvas, 1653

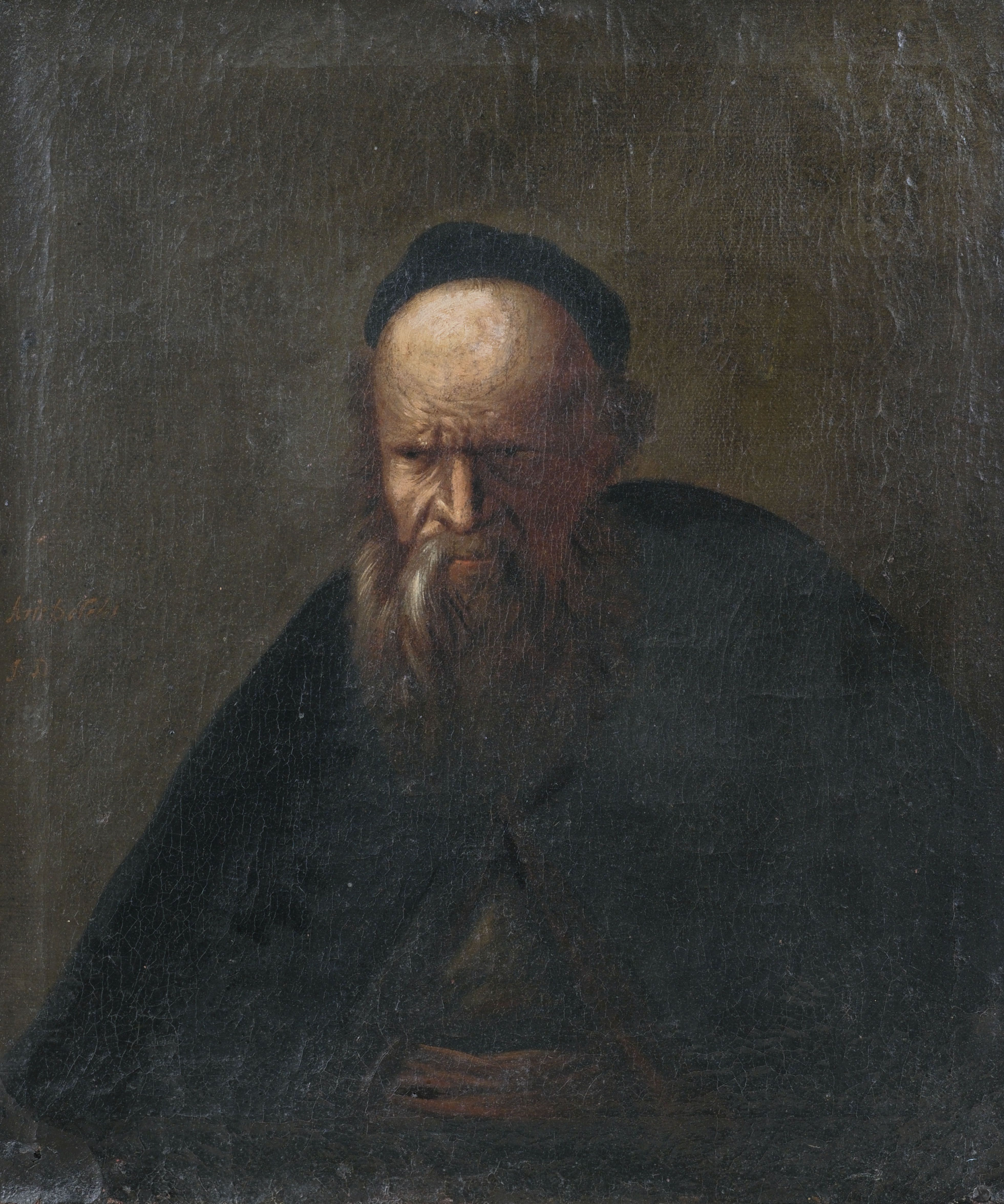
Aristotle by Johann Jakob Dorner the Elder. Oil on canvas, 1813

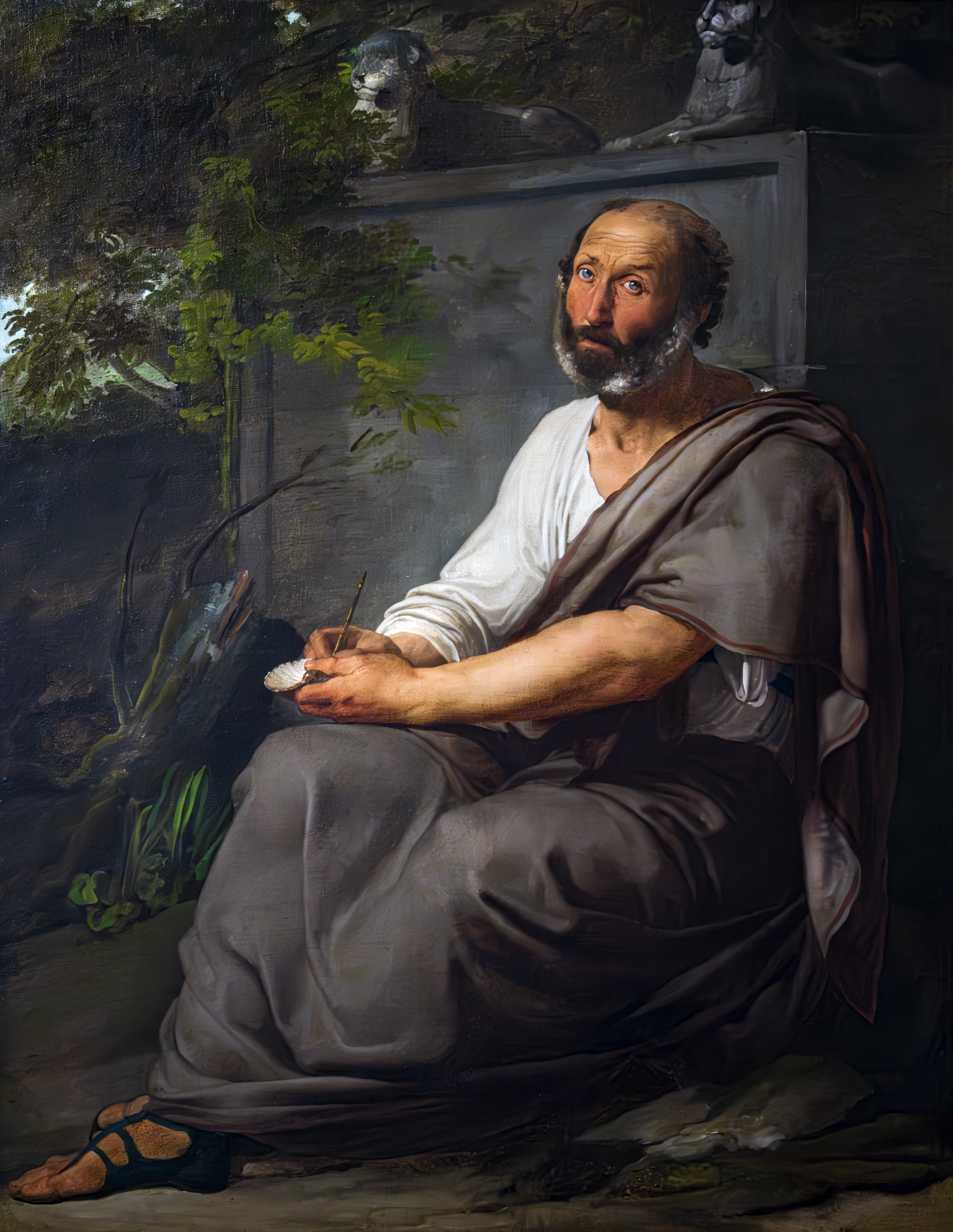
Aristotle by Francesco Hayez. Oil on canvas, 1811

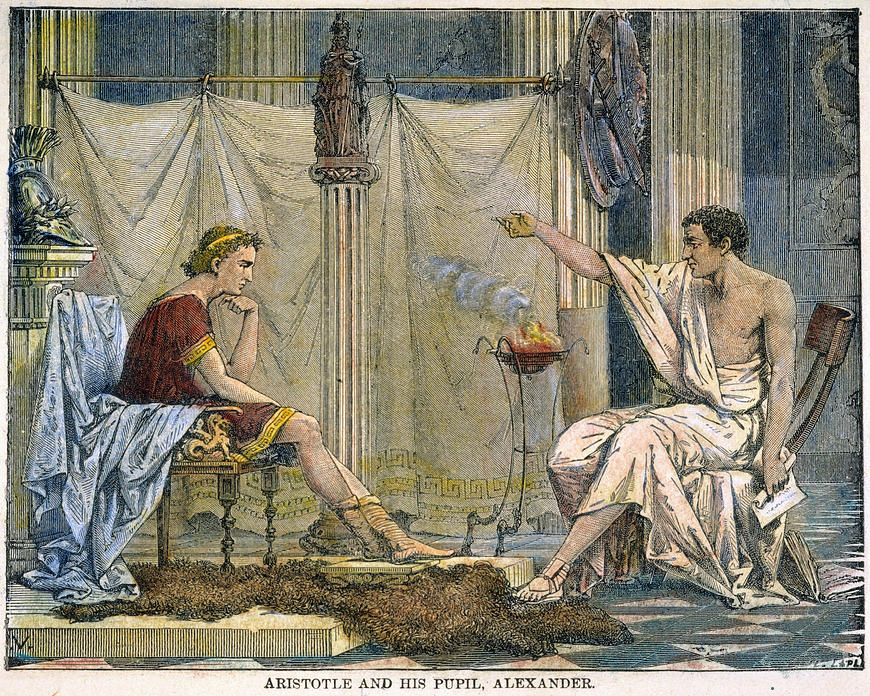
By Charles Laplante "That most enduring of romantic images, Aristotle tutoring the future conqueror Alexander". 1866

=== Sculptures ===
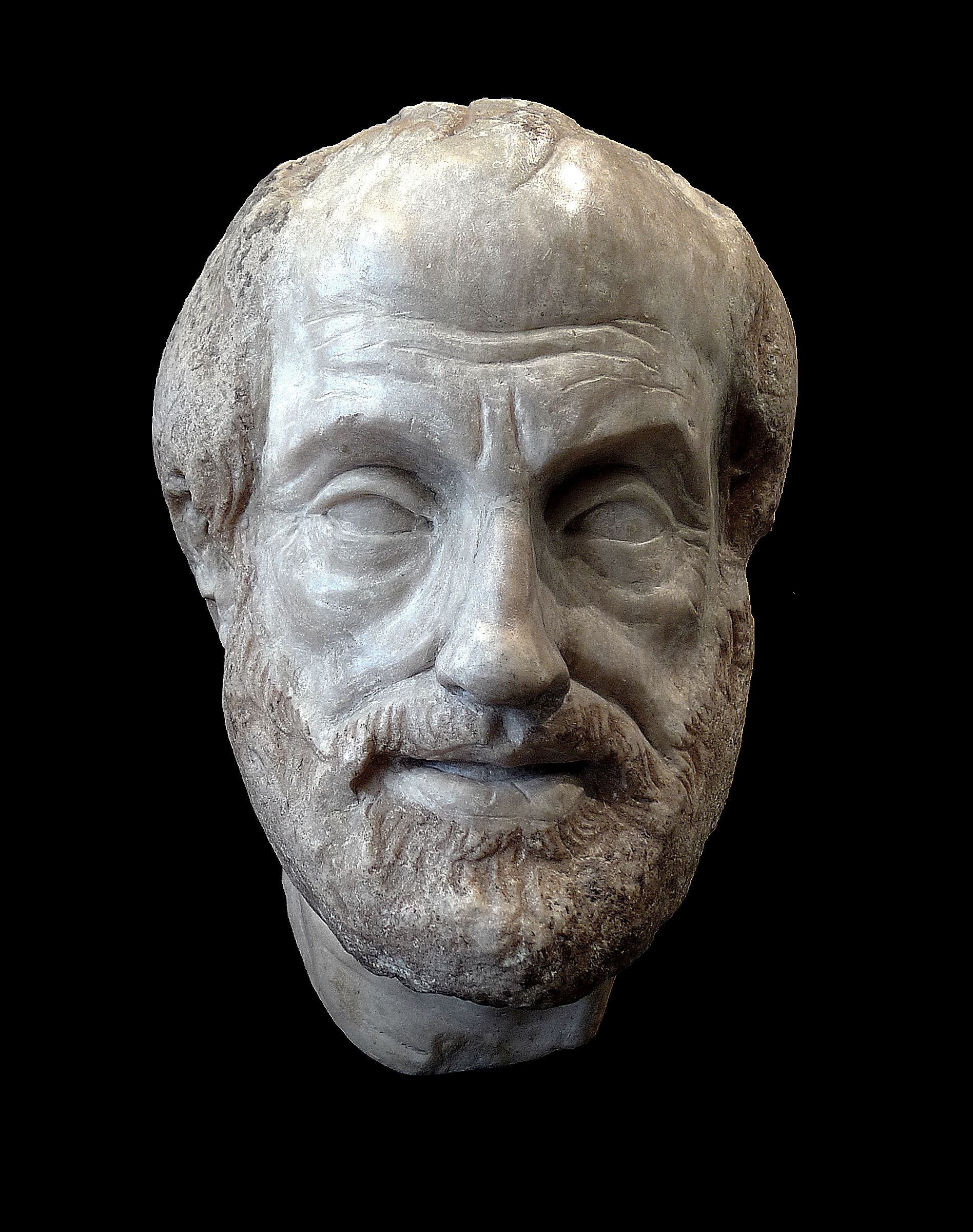
Roman copy of 1st or 2nd century from original bronze by Lysippos. Louvre Museum

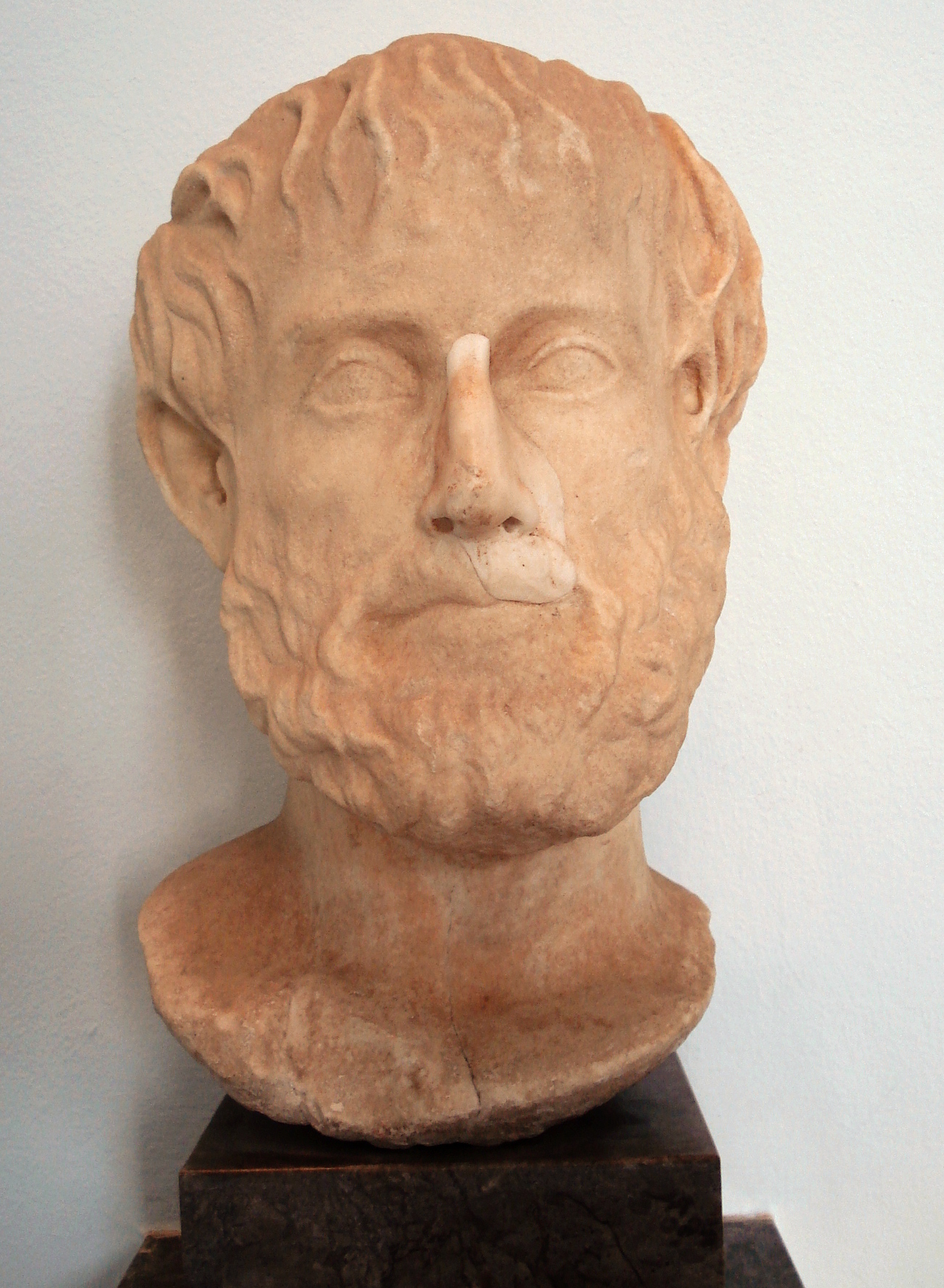
Roman copy of 117–138 AD of Greek original. Palermo Regional Archeology Museum

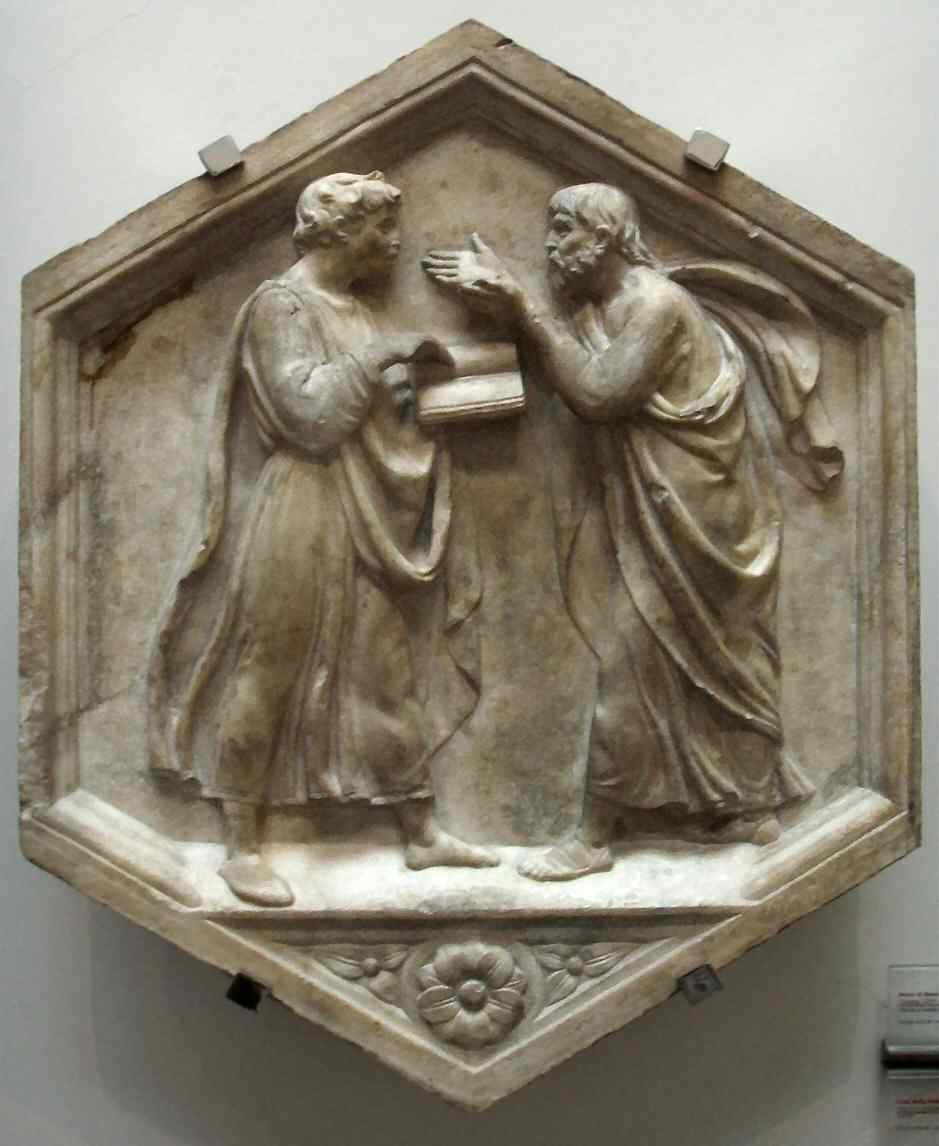
Relief of Aristotle and Plato by Luca della Robbia, Florence Cathedral, 1437–1439

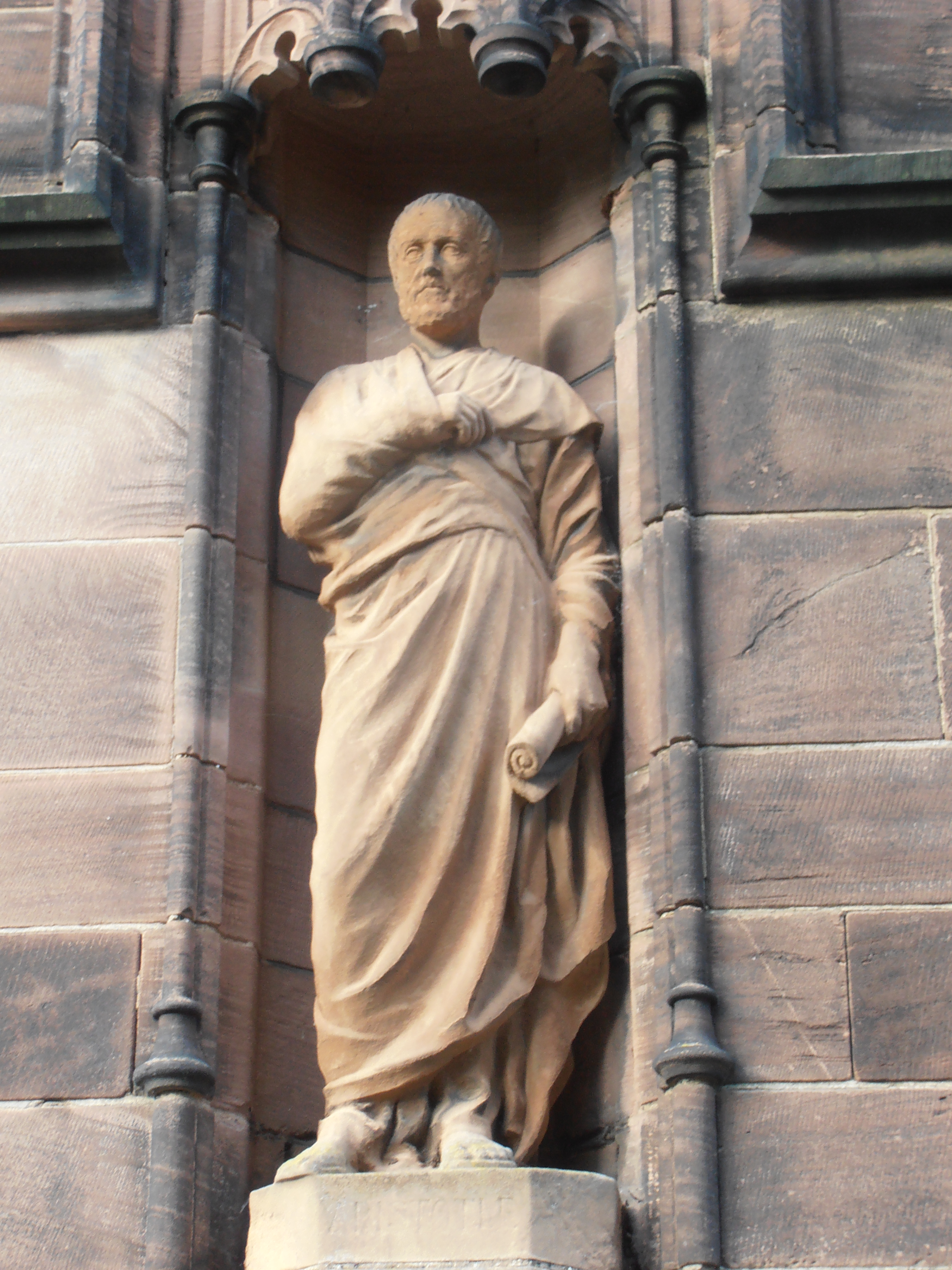
Stone statue in niche, Gladstone's Library, Hawarden, Wales, 1899

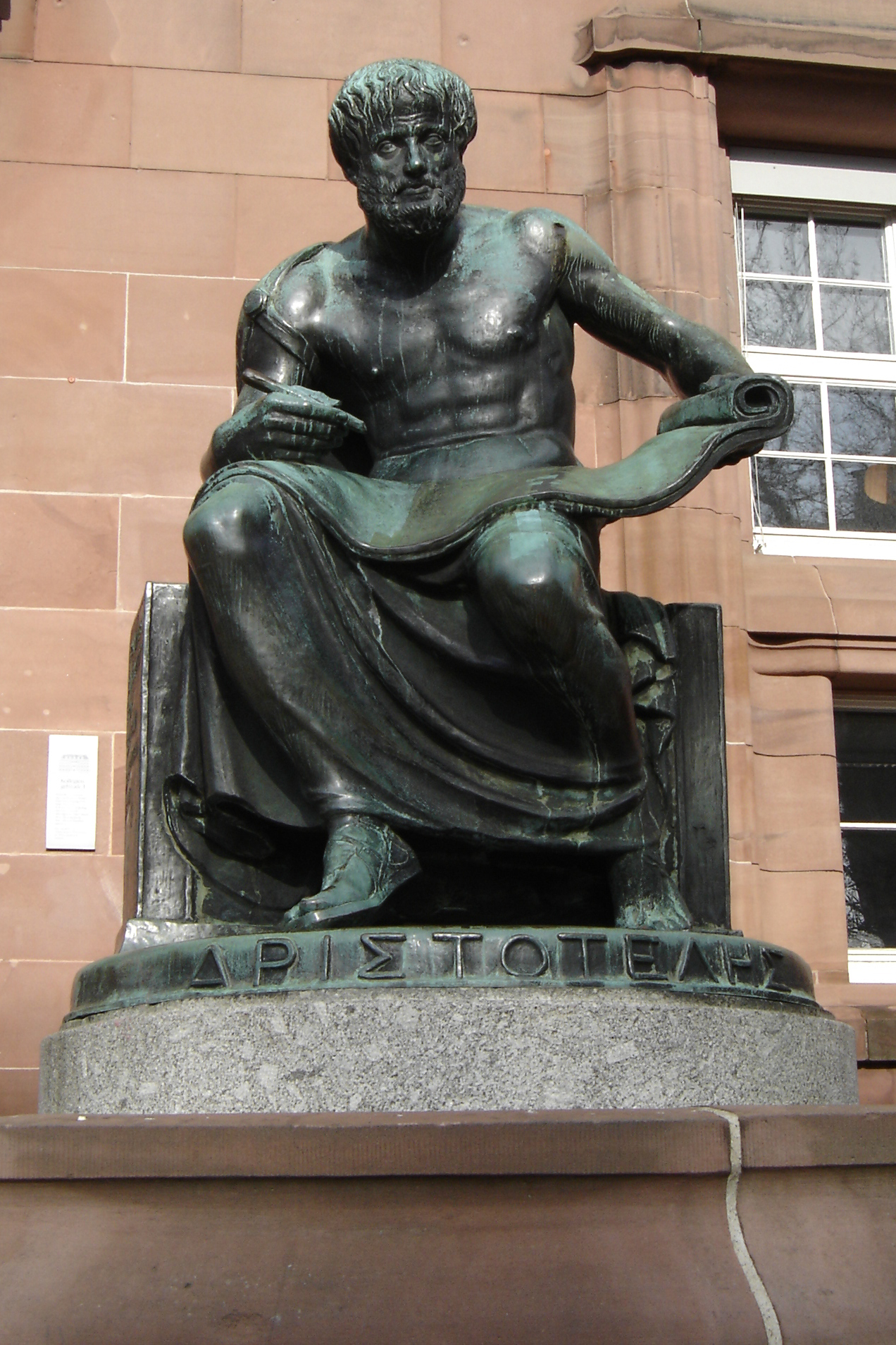
Bronze statue, University of Freiburg, Germany, 1915

== Eponyms ==
The Aristotle Mountains in Antarctica are named after Aristotle. He was the first person known to conjecture, in his book Meteorology, the existence of a landmass in the southern high-latitude region, which he called Antarctica. Aristoteles is a crater on the Moon bearing the classical form of Aristotle's name. (6123) Aristoteles, an asteroid in the main asteroid belt, also bears the classical form of his name.

== See also ==
- Aristotelian Society
- Conimbricenses
- Perfectionism

== Bibliography ==
- Damascius' Problems and Solutions Concerning First Principles (in English and Ancient Greek). Translated by Ahbel-Rappe, Sara. New York: Oxford University Press, Inc. 2010. ISBN 978-0-19-515029-2.
- Aesop (1998). The Complete Fables By Aesop. Translated by Temple, Olivia; Temple, Robert. Penguin Classics. ISBN 978-0-14-044649-4.
- Aird, W. C. (2011). "Discovery of the cardiovascular system: from Galen to William Harvey". Journal of Thrombosis and Haemostasis. 9: 118–129. doi:10.1111/j.1538-7836.2011.04312.x. PMID 21781247. S2CID 12092592.
- Allain, Rhett (21 March 2016). "I'm So Totally Over Newton's Laws of Motion". Wired.
- Anagnostopoulos, Georgios (2013). A Companion to Aristotle. Wiley. ISBN 978-1-118-59243-4.
- Aquinas, Thomas (2013). Summa Theologica. e-artnow. ISBN 978-80-7484-292-4.
- Aristoteles (31 January 2019) [1831]. Bekker, Immanuel (ed.). "Aristotelis Opera edidit Academia Regia Borussica Aristoteles graece". apud Georgium Reimerum – via Internet Archive.
- "Aristoteles". Gazetteer of Planetary Nomenclature. United States Geological Survey.
- "Aristoteles-Park in Stagira". Dimos Aristoteli. Archived from the original on 10 August 2022.
- "Aristotle (Greek philosopher)". Encyclopædia Britannica. Britannica Online Encyclopedia. Archived from the original on 22 April 2009.
- Aristotle. "Metaphysics". classics.mit.edu. The Internet Classics Archive.
- Aristotle. "Meteorology". classics.mit.edu. The Internet Classics Archive.
- Aristotle. "Nicomachean Ethics". classics.mit.edu. The Internet Classics Archive.
- Aristotle. "On the Soul". classics.mit.edu. The Internet Classics Archive.
- Aristotle. "Physics". classics.mit.edu. The Internet Classics Archive.
- Aristotle. "Poetics". classics.mit.edu. The Internet Classics Archive.
- Aristotle. "Politics". classics.mit.edu. The Internet Classics Archive.
- Aristotle. "Prior Analytics". classics.mit.edu. The Internet Classics Archive.
- Aristotle. "Rhetoric". Translated by Roberts, W. Rhys. Archived from the original on 13 February 2015.
- "Aristotle Mountains". SCAR Composite Antarctic Gazetteer. Programma Nazionale di Ricerche in Antartide. Department of the Environment and Energy, Australian Antarctic Division, Australian Government.
- Aristotle (1948). Monroe, Arthur E. (ed.). Politics-Ethics, In Early Economic Thought: Selections from Economic Literature Prior to Adam Smith. Harvard University Press.
- Aristotle (1984). Lord, Carnes (ed.). The Politics. University of Chicago Press. ISBN 978-0-226-92184-6.
- Aristotle (2009) [1995]. Politics. Translated by Ernest Barker and revised with introduction and notes by R. F. Stalley (1st ed.). Oxford University Press. ISBN 978-0-19-953873-7.
- Aristotle (1999). Aristotle's Metaphysics. Translated by Sachs, Joe. Green Lion Press.
- "Aristotle definition and meaning". www.collinsdictionary.com. Collins English Dictionary.
- "Aristotle with a Bust of Homer, Rembrandt (1653)". The Guardian. 27 July 2002.
- Averroes (1953). Crawford, F. Stuart (ed.). Commentarium Magnum in Aristotelis De Anima Libros. Mediaeval Academy of America. OCLC 611422373.
- Barnes, Jonathan (1982). Aristotle: A Very Short Introduction. Oxford University Press. ISBN 978-0-19-285408-7.
- Barnes, Jonathan (1995). "Life and Work". The Cambridge Companion to Aristotle. Cambridge University Press. ISBN 978-0-521-42294-9.
- Barnes, Jonathan; Griffin, Miriam Tamara (1999). Philosophia Togata: Plato and Aristotle at Rome. II. Clarendon Press. ISBN 978-0-19-815222-4.
- Bergstrom, Carl T.; Dugatkin, Lee Alan (2012). Evolution. Norton. ISBN 978-0-393-92592-0.
- Blits, Kathleen C. (15 April 1999). "Aristotle: Form, function, and comparative anatomy". The Anatomical Record. 257 (2): 58–63. doi:10.1002/(SICI)1097-0185(19990415)257:2<58::AID-AR6>3.0.CO;2-I. PMID 10321433.
- Bloch, David (2007). Aristotle on Memory and Recollection. Brill. ISBN 978-90-04-16046-0.
- Bobzien, Susanne (2015). "Ancient Logic". In Zalta, Edward N. (ed.). The Stanford Encyclopedia of Philosophy. Metaphysics Research Lab, Stanford University – via Stanford Encyclopedia of Philosophy.
- Boole, George (2003) [1854]. The Laws of Thought. Prometheus Books. ISBN 978-1-59102-089-9.
- Carruthers, Mary (2007). The Book of Memory: A Study of Memory in Medieval Culture. Cambridge University Press. ISBN 978-0-521-42973-3.
- Carteron, Henri (1923). Notion de Force dans le Systeme d'Aristote (in French). J. Vrin.
- Cicero, Marcus Tullius (1874). "Book II, chapter XXXVIII, § 119". In Reid, James S. (ed.). The Academica of Cicero 106–43 BC. Macmillan.
- Cohen, S. Marc (8 October 2000). "Aristotle's Metaphysics". Stanford Encyclopedia of Philosophy (Winter 2016 ed.).
- Corcoran, John (2009). "Aristotle's Demonstrative Logic". History and Philosophy of Logic. 30: 1–20. doi:10.1080/01445340802228362. S2CID 8514675.
- Darwin, Charles (1872). The Origin of Species by Means of Natural Selection, or the Preservation of Favoured Races in the Struggle for Life (6th ed.). London: John Murray.
- Day, J. (2013). "Botany meets archaeology: people and plants in the past". Journal of Experimental Botany. 64 (18): 5805–5816. doi:10.1093/jxb/ert068. PMID 23669575.
- Degnan, Michael (1994). "Recent Work in Aristotle's Logic". Philosophical Books. 35 (2 (April 1994)): 81–89. doi:10.1111/j.1468-0149.1994.tb02858.x.
- Dijksterhuis, Eduard Jan (1969). The Mechanization of the World Picture. Translated by C. Dikshoorn. Princeton University Press.
- Drabkin, Israel E. (1938). "Notes on the Laws of Motion in Aristotle". The American Journal of Philology. 59 (1): 60–84. doi:10.2307/290584. JSTOR 90584.
- Durant, Will (2006) [1926]. The Story of Philosophy. Simon & Schuster. ISBN 978-0-671-73916-4.
- Düring, Ingemar (1957). Aristotle in the Ancient Biographical Tradition. By Ingemar Düring. Almqvist & Wiksell in Komm.
- Ebenstein, Alan; Ebenstein, William (2002). Introduction to Political Thinkers. Wadsworth Group.
- Evans, Nancy (2006). "Diotima and Demeter as Mystagogues in Plato's Symposium". Hypatia. 21 (2): 1–27. doi:10.1111/j.1527-2001.2006.tb01091.x. ISSN 1527-2001. S2CID 143750010.
- Falcon, Andrea (2021). "Commentators on Aristotle". In Zalta, Edward N. (ed.). Stanford Encyclopedia of Philosophy. ISSN 1095-5054. OCLC 429049174.
- Filonik, Jakub (2013). "Athenian impiety trials: a reappraisal". Dike. 16 (16): 72–73. doi:10.13130/1128-8221/4290.
- Garver, Eugene (1994). Aristotle's Rhetoric: An Art of Character. University of Chicago Press. ISBN 978-0-226-28425-5.
- Gigon, Olof (2017) [1965]. Vita Aristotelis Marciana. Walter de Gruyter. ISBN 978-3-11-082017-1.
- Green, Peter (1991). Alexander of Macedon. University of California Press. ISBN 978-0-520-27586-7.
- Grimaldi, William M. A. (1998). "Studies in the Philosophy of Aristotle's Rhetoric". In Enos, Richard Leo; Agnew, Lois Peters (eds.). Landmark Essays on Aristotelian Rhetoric. Vol. 14. Lawrence Erlbaum Associates. p. 71. ISBN 978-1-880393-32-1.
- Guthrie, W. (2010). A History of Greek Philosophy Vol. 1. Cambridge University Press. ISBN 978-0-521-29420-1.
- Haase, Wolfgang (1992). Philosophie, Wissenschaften, Technik. Philosophie (Doxographica [Forts. ]) (in German). Walter de Gruyter. ISBN 978-3-11-013699-9.
- Hall, Edith (2018). Aristotle's Way: How Ancient Wisdom Can Change Your Life. The Bodley Head. ISBN 978-1-84792-407-0.
- Halliwell, Stephen (2002). "Inside and Outside the Work of Art". The Aesthetics of Mimesis: Ancient Texts and Modern Problems. Princeton University Press. pp. 152–59. ISBN 978-0-691-09258-4.
- Hankinson, R. J. (1998). Cause and Explanation in Ancient Greek Thought. Oxford University Press. doi:10.1093/0199246564.001.0001. ISBN 978-0-19-823745-7.
- Hasse, Dag Nikolaus (2014). "Influence of Arabic and Islamic Philosophy on the Latin West". In Zalta, Edward N. (ed.). Stanford Encyclopedia of Philosophy. ISSN 1095-5054. OCLC 429049174.
- Hazel, John (2013) [1999]. Who's Who in the Greek World. Taylor & Francis. ISBN 978-1-134-80223-4.
- Held, Julius (1969). Rembrandt's Aristotle and Other Rembrandt Studies. Princeton University Press. ISBN 978-0-691-03862-9.
- Hladký, V.; Havlíček, J. (2013). "Was Tinbergen an Aristotelian? Comparison of Tinbergen's Four Whys and Aristotle's Four Causes" (PDF). Human Ethology Bulletin. 28 (4): 3–11.
- Holowchak, Mark (1996). "Aristotle on Dreaming: What Goes on in Sleep when the 'Big Fire' goes out". Ancient Philosophy. 16 (2): 405–423. doi:10.5840/ancientphil199616244.
- Hooker, William Jackson (1831). The British Flora: Comprising the Phaenogamous, Or Flowering Plants, and the Ferns. Longman. OCLC 17317293.
- House, Humphry (1956). Aristotle's Poetics. Rupert Hart-Davis.
- Hornblower, Simon (2002). The Greek World, 479–323 BC. Routledge. ISBN 0-415-16326-9.
- Humphreys, Justin (2009). "Aristotle (384–322 B.C.E.)". In Fieser, James; Dowden, Bradley (eds.). Internet Encyclopedia of Philosophy. ISSN 2161-0002. OCLC 37741658.
- Hutchinson, D. S.; Johnson, Monte Ransome (2015). "Exhortation to Philosophy" (PDF). Protrepticus. p. 22.
- Ierodiakonou, Katerina (2008). "Byzantine Philosophy". In Zalta, Edward N. (ed.). Stanford Encyclopedia of Philosophy. ISSN 1095-5054. OCLC 429049174.
- Irwin, Terence; Fine, Gail, eds. (1996). Aristotle: Introductory Readings. Hackett Pub. ISBN 978-0-87220-339-6.
- Jones, Jonathan (27 July 2002). "Aristotle with a Bust of Homer, Rembrandt (1653)". The Guardian.
- Jones, W. T. (1980). The Classical Mind: A History of Western Philosophy. Harcourt Brace Jovanovich. ISBN 978-0-15-538312-8.
- Kant, Immanuel (1787). Critique of Pure Reason (Second ed.). OCLC 2323615.
- Kaufmann, Walter Arnold (1968). Tragedy and Philosophy. Princeton University Press. ISBN 978-0-691-02005-1.
- Kennedy-Day, Kiki (1998). "Aristotelianism in Islamic philosophy". Routledge Encyclopedia of Philosophy. Taylor and Francis. doi:10.4324/9780415249126-H002-1. ISBN 978-0-415-25069-6.
- Kraut, Richard (1 May 2001). "Aristotle's Ethics". Stanford Encyclopedia of Philosophy.
- Kuhn, Heinrich (2018). "Aristotelianism in the Renaissance". In Zalta, Edward N. (ed.). Stanford Encyclopedia of Philosophy. ISSN 1095-5054. OCLC 429049174.
- Kukkonen, Taneli (2010). Grafton, Anthony; et al. (eds.). The classical tradition. Belknap Press of Harvard University Press. ISBN 978-0-674-03572-0.
- Lagerlund, Henrik (2016). "Medieval Theories of the Syllogism". In Zalta, Edward N. (ed.). Stanford Encyclopedia of Philosophy. ISSN 1095-5054. OCLC 429049174.
- Lee, Ellen Wardwell; Robinson, Anne (2005). Indianapolis Museum of Art: Highlights of the Collection. Indianapolis Museum of Art. ISBN 978-0-936260-77-8.
- Leroi, Armand Marie (3 May 2011). "Aristotle's Lagoon: Embryo Inside a Chicken's Egg". BBC.
- Leroi, Armand Marie (2015). The Lagoon: How Aristotle Invented Science. Bloomsbury. ISBN 978-1-4088-3622-4.
- Lindberg, David (1992). The Beginnings of Western Science. University of Chicago Press. ISBN 978-0-226-48205-7.
- Lloyd, G. E. R. (1968). "Aristotle: The Growth and Structure of His Thought". The critic of Plato. Cambridge University Press. ISBN 978-0-521-09456-6.
- Lloyd, G. E. R. (1996). "Adversaries and Authorities: Investigations into ancient Greek and Chinese science". Causes and Correlations. Cambridge University Press. ISBN 978-0-521-55695-8.
- Lloyd, E. R. G.; Brunschwig, Jacques; Pellegrin, Pierre (2000). Greek Thought, A Guide to Classical Knowledge. Harvard University Press. ISBN 978-0-674-00261-6.
- Lovejoy, Arthur O. (1976). The Great Chain of Being: A Study of the History of an Idea. Harvard University Press. ISBN 978-0-674-36153-9.
- "Lucas Cranach the Elder| Phyllis and Aristotle". Sotheby's. 2008.
- Lyell, Charles (1832). Principles of Geology. J. Murray, 1832. OCLC 609586345.
- MacDougall-Shackleton, Scott A. (27 July 2011). "The levels of analysis revisited". Philosophical Transactions of the Royal Society B: Biological Sciences. 366 (1574): 2076–2085. doi:10.1098/rstb.2010.0363. PMC 3130367. PMID 21690126.
- Machamer, Peter (2017). "Galileo Galilei". In Zalta, Edward N. (ed.). Stanford Encyclopedia of Philosophy. ISSN 1095-5054. OCLC 429049174.
- Magee, Bryan (2010). The Story of Philosophy. Dorling Kindersley. ISBN 978-0-241-24126-4.
- Mason, Stephen F. (1979). A History of the Sciences. Collier Books. ISBN 978-0-02-093400-4. OCLC 924760574.
- Mayr, Ernst (1982). The Growth of Biological Thought. Belknap Press. ISBN 978-0-674-36446-2.
- Mayr, Ernst (1985). The Growth of Biological Thought. Harvard University Press. ISBN 978-0-674-36446-2.
- McKeon, Richard (2001). The Basic Works of Aristotle. Modern Library. ISBN 978-0-375-75799-0.
- McLeisch, Kenneth Cole (1999). Aristotle: The Great Philosophers. Routledge. ISBN 978-0-415-92392-7.
- Medawar, Peter B.; Medawar, J. S. (1984). Aristotle to Zoos: a philosophical dictionary of biology. Oxford University Press. ISBN 978-0-19-283043-2.
- Miller, Willard M. (1973). "Aristotle on Necessity, Chance, and Spontaneity". New Scholasticism. 47 (2): 204–213. doi:10.5840/newscholas197347237.
- Modrak, Deborah (2009). "Dreams and Method in Aristotle". Skepsis: A Journal for Philosophy and Interdisciplinary Research. 20: 169–181.
- Moore, Ruth (1956). The Earth We Live On. Alfred A. Knopf. OCLC 1024467091.
- Nasr, Seyyed Hossein (1996). The Islamic Intellectual Tradition in Persia. Curzon Press. ISBN 978-0-7007-0314-2.
- Nawotka, Krzysztof (2009). Alexander the Great. Cambridge Scholars Publishing. ISBN 978-1-4438-1811-7.
- Nussbaum, Martha C.; Osborne, Catherine (2014). "Aristotle". In Hornblower, Simon; Spawforth, Antony; Eidinow, Esther (eds.). The Oxford Companion to Classical Civilization (2nd ed.). Oxford University Press. ISBN 978-0-19-954556-8.
- Ogden, Daniel (2024). The Cambridge Companion to Alexander the Great. Cambridge University Press. ISBN 978-1-108-84099-6.
- Ostwald, M.; Lynch, J. (1982). "The Growth of Schools & the Advance of Knowledge". In Lewis, D. M.; Boardman, John; Hornblower, Simon; et al. (eds.). The Cambridge Ancient History Volume 6: The Fourth Century BCE. Cambridge University Press.
- Phelan, Joseph (September 2002). "The Philosopher as Hero: Raphael's The School of Athens". ArtCyclopedia.
- Pickover, Clifford A. (2009). The Math Book: From Pythagoras to the 57th Dimension, 250 Milestones in the History of Mathematics. Sterling. ISBN 978-1-4027-5796-9.
- "Plutarch – Life of Alexander (Part 1 of 7)". penelope.uchicago.edu. Loeb Classical Library. 1919.
- "Predicate Logic" (PDF). University of Texas. Archived (PDF) from the original on 29 March 2018.
- Reeve, C. D. C.; Miller, Patrick L. (2015) [2006]. Introductory Readings in Ancient Greek and Roman Philosophy. Hackett. ISBN 978-1-62466-354-3.
- Rhodes, Frank Harold Trevor (1974). Evolution. Golden Press. ISBN 978-0-307-64360-5.
- Robbins, Lionel (2000). Medema, Steven G.; Samuels, Warren J. (eds.). A History of Economic Thought: The LSE Lectures. Princeton University Press.
- Rorty, Amélie Oksenberg (1996). "Structuring Rhetoric". In Rorty, Amélie Oksenberg (ed.). Essays on Aristotle's Rhetoric. University of California Press. ISBN 978-0-520-20227-6.
- Rovelli, Carlo (2015). "Aristotle's Physics: A Physicist's Look". Journal of the American Philosophical Association. 1 (1): 23–40. arXiv:1312.4057. doi:10.1017/apa.2014.11. S2CID 44193681.
- Russell, Bertrand (1972). A history of western philosophy. Simon and Schuster. ISBN 978-0-671-31400-2.
- Sedley, David (2007). Creationism and Its Critics in Antiquity. University of California Press. ISBN 978-0-520-25364-3.
- Shields, Christopher (2012). The Oxford Handbook of Aristotle. Oxford University Press. ISBN 978-0-19-518748-9.
- Shields, Christopher (2016). "Aristotle's Psychology". In Zalta, Edward N. (ed.). Stanford Encyclopedia of Philosophy (Winter 2016 ed.). ISSN 1095-5054. OCLC 429049174.
- Shute, Clarence (1941). The Psychology of Aristotle: An Analysis of the Living Being. Columbia University Press. OCLC 936606202.
- Smith, Robin (2017). "Aristotle's Logic". In Zalta, Edward N. (ed.). Stanford Encyclopedia of Philosophy. ISSN 1095-5054. OCLC 429049174.
- Sorabji, R. (2006). Aristotle on Memory (2nd ed.). Chicago: University of Chicago Press. p. 54. "And this is exactly why we hunt for the successor, starting in our thoughts from the present or from something else, and from something similar, or opposite, or neighbouring. By this means recollection occurs..."
- Sorabji, Richard (1990). Aristotle Transformed. Duckworth. ISBN 978-0-7156-2254-4.
- Staley, Kevin (1989). "Al-Kindi on Creation: Aristotle's Challenge to Islam". Journal of the History of Ideas. 50 (3): 355–370. doi:10.2307/2709566. JSTOR 2709566.
- Susskind, Leonard (3 October 2011). "Classical Mechanics, Lectures 2, 3". The Theoretical Minimum.
- Taylor, Henry Osborn (1922). "Chapter 3: Aristotle's Biology". Greek Biology and Medicine. Archived from the original on 27 March 2006.
- "The School of Athens by Raphael". Visual Arts Cork.
- Stewart, Jessica (2019). "The Story Behind Raphael's Masterpiece 'The School of Athens'". My Modern Met. "Plato's gesture toward the sky is thought to indicate his Theory of Forms. ... Conversely, Aristotle's hand is a visual representation of his belief that knowledge comes from experience. Empiricism, as it is known, theorizes that humans must have concrete evidence to support their ideas"
- Thompson, D'Arcy (1910). Ross, W. D.; Smith, J. A. (eds.). Historia animalium – The works of Aristotle translated into English. Clarendon Press. OCLC 39273217. Archived from the original on 9 August 2019.
- Warren, Howard C. (1921). A History of the Association of Psychology. C. Scribner's sons. ISBN 978-0-598-91975-5.
- Webb, Wilse (1990). Dreamtime and dreamwork: Decoding the language of the night. Jeremy P. Tarcher. ISBN 978-0-87477-594-5.
- "When libraries were on a roll". The Telegraph. 19 May 2001. Archived from the original on 10 January 2022.
- Wildberg (2016). "John Philoponus". In Zalta, Edward N. (ed.). Stanford Encyclopedia of Philosophy. ISSN 1095-5054. OCLC 429049174.
- Worthington, Ian (2014a) [2004]. Alexander the Great: Man and God. Routledge. ISBN 978-1-317-86644-2.
- Worthington, Ian (2014b). By the Spear: Philip II, Alexander the Great, and the Rise and Fall of the Macedonian Empire. Oxford University Press. ISBN 978-0-19-992986-3.
- Wu, Yuchen (2022). "The Relationship Between Aristotle and Alexander the Great". Proceedings of the 2021 International Conference on Public Art and Human Development (ICPAHD 2021). Proceedings of the 2021 International Conference on Public Art and Human Development ( ICPAHD 2021). Vol. 638. Paris, France: Atlantis Press. doi:10.2991/assehr.k.220110.015. ISBN 978-94-6239-523-7. ISSN 2352-5398.
- Thomas, Nigel J. T. (21 March 2018). "Aristotle's influence (Supplement to Mental imagery)". In Zalta, Edward N. (ed.). Stanford Encyclopedia of Philosophy (Spring 2018 ed.). ISSN 1095-5054. OCLC 429049174.
