= Death by burning =

Execution, murder, or suicide method

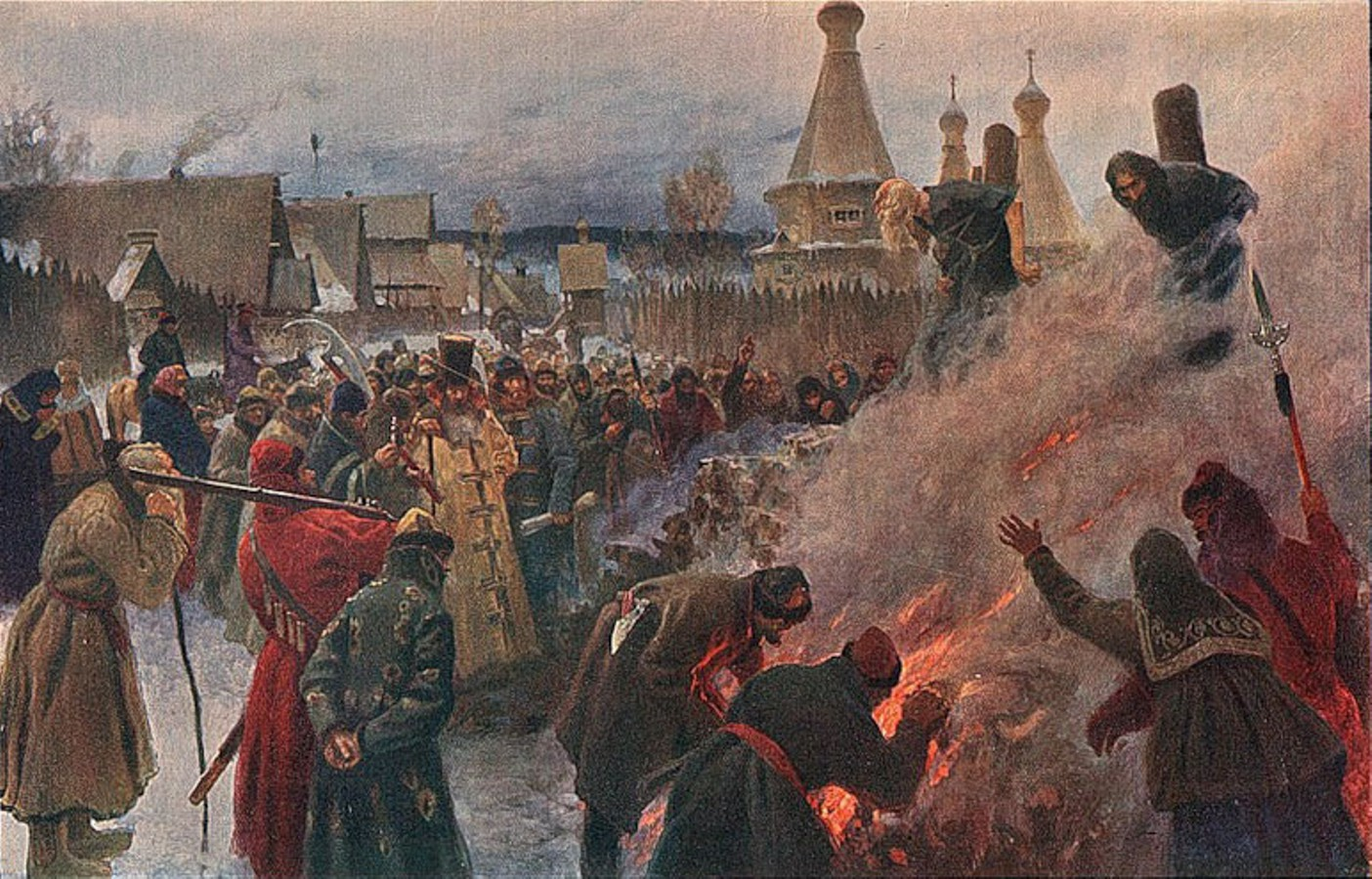
An 1892 painting showing the 1682 burning of Old Believer leader Avvakum and others in Pustozersk, Russia

Death by burning, also called immolation, is an execution, murder, or suicide method involving combustion or exposure to extreme heat. It has a long history as a form of public capital punishment, and many societies have employed it as a punishment for and warning against crimes such as treason, heresy, and witchcraft. The best-known execution of this type is burning at the stake, where the condemned is bound to a large wooden stake and a fire lit beneath.

A holocaust is a religious animal sacrifice that is completely consumed by fire, also known as a burnt offering. The word derives from the ancient Greek holokaustos, the form of sacrifice in which the victim was reduced to ash, as distinguished from an animal sacrifice that resulted in a communal meal.

There are documented executions by burning as early as the 18th century BC and as recently as 2026.

== Effects ==
In the process of being burned to death, a body experiences burns to tissue, changes in content and distribution of body fluid, fixation of tissue, and shrinkage (especially of the skin). Internal organs may be shrunken due to fluid loss. Shrinkage and contraction of the muscles may cause joints to flex and the body to adopt the "pugilistic stance" (boxer stance), with the elbows and knees flexed and the fists clenched. Shrinkage of the skin around the neck may be severe enough to strangle a victim. Fluid shifts, especially in the skull and in the hollow organs of the abdomen, can cause pseudo-hemorrhages in the form of heat hematomas. The organic matter of the body may be consumed as fuel by a fire. The cause of death is frequently determined by the respiratory tract, where edema or bleeding of mucous membranes and patchy or vesicular detachment of the mucosa may be indicative of inhalation of hot gases. Complete cremation is only achieved under extreme circumstances.

The amount of pain experienced is greatest at the beginning of the burning process before the flame burns the nerves, after which the skin does not hurt. Many victims die quickly from suffocation as hot gases damage the respiratory tract. Those who survive the burning frequently die within days as the lungs' alveoli fill with fluid and the victim dies of pulmonary edema.

== Historical use ==
=== Antiquity ===
==== Ancient Near East ====
===== Old Babylonia =====
The 18th-century BC law code promulgated by Babylonian King Hammurabi specifies several crimes in which death by burning was thought appropriate. Looters of houses on fire could be cast into the flames, and priestesses who abandoned cloisters and began frequenting inns and taverns could also be punished by being burnt alive. Furthermore, when a man committed incest with his mother after the death of his father, both mother and son could be ordered to be burned alive.

===== Ancient Egypt =====
In Ancient Egypt, several incidents of burning perceived rebels alive are attested to. Senusret I (r. 1971–1926 BC) is said to have rounded up the rebels in campaign, and burnt them as human torches. Under the civil war flaring under Takelot II more than a thousand years later, the Crown Prince Osorkon showed no mercy, and burned several rebels alive. On the statute books, at least, women committing adultery might be burned to death. Jon Manchip White, however, did not think capital judicial punishments were often carried out, pointing to the fact that the pharaoh had to personally ratify each verdict.

===== Assyria =====
In the Middle Assyrian period, paragraph 40 in a preserved law text concerns the obligatory unveiled face for the professional prostitute, and the concomitant punishment if she violated that by veiling herself (the way wives were to dress in public):

A prostitute shall not be veiled. Whoever sees a veiled prostitute shall seize her ... and bring her to the palace entrance. ... they shall pour hot pitch over her head.

For the Neo-Assyrians, mass executions seem to have been not only designed to instill terror and to enforce obedience, but also as proof of their might. Neo-Assyrian King Ashurnasirpal II (r. 883–859 BC) was evidently proud enough of his executions that he committed them to monument as follows:

I cut off their hands, I burned them with fire, a pile of the living men and of heads over against the city gate I set up, men I impaled on stakes, the city I destroyed and devastated, I turned it into mounds and ruin heaps, the young men and the maidens in the fire I burned.

===== Jewish tradition =====
In Genesis 38, Judah orders Tamar—the widow of his son, living in her father's household—to be burned when she is believed to have become pregnant via extramarital sexual relations. Tamar saves herself by proving that Judah is himself the father of her child. In the Book of Jubilees, the same story is told, with some differences. In Genesis, Judah is exercising his patriarchal power at a distance, whereas he and the relatives seem more actively involved in Tamar's impending execution.

In Hebraic law, death by burning was prescribed for ten forms of sexual crimes: the imputed crime of Tamar, namely that a married daughter of a priest commits adultery, and nine versions of relationships considered as incestuous, such as having sex with one's own daughter, or granddaughter, but also having sex with one's mother-in-law or with one's wife's daughter.

In the Mishnah, the following manner of burning the criminal is described:

The obligatory procedure for execution by burning: They immersed him in dung up to his knees, rolled a rough cloth into a soft one and wound it about his neck. One pulled it one way, one the other until he opened his mouth. Thereupon one ignites the (lead) wick and throws it in his mouth, and it descends to his bowels and sears his bowels.

That is, the person dies from being fed molten lead.

==== Ancient Rome ====
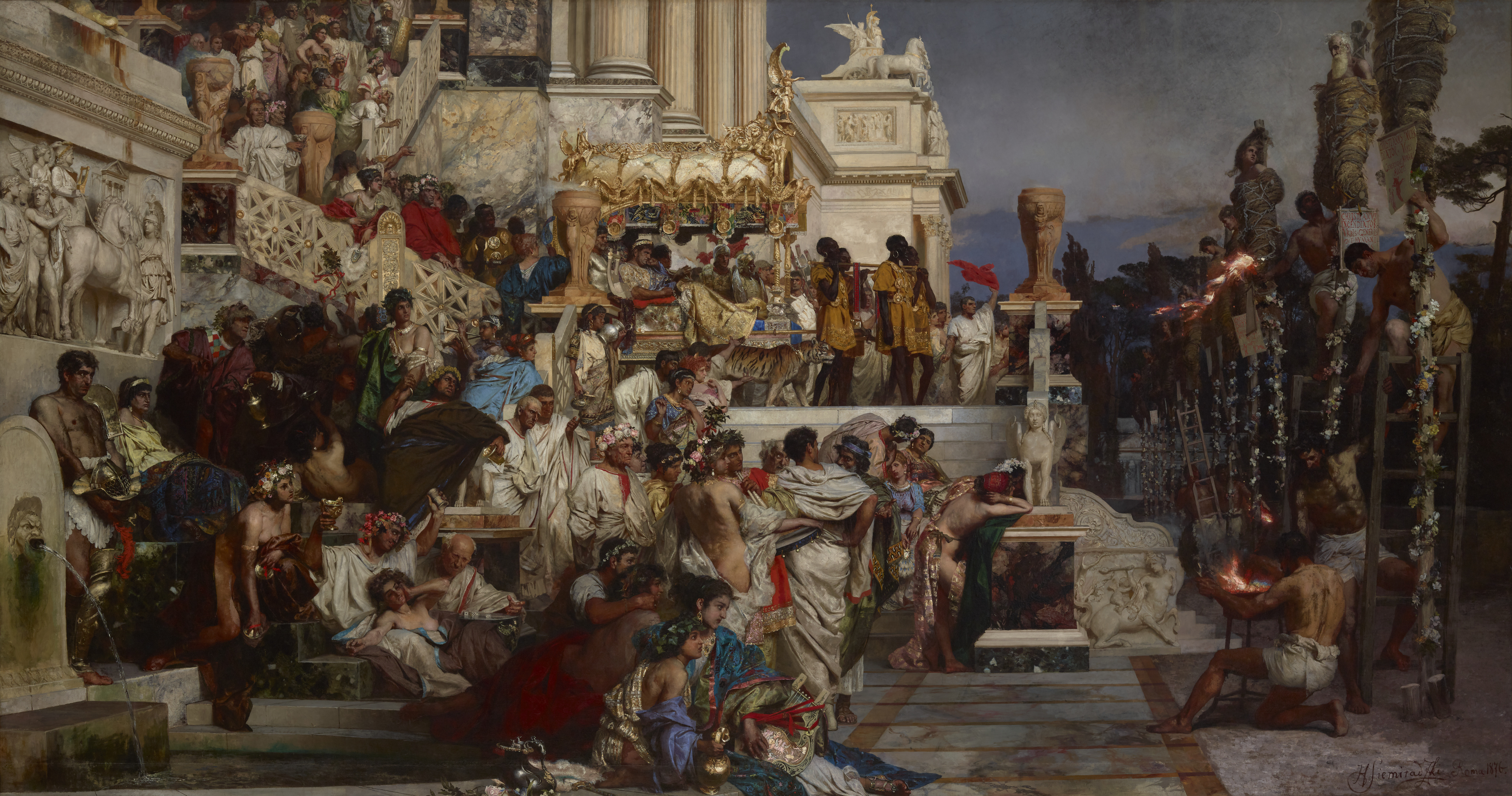
Nero's Torches

According to Christian legend, Roman authorities executed many of the early Christian martyrs by burning, including the warrior saint Theodore and Polycarp, the earliest recorded martyr. Sometimes Roman immolation was carried out using the tunica molesta, a flammable tunic:

... the Christian, stripped naked, was forced to put on a garment called the tunica molesta, made of papyrus, smeared on both sides with wax, and was then fastened to a high pole, from the top of which they continued to pour down burning pitch and lard, a spike fastened under the chin preventing the excruciated victim from turning the head to either side, so as to escape the liquid fire, until the whole body, and every part of it, was literally clad and cased in flame.

In 326, Constantine the Great promulgated a law that increased the penalties for parentally non-sanctioned "abduction" of their girls, and concomitant sexual intercourse/rape. The man would be burnt alive without the possibility of appeal, and the girl would receive the same treatment if she had participated willingly. Nurses who had corrupted their female wards and led them to sexual encounters would have molten lead poured down their throats. In the same year Constantine also passed a law that said if a woman had sexual relations with her own slave both would be subjected to capital punishment, the slave by burning. (If the slave himself reported the offense—presumably having been raped—he was to be set free.) In 390 AD, Emperor Theodosius issued an edict against male prostitutes and brothels offering such services; those found guilty should be burned alive.

In the 6th-century collection of the sayings and rulings of the pre-eminent jurists from earlier ages, the Digest, a number of crimes are regarded as punishable by death by burning. The 3rd-century jurist Ulpian said that enemies of the state and deserters to the enemy were to be burned alive. His rough contemporary, the juristical writer Callistratus, mentions that arsonists are typically burnt, as well as slaves who have conspired against the wellbeing of their masters (this last also, on occasion, being meted out to free persons of "low rank"). The punishment of burning alive arsonists (and traitors) seems to have been particularly ancient: it was included in the Twelve Tables, a mid-5th-century BC law code, that is, about 700 years prior to the times of Ulpian and Callistratus.

==== Ritual child sacrifice in Carthage ====
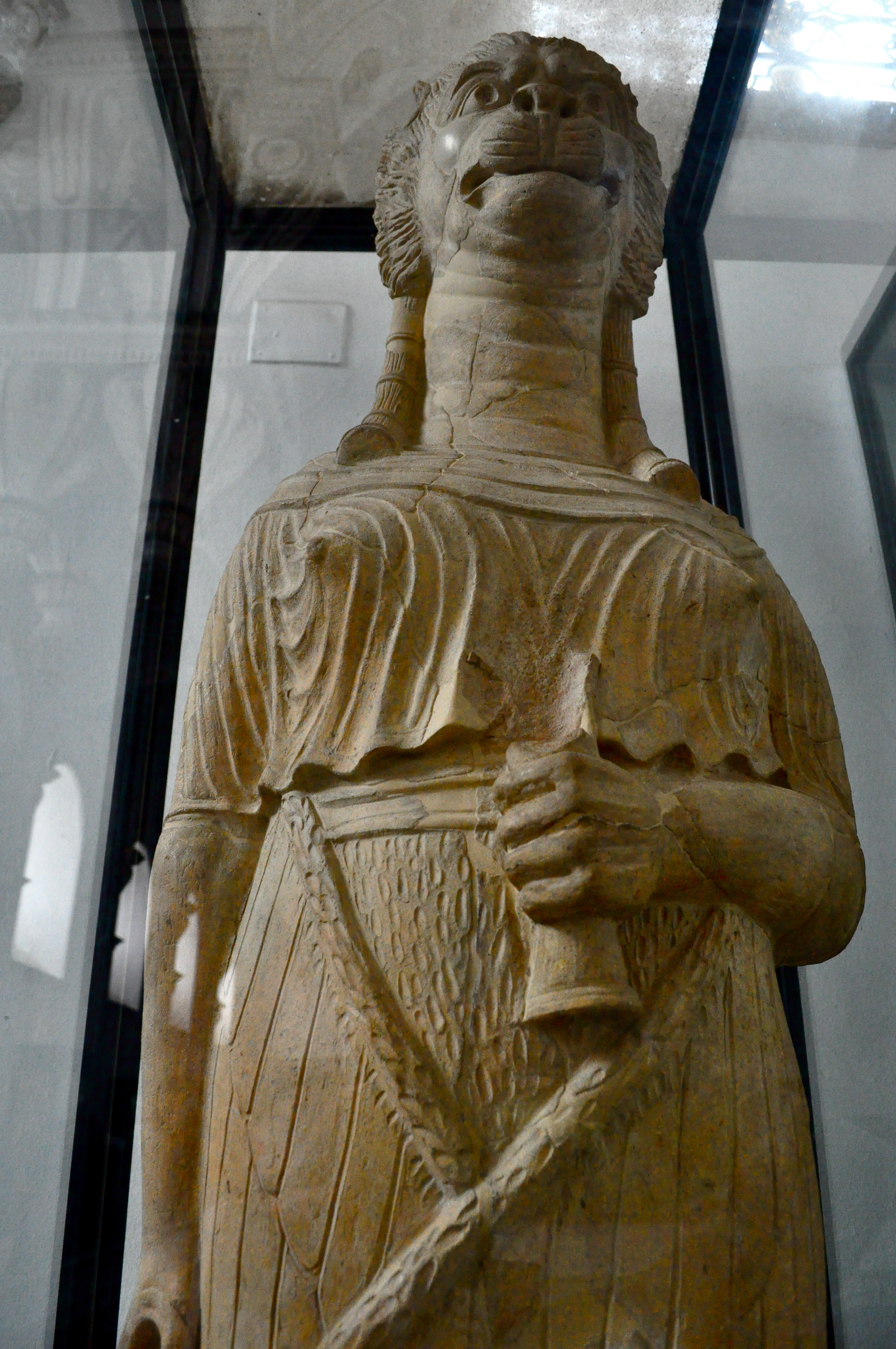
Tanit with a lion's head

Beginning in the early 3rd century BC, Greek and Roman writers commented on the purported institutionalized child sacrifice the North African Carthaginians are said to have performed in honour of the gods Baal Hammon and Tanit. The earliest writer, Cleitarchus, is among the most explicit. He says live infants were placed in the arms of a bronze statue, the statue's hands over a brazier, so that the infant slowly rolled into the fire. As it did so, the limbs of the infant contracted and the face was distorted into a sort of laughing grimace, hence called "the act of laughing". Other, later authors such as Diodorus Siculus and Plutarch say the throats of the infants were generally cut before they were placed in the statue's embrace In the vicinity of ancient Carthage, large scale graveyards containing the incinerated remains of infants, typically up to the age of 3, have been found; such graves are called "tophets". However, some scholars have argued that these findings are not evidence of systematic child sacrifice, and that estimated figures of ancient natural infant mortality (with cremation afterwards and reverent separate burial) might be the real historical basis behind the hostile reporting from non-Carthaginians. A late charge of the imputed sacrifice is found by the North African bishop Tertullian, who says that child sacrifices were still carried out, in secret, in the countryside at his time, 3rd century AD.

==== Celtic traditions ====
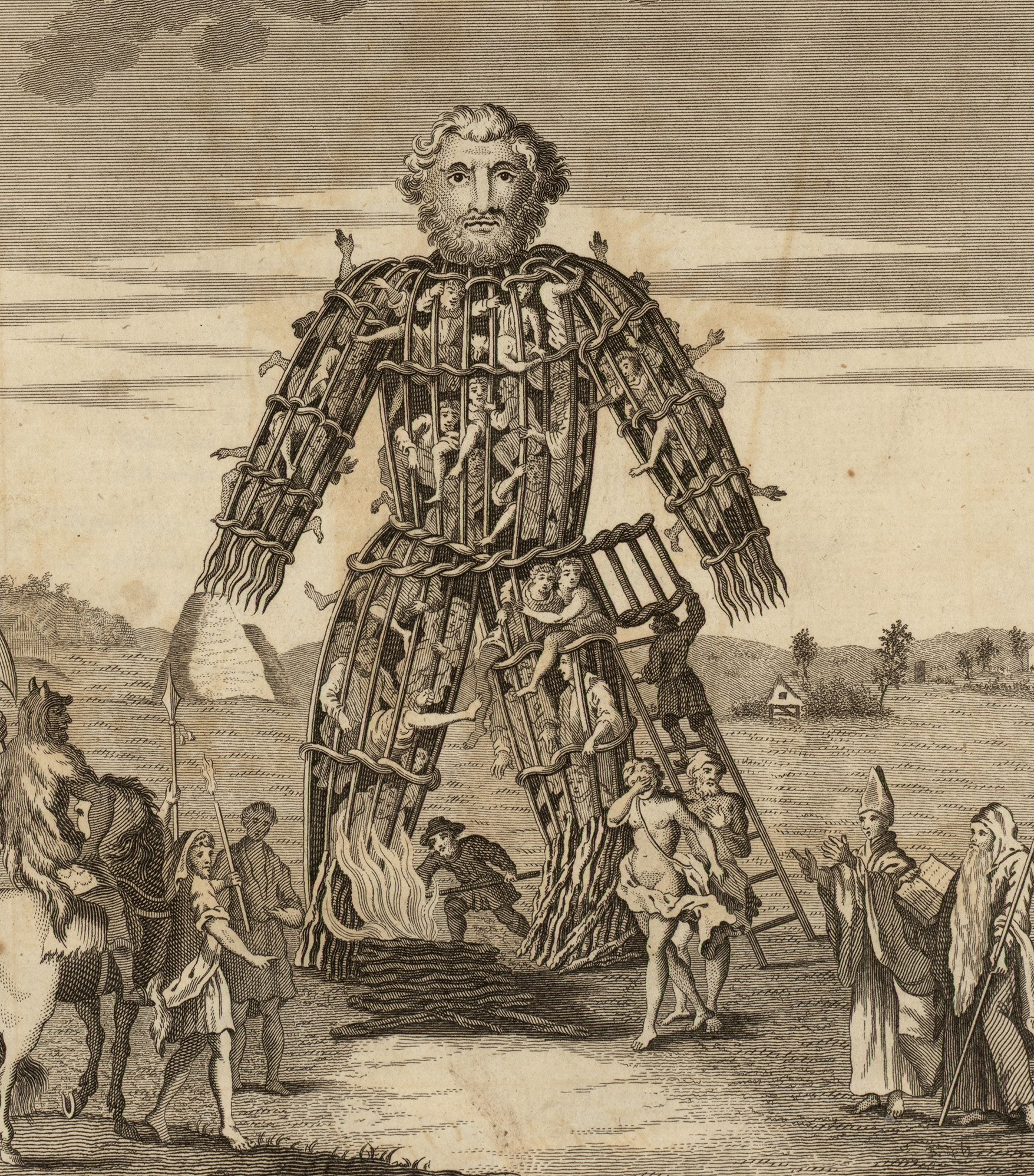
An 18th-century illustration of a wicker man. Engraving from A Tour in Wales written by Thomas Pennant

According to Julius Caesar, the ancient Celts practised the burning alive of humans in a number of settings. In Book 6, chapter 16, he writes of the Druidic sacrifice of criminals within huge wicker frames shaped as men:

Others have figures of vast size, the limbs of which formed of osiers they fill with living men, which being set on fire, the men perish enveloped in the flames. They consider that the oblation of such as have been taken in theft, or in robbery, or any other offence, is more acceptable to the immortal gods; but when a supply of that class is wanting, they have recourse to the oblation of even the innocent.

Slightly later, in Book 6, chapter 19, Caesar also says the Celts perform, on the occasion of death of great men, the funeral sacrifice on the pyre of living slaves and dependants ascertained to have been "beloved by them". Earlier on, in Book 1, chapter 4, he relates of the conspiracy of the nobleman Orgetorix, charged by the Celts for having planned a coup d'état, for which the customary penalty would be burning to death. It is said Orgetorix committed suicide to avoid that fate.

==== Baltic ====
Throughout the 12th–14th centuries, a number of non-Christian peoples living around the Eastern Baltic Sea, such as Old Prussians and Lithuanians, were charged by Christian writers with performing human sacrifice. Pope Gregory IX issued a papal bull denouncing an alleged practice among the Prussians, that girls were dressed in fresh flowers and wreaths and were then burned alive as offerings to evil spirits.

=== Christian states ===
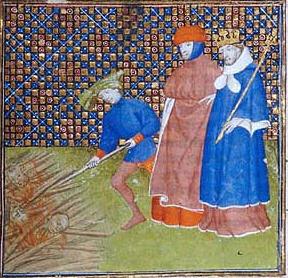
The burning of the Cathar heretics

==== Eastern Roman Empire ====
Under 6th-century Emperor Justinian I, the death penalty had been decreed for impenitent Manicheans, but a specific punishment was not made explicit. By the 7th century, however, those found guilty of "dualist heresy" could risk being burned at the stake. Those found guilty of performing magical rites, and corrupting sacred objects in the process, might face death by burning, as evidenced in a 7th-century case. In the 10th century AD, the Byzantines instituted death by burning for parricides, i.e. those who had killed their own relatives, replacing the older punishment of poena cullei, the stuffing of the convict into a leather sack, along with a rooster, a viper, a dog and a monkey, and then throwing the sack into the sea.

==== Medieval Inquisition and the burning of heretics ====
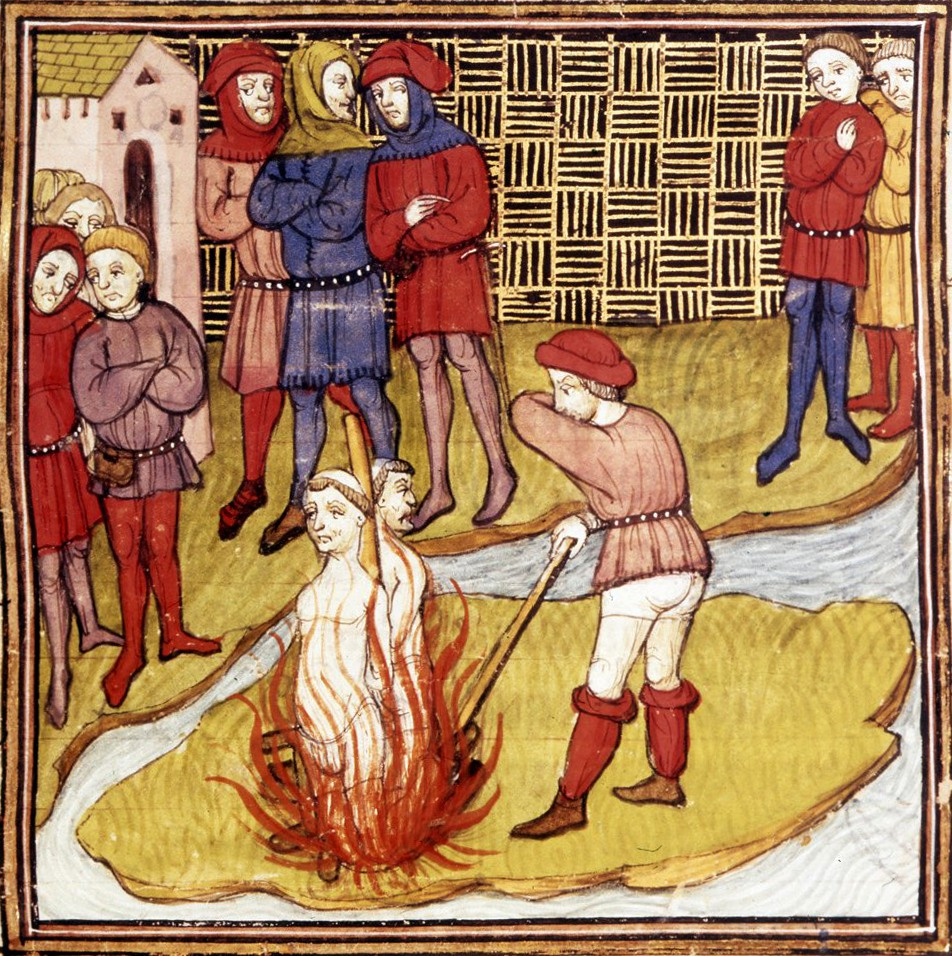
Burning of the Knights Templar, 1314

The first recorded case of heretics being burnt in Western Europe in the Middle Ages occurred in 1022 at Orléans. Civil authorities burned persons judged to be heretics under the medieval Inquisition. Burning heretics had become customary practice in the latter half of the twelfth century in continental Europe, and death by burning became statutory punishment from the early 13th century. Death by burning for heretics was made positive law by Pedro II of Aragon in 1197. In 1224, Frederick II, Holy Roman Emperor, made burning a legal alternative, and in 1238, it became the principal punishment in the Empire. In Sicily, the punishment was made law in 1231.

In England at the start of the 15th century the teachings of John Wycliffe and the Lollards began to be seen as a threat to the establishment and draconic punishments were enacted. In 1401 Parliament passed the De heretico comburendo Act, which can be loosely translated as ‘On the burning of heretics’. Lollard persecution would continue for over a hundred years in England. The Fire and Faggot Parliament met in May 1414 at Grey Friars Priory in Leicester to lay out the notorious Suppression of Heresy Act 1414, enabling the burning of heretics by making the crime enforceable by the justices of the peace. John Oldcastle, a prominent Lollard leader, was not saved from the gallows by his old friend King Henry V. Oldcastle was hanged and his gallows burned in 1417. Jan Hus was burned at the stake after being accused at the Roman Catholic Council of Constance (1414–18) of heresy. The council also decreed that the remains of John Wycliffe, dead for 30 years, should be exhumed and burned. This posthumous execution was carried out in 1428.

==== Burnings of Jews ====
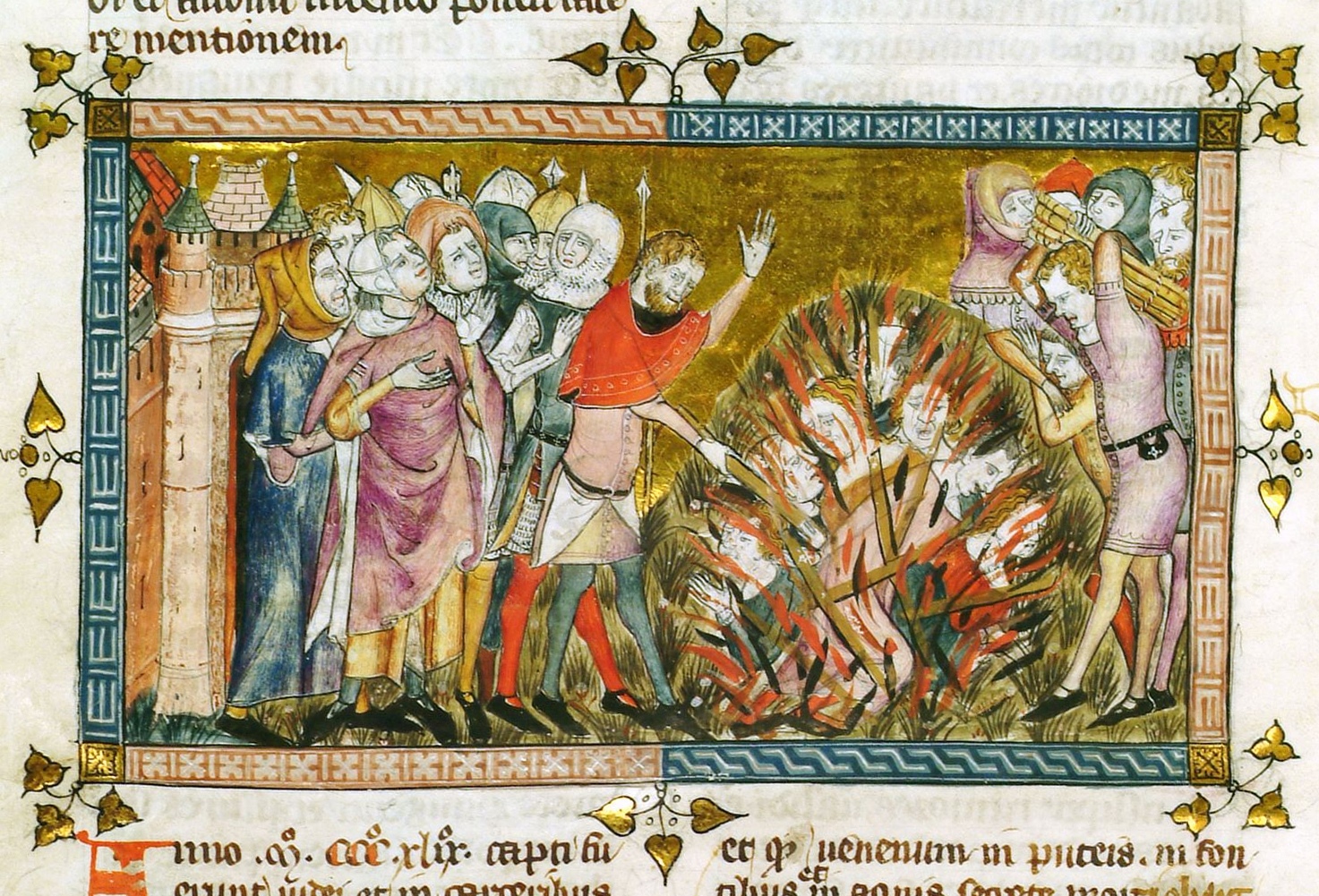
Representation of a massacre of the Jews in the 1349 Anti-Jew riots, that was justified by allegations that Jews were behind the Black Death Epidemic. Antiquitates Flandriae (Royal Library of Belgium manuscript 1376/77).

Several incidents are recorded of massacres on Jews from the 12th through 16th centuries in which they were burned alive, often on account of the blood libel. In 1171 in Blois, 51 Jews were burned alive (the entire adult community). In 1191, King Philip Augustus ordered around 100 Jews burnt alive. That Jews purportedly performed host desecration also led to mass burnings; In 1243 in Beelitz, the entire Jewish community was burnt alive, and in 1510 in Berlin, 26 Jews were burnt alive for the same crime. During the "Black Death" in the mid-14th century a spate of large-scale massacres occurred. One libel was that the Jews had poisoned the wells. In 1349, as panic grew along with the increasing death toll from the plague, general massacres, but also specifically mass burnings, began to occur. Six hundred Jews were burnt alive in Basel alone. A large mass burning occurred in Strasbourg, where several hundred Jews were burnt alive in what became known as the Strasbourg massacre.

A Jewish man, Johannes Pfefferkorn, met a particularly gruesome death in 1514 in Halle. He had been accused of having impersonated a priest for twenty years, performing host desecration, stealing Christian children to be tortured and killed by other Jews, poisoning 13 people and poisoning wells. He was lashed to a pillar in such a way that he could run about it. Then, a ring of glowing coal was made around him, and gradually pushed ever closer to him, until he was roasted to death.

==== Lepers' Plot of 1321 ====
The charge of well-poisoning was the basis for a large-scale hunt of lepers in 1321 France. In the spring of 1321, in Périgueux, people became convinced that the local lepers had poisoned the wells, causing ill-health among the normal populace. The lepers were rounded up and burned alive. The action against the lepers had repercussions throughout France, not least because King Philip V issued an order to arrest all lepers, those found guilty to be burnt alive. Jews became tangentially included as well; at Chinon alone, 160 Jews were burnt alive. All in all, around 5,000 lepers and Jews are recorded in one tradition to have been killed during the Lepers' Plot hysteria.

The charge of the lepers' plot was not wholly confined to France; extant records from England show that on Jersey the same year at least one family of lepers was burnt alive for having poisoned others.

==== Spanish Inquisition ====
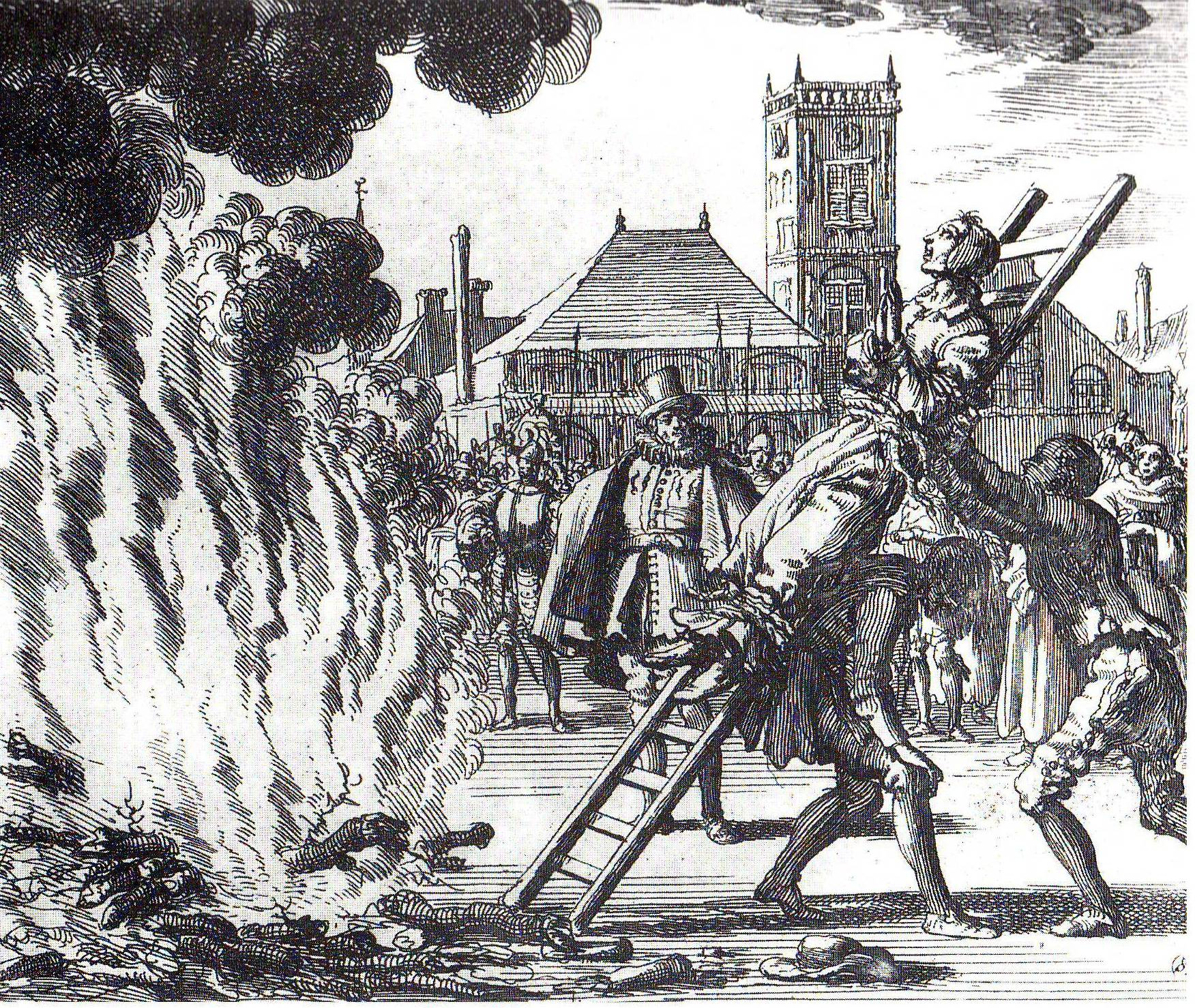
The burning of a 16th-century Dutch Anabaptist, Anneken Hendriks, who was charged with heresy

The Spanish Inquisition was established in 1478 with the aim of preserving Catholic orthodoxy: some of its principal targets were Marranos, formally converted Jews thought to have relapsed into Judaism, and Moriscos, formally converted Muslims thought to have relapsed into Islam. The public executions of the Spanish Inquisition were called autos-da-fé; convicts were "released" (handed over) to secular authorities in order to be burnt.

Estimates of how many were executed at the behest of the Spanish Inquisition were offered from early on: historian Hernando del Pulgar (1436–c. 1492) estimated that 2,000 people were burned at the stake between 1478 and 1490. Estimates ranging from 30,000 to 50,000 burnt at the stake (alive or not) at the behest of the Spanish Inquisition during its 300 years of activity have been given and are still to be found in popular books.

In February 1481, in what is said to be the first auto-da-fé, six Marranos were burnt alive in Seville. In November 1481, 298 Marranos were burnt publicly at the same place, their property confiscated by the Church. Not all Marranos executed by being burnt at the stake seem to have been burnt alive. If the Jew confessed his heresy, the Church would show mercy and he would be strangled before being burned. Autos-da-fé against Marranos extended beyond the Spanish heartland. In Sicily, from 1511 to 1515, 79 were burnt at the stake, whilst from 1511 to 1560, 441 Marranos were condemned to be burned alive. In Spanish American colonies autos-da-fé were held as well. In 1664 a man and his wife were burned alive in Río de la Plata and in 1699 a Jew was burnt alive in Mexico City.

In 1535 five Moriscos were burned at the stake on Mallorca; the images of a further four were also burnt in effigy, since the actual individuals had managed to flee. During the 1540s some 232 Moriscos were paraded in autos-da-fé in Zaragoza, five of whom were burnt at the stake. The claim that out of 917 Moriscos appearing in autos of the Inquisition in Granada between 1550 and 1595 just 20 were executed seems at odds with the English government's state papers that claim that, while at war with Spain, they received a report from Seville of 17 June 1593 that more than 70 of the richest men in Granada were burnt. As late as 1728 as many as 45 Moriscos were recorded as having been burned for heresy. In the May 1691 "bonfire of the Jews", Rafael Valls, Rafael Benito Terongi and Catalina Terongi were burned alive.

==== Portuguese Inquisition at Goa ====
In 1560, the Portuguese Inquisition opened offices in the Indian colony Goa, known as Goa Inquisition. Its aim was to protect Catholic orthodoxy among new converts to Christianity, and retain its hold on the old, particularly against "Judaizing" deviancy. From the 17th century, Europeans were shocked at the tales of how brutal and extensive the activities of the Inquisition were. Modern scholars have established that some 4,046 individuals in the time 1560–1773 received some sort of punishment from the Portuguese Inquisition, of whom 121 persons were condemned to be burned alive; 57 actually suffered that fate, while the rest escaped it, and were burnt in effigy instead. For the Portuguese Inquisition in total, not just at Goa, modern estimates of persons actually executed on its behest is about 1,200, whether burnt alive or not.

==== "Crimes against nature" ====
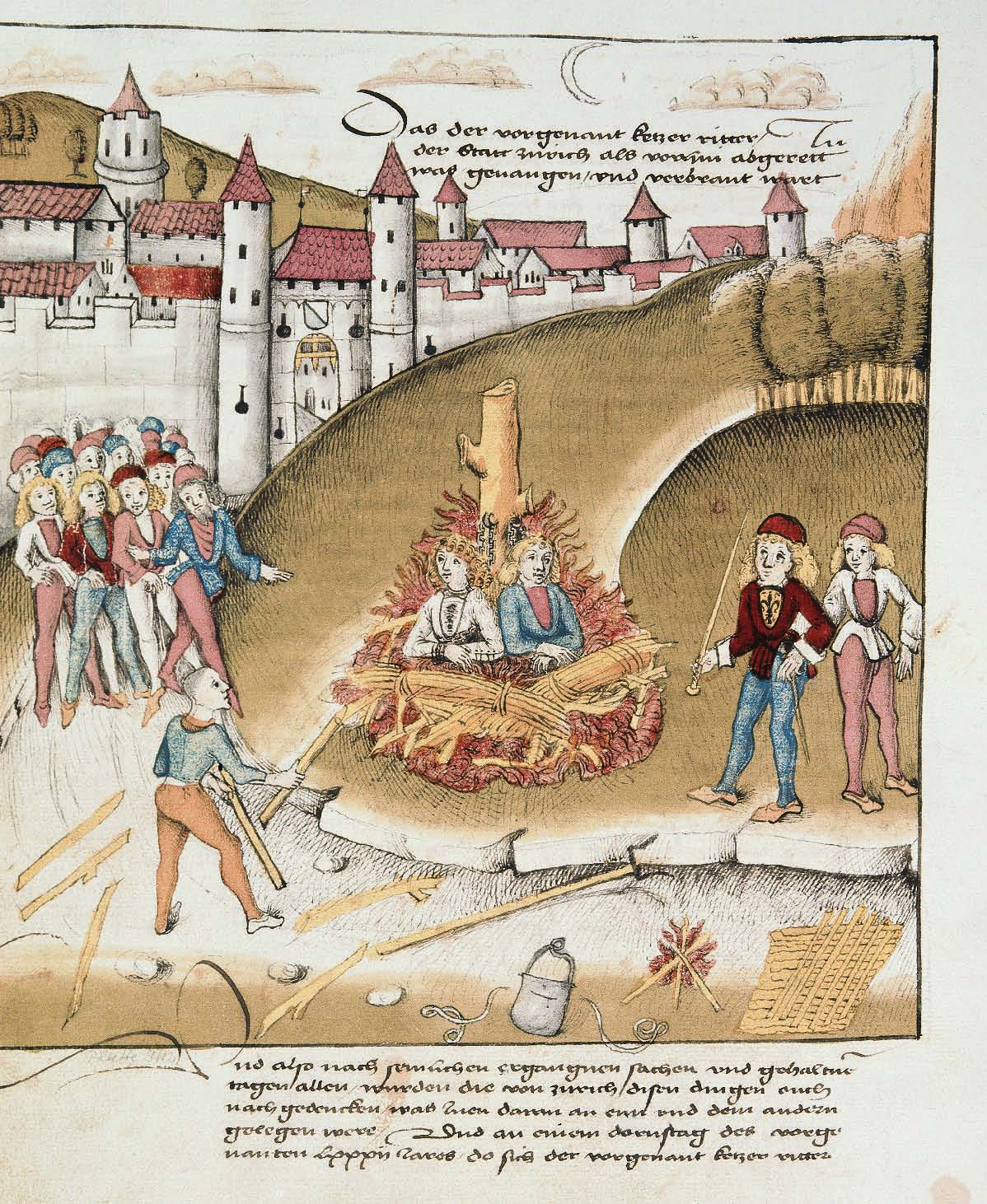
Burning of two homosexuals, Richard Puller von Hohenburg and Anton Mätzler, at the stake outside Zürich, 1482 (Spiezer Schilling)

From the 12th to the 18th centuries, various European authorities legislated (and held judicial proceedings) against sexual crimes such as sodomy and bestiality, often, the prescribed punishment being death by burning. Many scholars think that the first time death by burning appeared within explicit codes of law for the crime of sodomy was at the ecclesiastical 1120 Council of Nablus in the crusader Kingdom of Jerusalem. Here, if public repentance were done, the death penalty might be avoided. In Spain the earliest records for executions for the crime of sodomy are from the 13th to 14th centuries and it is noted there that the preferred mode of execution was death by burning. The Partidas of King Alfonso "El Sabio" condemned sodomites to be castrated and hung upside down to die from the bleeding, following the Old Testament phrase "their blood shall be upon them". In Geneva the first recorded burning of sodomites occurred in 1555, and up to 1678 some two dozen met the same fate. In Venice the first burning took place in 1492, and a monk was burnt as late as 1771. The last case in France where two men were condemned by court to be burned alive for engaging in consensual homosexual sex was in 1750 (although, it seems, they were actually strangled prior to being burned). The last case in France where a man was condemned to be burned for a murderous rape of a boy occurred in 1784.

Crackdowns and the public burning of a homosexual couple sometimes led others to flee out of fear of a similar fate. The traveller William Lithgow witnessed such a dynamic when he visited Malta in 1616 :

The fifth day of my staying here, I saw a Spanish soldier and a Maltezen boy burnt in ashes, for the public profession of sodomy; and long before night, there were above an hundred bardassoes, whorish boys, that fled away to Sicily in a galliot, for fear of fire; but never one bugeron stirred, being few or none there free of it.

In 1409 and 1532 in Augsburg two pederasts were burned alive for their offences.

==== Penal code of Charles V ====
In 1532, Holy Roman Emperor Charles V promulgated his penal code Constitutio Criminalis Carolina. A number of crimes were punishable with death by burning, such as coin forgery, arson, and sexual acts "contrary to nature". Also, those guilty of aggravated theft of sacred objects from a church could be condemned to be burnt alive. Only those found guilty of malevolent witchcraft could be punished by death by fire.

==== Witches and heretics ====
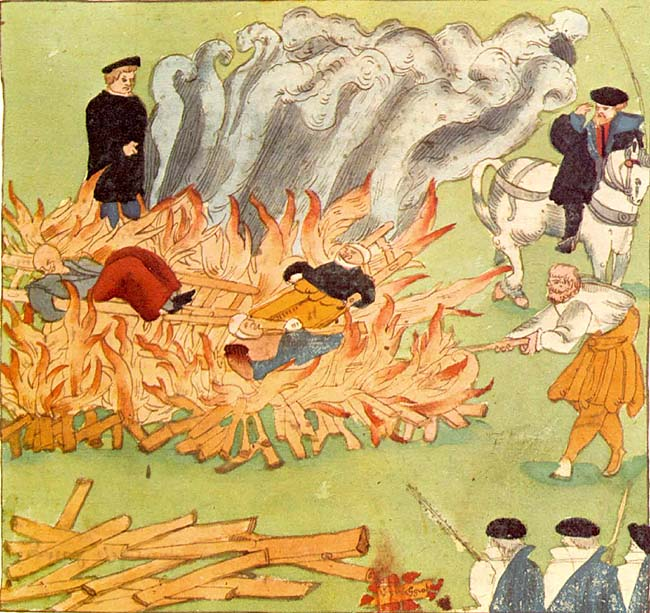
Burning of three witches in Baden (1585), from the Wickiana Collection

Burning was used during the witch-hunts of Europe, although hanging was the preferred style of execution in England and Wales. The penal code known as the Constitutio Criminalis Carolina (1532) decreed that sorcery throughout the Holy Roman Empire should be treated as a criminal offence, and if it purported to inflict injury upon any person the witch was to be burnt at the stake. In 1572, Augustus, Elector of Saxony imposed the penalty of burning for witchcraft of every kind, including simple fortunetelling. From the latter half of the 18th century, the number of "nine million witches burned in Europe" has been bandied about in popular accounts and media, but has never had a following among specialist researchers. Today, based on meticulous study of trial records, ecclesiastical and inquisitorial registers and so on, as well as on the utilization of modern statistical methods, the specialist research community on witchcraft has reached an agreement for roughly 40,000–50,000 people executed for witchcraft in Europe in total, far from all of them executed by being burned alive. Furthermore, it is solidly established that the peak period of witch-hunts was the century 1550–1650, with a slow increase preceding it, from the 15th century onward, as well as a sharp drop following it, with "witch-hunts" having basically fizzled out by the first half of the 18th century.

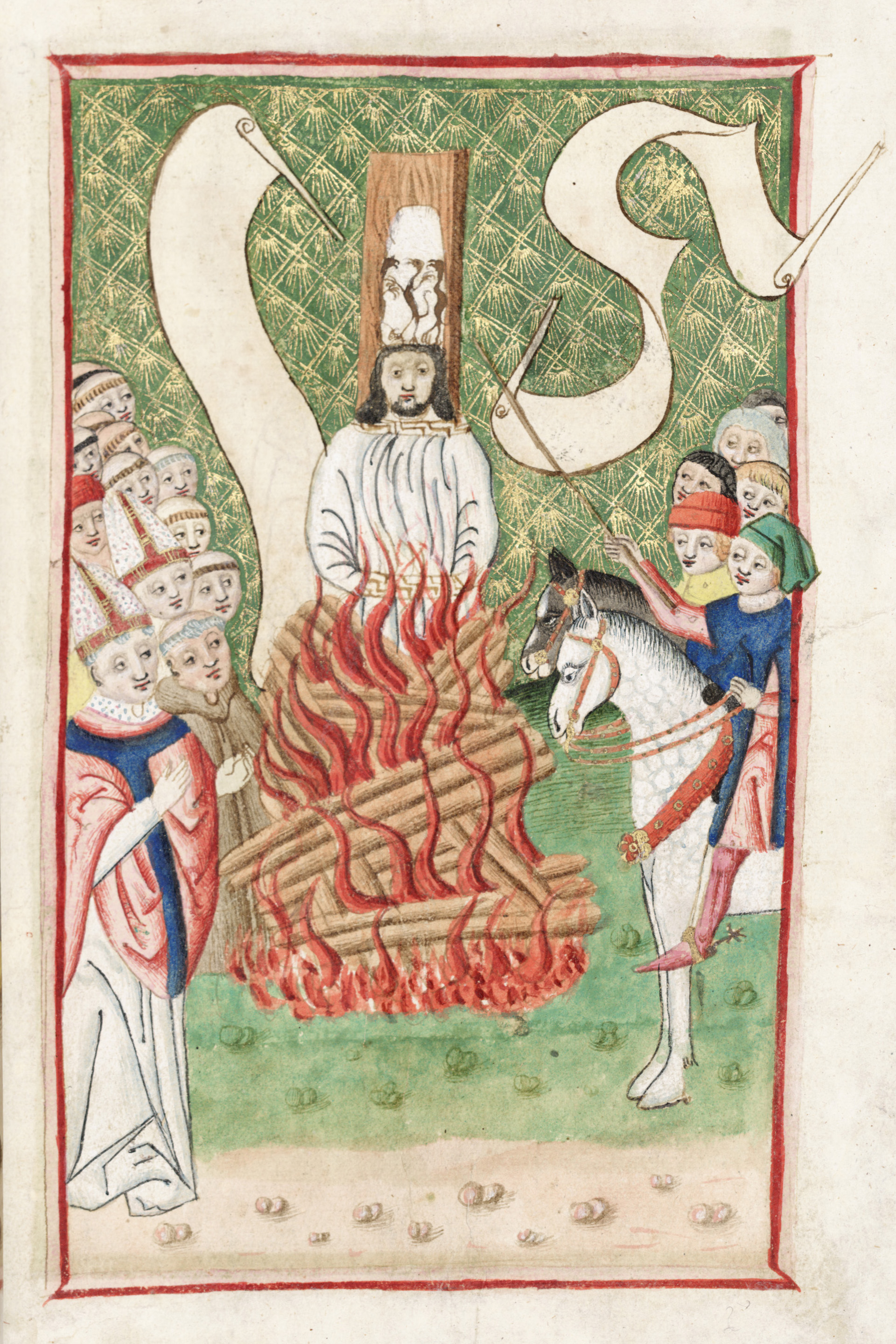
Jan Hus burnt at the stake

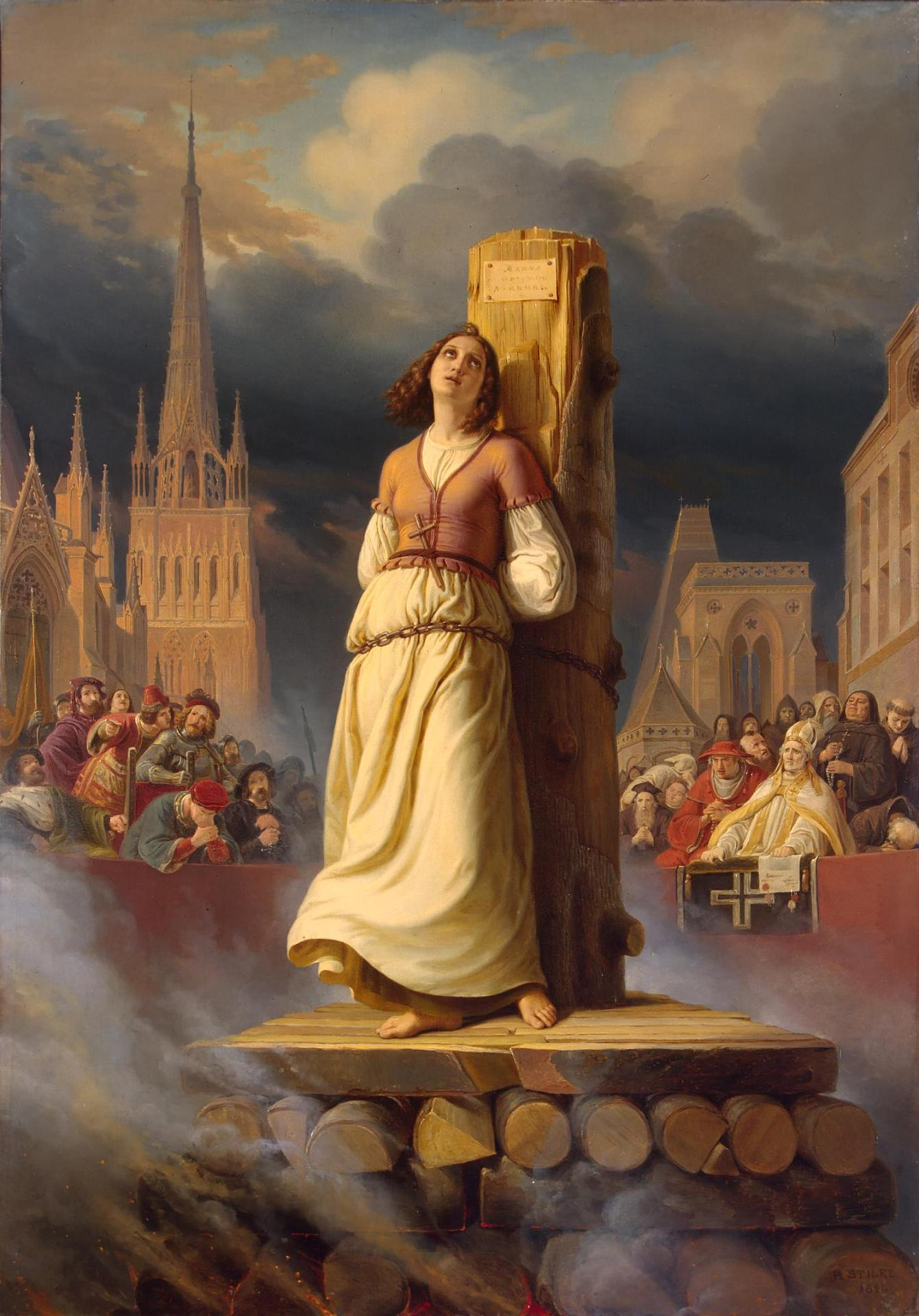
Joan of Arc's Death at the Stake, by Hermann Stilke (1843)

Notable individuals executed by burning include Jacques de Molay (1314), Jan Hus (1415), Joan of Arc (1431), Girolamo Savonarola (1498), Patrick Hamilton (1528), John Frith (1533), William Tyndale (1536), Michael Servetus (1553), Giordano Bruno (1600), Urbain Grandier (1634), and Avvakum (1682). Anglican martyrs John Rogers, Hugh Latimer and Nicholas Ridley were burned at the stake in 1555. Thomas Cranmer followed the next year (1556).

==== Denmark ====
In Denmark, after the 1536 Reformation, Christian IV of Denmark (r. 1588–1648) encouraged the practice of burning witches, in particular by the law against witchcraft in 1617. In Jutland, the mainland part of Denmark, more than half the recorded cases of witchcraft in the 16th and 17th centuries occurred after 1617. Rough estimates says about a thousand persons were executed due to convictions for witchcraft in the 1500–1600s, but it is not wholly clear if all of the transgressors were burned to death.

==== England ====
Mary I ordered hundreds of Protestants burnt at the stake during her reign (1553–1558) in what would be known as the "Marian Persecutions" earning her the epithet of "Bloody" Mary. Many of those executed by Mary are listed in Actes and Monuments, written by Foxe in 1563 and 1570.

Edward Wightman, a radical Anabaptist from Burton on Trent, who publicly denied the Trinity and the divinity of Christ was the last person burned at the stake for heresy in England in Lichfield, Staffordshire on 11 April 1612. Although cases can be found of burning heretics in the 16th and 17th centuries in England, that penalty for heretics was historically relatively new. It did not exist in 14th-century England, and when the bishops in England petitioned King Richard II to institute death by burning for heretics in 1397, he flatly refused, and no one was burnt for heresy during his reign. Just one year after his death, however, in 1401, William Sawtrey was burnt alive for heresy. Death by burning for heresy was formally abolished by Parliament during the reign of King Charles II in 1676.

The traditional punishment for women found guilty of treason was to be burned at the stake, where they did not need to be publicly displayed naked, whereas men were hanged, drawn and quartered. The jurist William Blackstone argued as follows for the different punishments for females and males:

For as the decency due to sex forbids the exposing and public mangling of their bodies, their sentence (which is to the full as terrible to sensation as the other) is to be drawn to the gallows and there be burned alive

However, as described in Camille Naish's "Death Comes to the Maiden", in practice, the woman's clothing would burn away at the beginning, and she would be left naked anyway. There were two types of treason: high treason, for crimes against the sovereign; and petty treason, for the murder of one's lawful superior, including that of a husband by his wife. Commenting on the 18th-century execution practice, Frank McLynn says that most convicts condemned to burning were not burnt alive, and that the executioners made sure the women were dead before consigning them to the flames.

The last person condemned to death for "petty treason" was Mary Bailey, whose body was burned in 1784. The last woman to be convicted for "high treason", and have her body burnt, in this case for the crime of coin forgery, was Catherine Murphy in 1789. The last case where a woman was actually burnt alive in England is that of Catherine Hayes in 1726, for the murder of her husband. In this case, one account says this happened because the executioner accidentally set fire to the pyre before he had hanged Hayes properly. The historian Rictor Norton has assembled a number of contemporary newspaper reports on the actual death of Mrs. Hayes, internally somewhat divergent. The following excerpt is one example:

The fuel being placed round her, and lighted with a torch, she begg'd for the sake of Jesus, to be strangled first: whereupon the Executioner drew tight the halter, but the flame coming to his hand in the space of a second, he let it go, when she gave three dreadful shrieks; but the flames taking her on all sides, she was heard no more; and the Executioner throwing a piece of timber into the Fire, it broke her skull, when her brains came plentifully out; and in about an hour more she was entirely reduced to ashes.

==== Scotland ====
James VI of Scotland (later James I of England) shared the Danish king's interest in witch trials. This special interest of the king resulted in the North Berwick witch trials, which led more than seventy people to be accused of witchcraft. James sailed in 1590 to Denmark to meet his betrothed, Anne of Denmark, who, ironically, is believed by some to have secretly converted to Roman Catholicism herself from Lutheranism around 1598, although historians are divided on whether she ever was received into the Roman Catholic faith.

The last to be executed as a witch in Scotland was Janet Horne in 1727, condemned to death for using her own daughter as a flying horse in order to travel. Horne was burnt alive in a tar barrel.

==== Ireland ====
Petronilla de Meath (c. 1300–1324) was the maidservant of Dame Alice Kyteler, a 14th-century Hiberno-Norman noblewoman. After the death of Kyteler's fourth husband, the widow was accused of practicing witchcraft and Petronilla of being her accomplice. Petronilla was tortured and forced to proclaim that she and Kyteler were guilty of witchcraft. Petronilla was then flogged and eventually burnt at the stake on 3 November 1324, in Kilkenny, Ireland. Hers was the first known case in the history of the British Isles of death by fire for the crime of heresy. Kyteler was charged by the Bishop of Ossory, Richard de Ledrede, with a wide slate of crimes, from sorcery and demonism to the murders of several husbands. She was accused of having illegally acquired her wealth through witchcraft, which accusations came principally from her stepchildren, the children of her late husbands by their previous marriages. The trial predated any formal witchcraft statute in Ireland, thus relying on ecclesiastical law (which treated witchcraft as heresy) rather than common law (which treated it as a felony). Under torture, Petronilla claimed she and her mistress applied a magical ointment to a wooden beam, which enabled both women to fly. She was then forced to proclaim publicly that Lady Alice and her followers were guilty of witchcraft. Some were convicted and whipped, but others, Petronilla included, were burnt at the stake. With the help of relatives, Alice Kyteler fled, taking with her Petronilla's daughter, Basilia.

In 1327 or 1328, Adam Duff O'Toole was burned at the stake in Dublin for heresy after branding Christian scripture a fable and denying the resurrection of Jesus.

The brothel madam Darkey Kelly was convicted of murdering shoemaker John Dowling in 1760 and burned at the stake in Dublin on 7 January 1761. Later legends claimed that she was a serial killer and/or witch.

Alice Moran was burned at the stake at Gallows Green, Limerick on 23 April 1768, for the posioning of Joan Sullivan in Bruree, County Limerick.

In 1895, Bridget Cleary (née Boland), a County Tipperary woman, was burnt by her husband and others, the stated motive for the crime being the belief that the real Bridget had been abducted by fairies with a changeling left in her place. Her husband claimed to have slain only the changeling. The gruesome nature of the case prompted extensive press coverage. The trial was closely followed by newspapers in both Ireland and Britain. As one reviewer commented, nobody, with the possible exception of the presiding judge, thought it was an ordinary murder case.

==== Greece ====
The Greek War of Independence in the 1820s contained several instances of death by burning. When the Greeks in April 1821 captured a corvette near Hydra, the Greeks chose to roast to death the 57 Ottoman crew members. After the fall of Tripolitsa in September 1821, European officers were horrified to note that not only were Muslims suspected of hiding money being slowly roasted after having had their arms and legs cut off but also, in one instance, three Muslim children were roasted over a fire while their parents were forced to watch. On their part, the Ottomans committed many similar acts. In retaliation they gathered up Greeks in Constantinople, throwing several of them into huge ovens, baking them to death.

==== Last judicial burnings ====
According to the jurist Eduard Osenbrüggen, the last case he knew of where a person had been judicially burned alive on account of arson in Germany happened in 1804, in Hötzelsroda, close by Eisenach. The manner in which Johannes Thomas was executed on 13 July that year is described as follows: Some feet above the actual pyre, attached to a stake, a wooden chamber had been constructed, into which the delinquent was placed. Pipes or chimneys filled with sulphuric material led up to the chamber, and that was first lit, so that Thomas died from inhaling the sulphuric smoke, rather than being strictly burnt alive, before his body was consumed by the general fire. Some 20,000 people had gathered to watch Thomas' execution.

Although Thomas is regarded as the last to have been actually executed by means of fire (in this case, through suffocation), the couple Johann Christoph Peter Horst and his lover Friederike Louise Christiane Delitz, who had made a career of robberies in the confusion made by their acts of arson, were condemned to be burnt alive in Berlin 28 May 1813. They were, however, according to Gustav Radbruch, secretly strangled just prior to being burnt, namely when their arms and legs were tied fast to the stake.

Although these two cases are the last where execution by burning might be said to have been carried out in some degree, Eduard Osenbrüggen mentions that verdicts to be burned alive were given in several cases in different German states afterwards, such as in cases from 1814, 1821, 1823, 1829 and finally in a case from 1835.

=== Colonial Americas ===
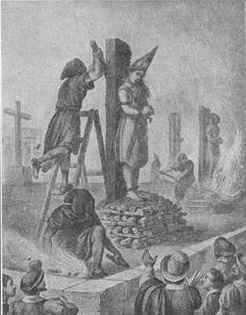
Execution of Mariana de Carabajal (converted Jew), Mexico City, 1601

==== North America ====
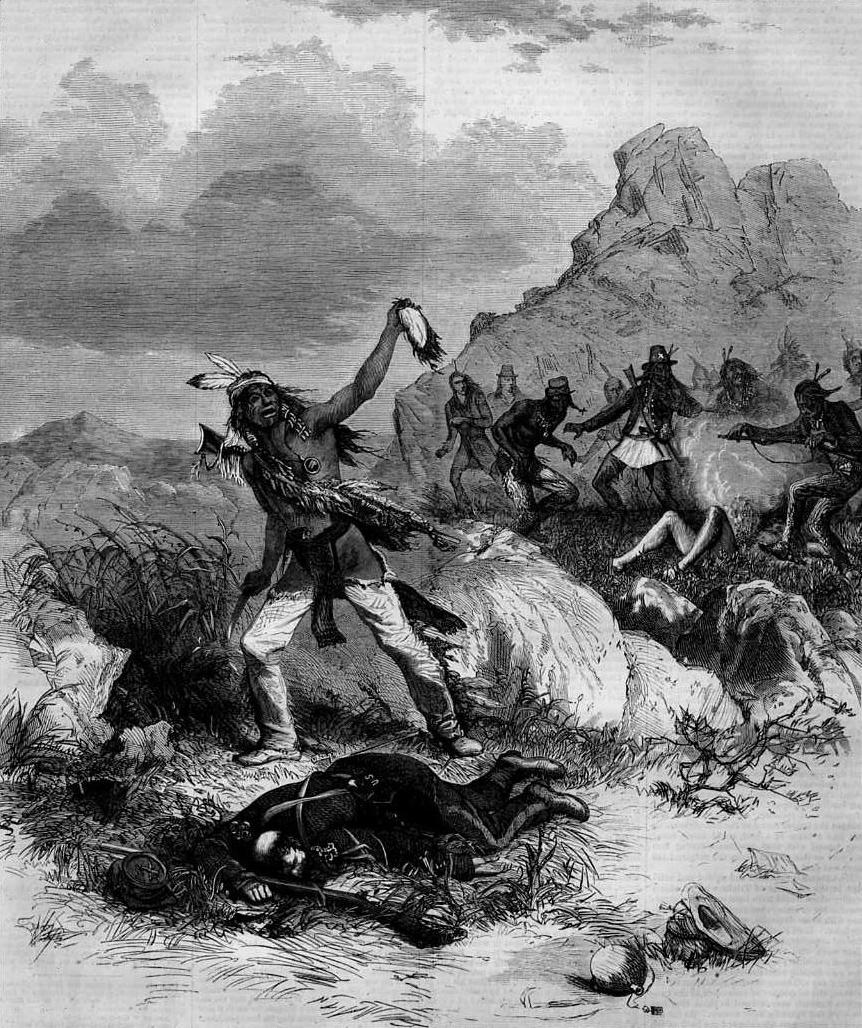
Native Americans scalping and roasting their prisoners, published in 1873

Indigenous North Americans often used burning as a form of execution, against members of other tribes or white settlers during the 18th and 19th centuries. Roasting over a slow fire was a customary method. (See Captives in American Indian Wars.)

In Massachusetts, there are two known cases of burning at the stake. First, in 1681, a slave named Maria was accused of trying to kill her owner by setting his house on fire. She was convicted of arson and burned at the stake in Roxbury. Concurrently, a slave named Jack, convicted in a separate arson case, was hanged at a nearby gallows, and after death his body was thrown into the fire with that of Maria. Second, in 1755, a group of slaves accused of having conspired and killed their enslaver, Mark and Phillis were executed for his murder. Mark was hanged and his body gibbeted, and Phillis burned at the stake, at Cambridge.

In Montreal, then part of the colony of New France, Marie-Joseph Angélique, a slave, was sentenced to being burned alive for an arson which destroyed 45 homes and a hospital in 1734. The sentence was commuted on appeal to burning after death by strangulation.

In New York, several burnings at the stake are recorded, particularly following suspected slave revolt plots. In 1708, one woman was burnt and one man hanged. In the aftermath of the New York Slave Revolt of 1712, 20 slaves were burnt (one of the leaders slowly roasted, before he died after 10 hours of torture) and during the alleged slave conspiracy of 1741, at least 13 slaves were burnt at the stake.

In 1731, 51-year-old Delaware housewife Catherine Bevan was burned for murder, and in 1746, Esther Anderson was burned in Maryland for another murder.

In an opinion piece published in the Washington Post, Emory University historian Kali Nicole Gross asserted that 87% percent of the women executed by burning at the stake in the US and its predecessor colonies between 1681 and 1805 were Black.

==== South America ====
The last known burning by the Spanish colonial government in Latin America was of Mariana de Castro, during the Peruvian Inquisition in Lima on 22 December 1736 after she had been convicted on 4 February 1732 of being a judaizante (a person who was privately practicing the Jewish faith after having publicly converted to Roman Catholicism).

In 1855 the Dutch abolitionist and historian Julien Wolbers spoke to the Anti Slavery Society in Amsterdam. Painting a dark picture of the condition of slaves in Suriname, he mentions in particular that in 1853, "three Negroes were burnt alive".

==== West Indies ====
In 1760, the slave rebellion known as Tacky's War broke out in Jamaica. Apparently, some of the defeated rebels were burned alive, while others were gibbeted alive, left to die of thirst and starvation.

In 1774, nine enslaved Africans in Tobago were found complicit of murdering a white man. Eight of them had first their right arms chopped off, and were then burned alive bound to stakes, according to the report of an eyewitness.

In Saint-Domingue, enslaved Africans found guilty of committing crimes were sometimes punished by being burnt at the stake, particularly if the crime was attempting to foment a slave rebellion.

=== Islamic countries ===
Execution by burning is forbidden in Sharia Law.

==== Followers of a false claimant of prophethood ====
The Arab chieftain Tulayha ibn Khuwaylid ibn Nawfal al-Asad set himself up as a prophet in 630 AD. Tulayha had a strong following which was, however, soon quashed in the so-called Ridda Wars. He himself escaped, though, and later was reconverted to Islam, but many of his rebel followers were burnt to death; his mother chose to embrace the same fate.

==== Catholic monks in 13th-century Tunis and Morocco ====
A number of monks are said to have been burnt alive in Tunis and Morocco in the 13th century. In 1243, two English monks, Brothers Rodulph and Berengarius, after having secured the release of some 60 captives, were charged with being spies for the English Crown, and were burnt alive on 9 September. In 1262, Brothers Patrick and William, again having freed captives, but also sought to proselytize among Muslims, were burnt alive in Morocco. In 1271, 11 Catholic monks were burnt alive in Tunis. Several other cases are reported.

==== Converts to Christianity ====
Apostasy, i.e. the act of converting to another religion, was (and remains so in a few countries) punishable with death.

The French traveller Jean de Thevenot, traveling the East in the 1650s, says: "Those that turn Christians, they burn alive, hanging a bag of Powder about their neck, and putting a pitched Cap upon their Head." Travelling the same regions some 60 years earlier, Fynes Moryson writes:

A Turke forsaking his Fayth and a Christian speaking or doing anything against the law of Mahomett are burnt with fyer.

==== Muslim heretics ====
Certain accursed ones of no significance is the term used by Taş Köprü Zade in the Şakaiki Numaniye to describe some members of the Hurufiyya who became intimate with the Sultan Mehmed II to the extent of initiating him as a follower. This alarmed members of the Ulema, particularly Mahmut Paşa, who then consulted Mevlana Fahreddin. Fahreddin hid in the Sultan's palace and heard the Hurufis propound their doctrines. Considering these heretical, he reviled them with curses. The Hurufis fled to the Sultan, but Fahreddin's denunciation of them was so virulent that Mehmed II was unable to defend them. Farhreddin then took them in front of the Üç Şerefeli Mosque, Edirne, where he publicly condemned them to death. While preparing the fire for their execution, Fahreddin accidentally set fire to his beard. However, the Hurufis were burnt to death.

==== Barbary States, 18th century ====
John Braithwaite, staying in Morocco in the late 1720s, says that apostates from Islam would be burnt alive:

THOSE that can be proved after Circumcision to have revolted, are stripped quite naked, then anointed with Tallow, and with a Chain about the Body, brought to the Place of Execution, where they are burnt.

Similarly, he notes that non-Muslims entering mosques or being blasphemous against Islam will be burnt, unless they convert to Islam. The chaplain for the English in Algiers at the same time, Thomas Shaw, wrote that whenever capital crimes were committed either by Christian slaves or Jews, the Christian or Jew was to be burnt alive. Several generations later, in Morocco in 1772, a Jewish interpreter for the British, and a merchant in his own right, sought from the Emperor of Morocco restitution for some goods confiscated, and was burnt alive for his impertinence. His widow made her woes clear in a letter to the British government.

In 1792 in Ifrane, Morocco, 50 Jews preferred to be burned alive, rather than convert to Islam. In 1794 in Algiers, the Jewish Rabbi Mordecai Narboni was accused of having maligned Islam in a quarrel with his neighbour. He was ordered to be burnt alive unless he converted to Islam, but he refused and was therefore executed on 14 July 1794.

In 1793, Ali Pasha made a short-lived coup d'état in Tripoli, deposing the ruling Karamanli dynasty. During his short, violent reign he seized the two interpreters for the Dutch and English consuls, both of them Jews, and roasted them over a slow fire, on charges of conspiracy and espionage.

==== Persia ====
During a famine in Persia in 1668, the government took severe measures against those trying to profiteer from the misfortune of the populace. Restaurant owners found guilty of profiteering were slowly roasted on spits, and greedy bakers were baked in their own ovens.

Dr C. J. Wills, a physician traveling through Persia in 1866–1881, wrote that:

Just prior to my first arrival in Persia, the "Hissam-u-Sultaneh", another uncle of the king, had burned a priest to death for a horrible crime and murder; the priest was chained to a stake, and the matting from the mosques piled on him to a great height, the pile of mats was lighted and burnt freely, but when the mats were consumed the priest was found groaning, but still alive. The executioner went to Hissam-u-Sultaneh who ordered him to obtain more mats, pour naphtha on them, and apply a light, which 'after some hours' he did.

==== Malaya ====
Although not burning with the use of fire, a practice was documented in 19th-century Malaya of sewing a live human in a buffalo hide and left it exposed to the burning sun which caused the hide to shrink and led the person to be squeezed to death.

=== Roasting by means of heated metal ===
The previous cases concern primarily death by burning through contact with open fire or burning material; a slightly different principle is to enclose an individual within, or attach him to, a metal contraption which is subsequently heated. In the following, some reports of such incidents, or anecdotes about such are included.

==== The brazen bull ====
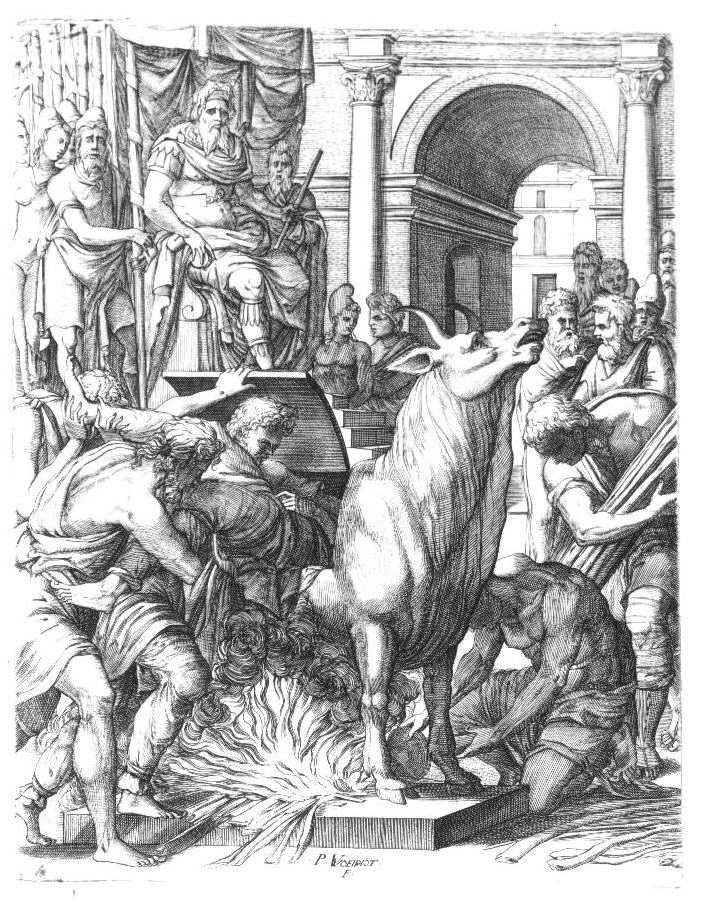
Perillos being forced into the brazen bull that he built for Phalaris

Perhaps the most infamous example of a brazen bull, which is a hollow metal structure shaped like a bull within which the condemned is put, and then roasted alive as the metal bull is gradually heated up, is the one allegedly constructed by Perillos of Athens for the 6th-century BC tyrant Phalaris at Agrigentum, Sicily. As the story goes, the first victim of the bull was its constructor Perillos himself. The historian George Grote was among those regarding this story as having sufficient evidence behind it to be true, and points particularly to that the Greek poet Pindar, working just one or two generations after the times of Phalaris, refers to the brazen bull. A bronze bull was, in fact, one of the spoils of victory when the Carthaginians conquered Agrigentum. The story of a brazen bull as an execution device is not unique. About 1,000 years later, in 497 AD, it can be read in an old chronicle about the Visigoths on the Iberian Peninsula and the south of France:

Burdunellus became a tyrant in Spain and a year later was ... handed over by his own men and having been sent to Toulouse, he was placed inside a bronze bull and burnt to death.

==== Fate of a Scottish regicide ====
Walter Stewart, Earl of Atholl was a Scottish nobleman complicit in the murder of King James I of Scotland. On 26 March 1437 a red hot iron crown was placed upon his head, was cut in pieces alive, his heart was taken out, and his body was thrown into a fire. A papal nuncio, the later Pope Pius II witnessed the execution of Stewart and his associate Sir Robert Graham, and, reportedly, said he was at a loss to determine whether the crime committed by the regicides, or the punishment of them was the greater.

==== György Dózsa on the iron throne ====
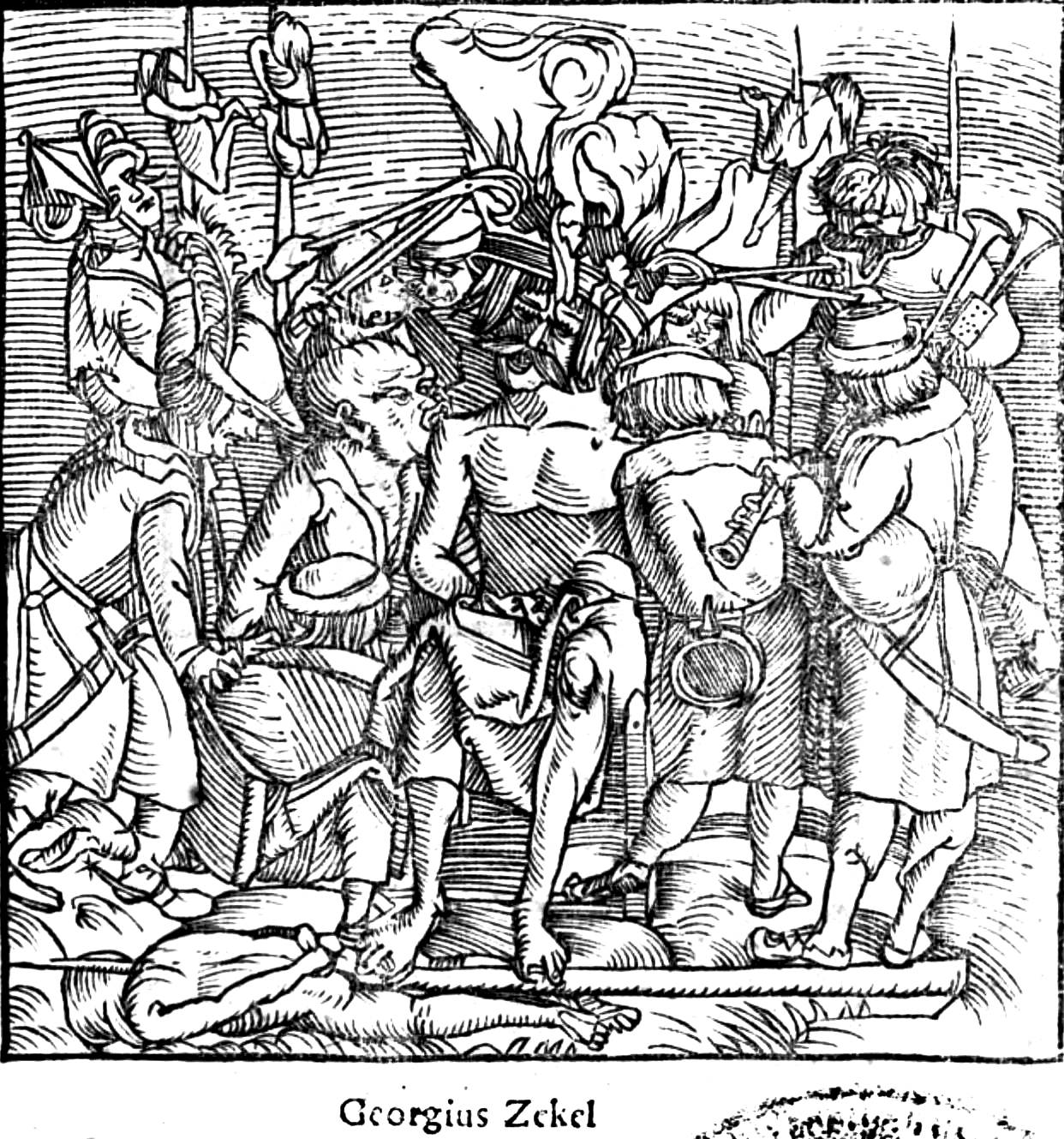
Dózsa's execution (contemporary woodcut)

György Dózsa led a peasants' revolt in Hungary, and was captured in 1514. He was bound to a glowing iron throne and a likewise hot iron crown was placed on his head, and he was roasted to death.

==== The tale of the murderous midwife ====
In a few English 18th- and 19th-century newspapers and magazines, a tale was circulated about the particularly brutal manner in which a French midwife was put to death on 28 May 1673 in Paris. No fewer than 62 infant skeletons were found buried on her premises, and she was condemned on multiple accounts of abortion/infanticide. One detailed account of her supposed execution runs as follows:

A gibbet was erected, under which a fire was made, and the prisoner being brought to the place of execution, was hung up in a large iron cage, in which were also placed sixteen wild cats, which had been catched in the woods for the purpose.—When the heat of the fire became too great to be endured with patience, the cats flew upon the woman, as the cause of the intense pain they felt.—In about fifteen minutes they had pulled out her entrails, though she continued yet alive, and sensible, imploring, as the greatest favour, an immediate death from the hands of some charitable spectator. No one however dared to afford her the least assistance; and she continued in this wretched situation for the space of thirty-five minutes, and then expired in unspeakable torture. At the time of her death, twelve of the cats were expired, and the other four were all dead in less than two minutes afterwards.

The English commentator adds his own view on the matter:

However cruel this execution may appear with regard to the poor animals, it certainly cannot be thought too severe a punishment for such a monster of iniquity, as could calmly proceed in acquiring a fortune by the deliberate murder of such numbers of unoffending, harmless innocents. And if a method of executing murderers, in a manner somewhat similar to this was adapted in England, perhaps the horrid crime of murder might not so frequently disgrace the annals of the present times.

The English story is derived from a pamphlet published in 1673.

=== Pouring molten metal down the throat or ears ===
==== Molten metal poured down the throat ====
In 88 BC, Mithridates VI of Pontus captured the Roman general Manius Aquillius, and executed him by pouring molten gold down his throat. A popular but unsubstantiated rumor also had the Parthians executing the famously greedy Roman general Marcus Licinius Crassus in this manner in 53 BC.

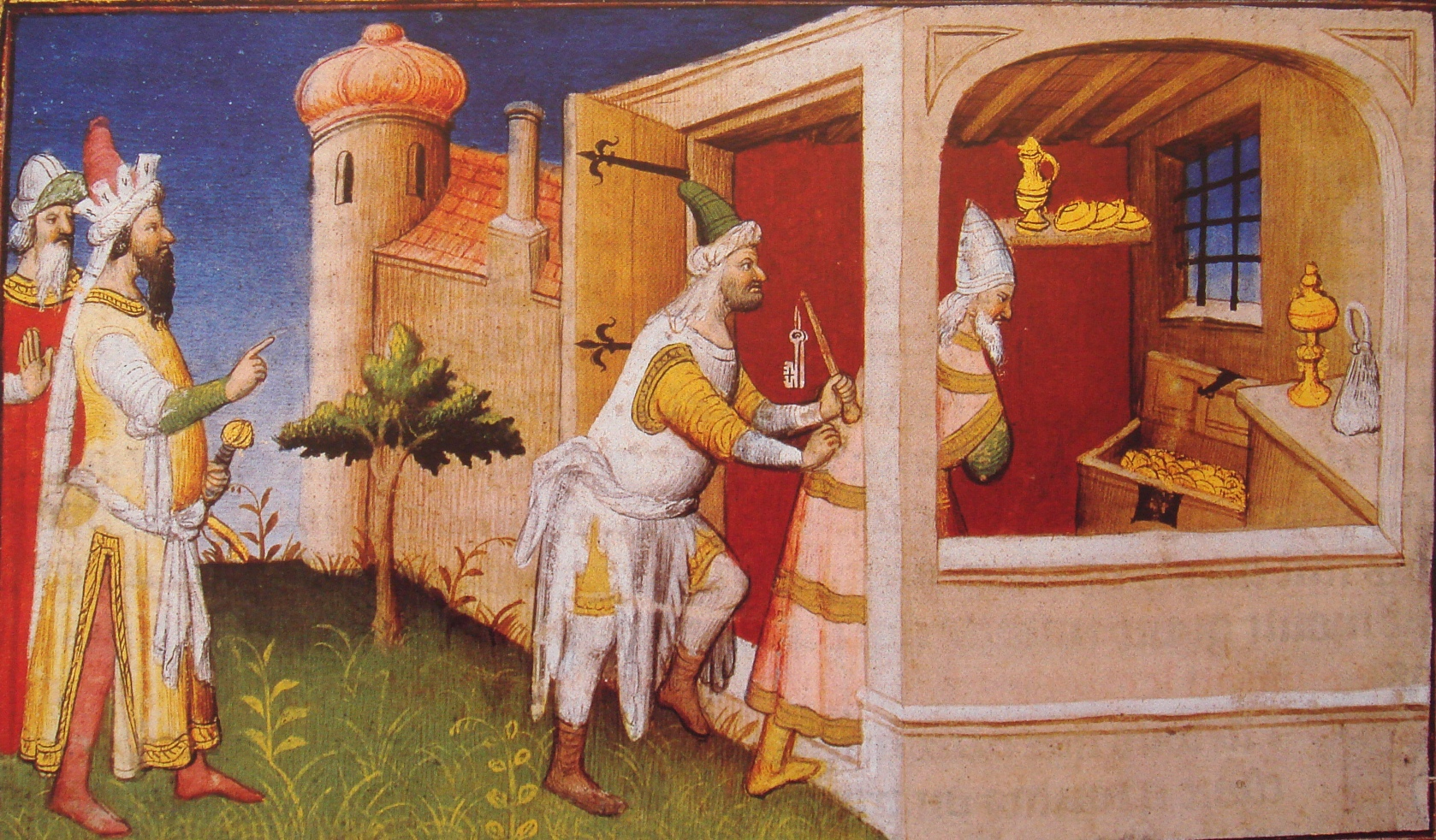
Hulagu (left) imprisons Caliph Al-Musta'sim among his treasures to starve him to death (medieval depiction from "Le livre des merveilles", 15th century).

A law of Constantine the Great ordered that slaves who betrayed their mistress's confidential remarks should have molten lead poured down their throats.

Genghis Khan is said to have ordered the execution of Inalchuq, the perfidious Khwarazmian governor of Otrar, by pouring molten gold or silver down his throat in c. 1220, and an early-14th-century chronicle mentions that his grandson Hulagu Khan did likewise to the sultan Al-Musta'sim after the fall of Baghdad in 1258 to the Mongol army. (Marco Polo's version is that Al-Musta'sim was locked without food or water to starve in his treasure room)

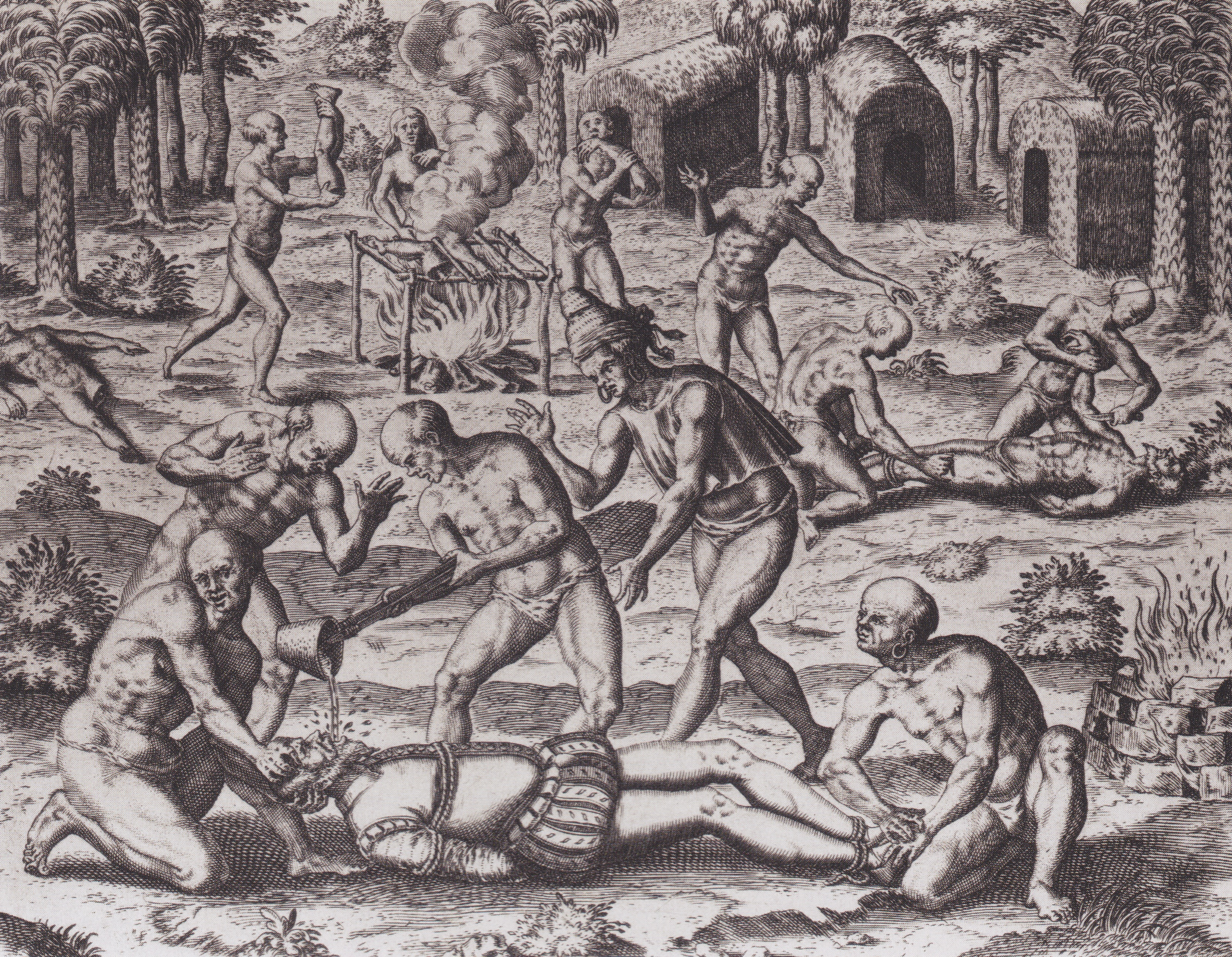
Theodor de Bry engraving of a Conquistador being executed by gold

The Spanish in 16th-century Americas gave horrified reports that the Spanish who had been captured by the natives (who had learnt of the Spanish thirst for gold) had their feet and hands bound, and then molten gold poured down their throats as the victims were mocked: "Eat, eat gold, Christians".

From the 19th-century reports from the Kingdom of Siam (present-day Thailand) stated that those who have defrauded the public treasury could have either molten gold or silver poured down their throat.

==== As punishment for inebriation and tobacco smoking ====
The 16th-/early-17th-century prime minister Malik Ambar in the Deccan Ahmadnagar Sultanate would not tolerate inebriation among his subjects, and would pour molten lead down the mouths of those caught in that condition. Similarly, in the 17th-century Sultanate of Aceh, Sultan Iskandar Muda (r. 1607–36) is said to have poured molten lead into the mouths of at least two drunken subjects. Military discipline in 19th-century Burma was reportedly harsh, with strict prohibition of smoking opium or drinking arrack. Some monarchs had ordained pouring molten lead down the throats of those who drank, "but it has been found necessary to relax this severity, in order to conciliate the army."

Shah Safi I of Persia is said to have abhorred tobacco, and apparently in 1634, he prescribed the punishment of pouring molten lead into the throats of smokers.

==== Mongol punishment for horse thieves ====
According to historian Pushpa Sharma, stealing a horse was considered the most heinous offence within the Mongol army, and the criminal would either have molten lead poured into his ears, or alternatively, his punishment would be the breaking of the spinal cord or beheading.

=== Chinese tradition of Buddhist self-immolation ===
For many centuries, a tradition of devotional self-immolation existed among Buddhist monks in China. One monk who immolated himself in 527 AD explained his intent a year before, in the following manner:

The body is like a poisonous plant; it would really be right to burn it and extinguish its life. I have been weary of this physical frame for many a long day. I vow to worship the buddhas, just like Xijian.

A severe critic in the 16th century wrote the following comment on this practice:

There are demonic people ... who pour on oil, stack up firewood, and burn their bodies while still alive. Those who look on are overawed and consider it the attainment of enlightenment. This is erroneous.

=== Japan ===
While the earliest record of death by burning in Japan appears in "Nihonshoki", on Ishikawa no Tate and Iketsuhime during the reign of Emperor Yuryaku, the contemporary code of law did not survive and the historical authenticity of this event is uncertain. The oldest preserved written code, the Yōrō Code, did not mention death by burning—mentions of capital punishment involve death by either strangulation or sword.

The historically reliable earliest record of death by burning was ruled by Oda Nobukatsu.

In the first half of the 17th century, Japanese authorities sporadically persecuted Christians, with some executions seeing persons being burnt alive. At Nagasaki in 1622 some 25 monks were burnt alive, and in Edo in 1624, 50 Christians were burnt alive.

The Tokugawa Shogunate included death by burning into their criminal code. Arsonists were often sentenced to death by burning but not always. They might be sentenced to exile instead.

Execution by burning was abolished in 1868 during the Meiji Restoration.

=== Mughal Empire ===
Bhai Sati Das, a Sikh martyr was burned with cotton wool soaked in oil on the orders of Emperor Aurangzeb after he refused to convert to Islam.

=== Indian widow burning ===
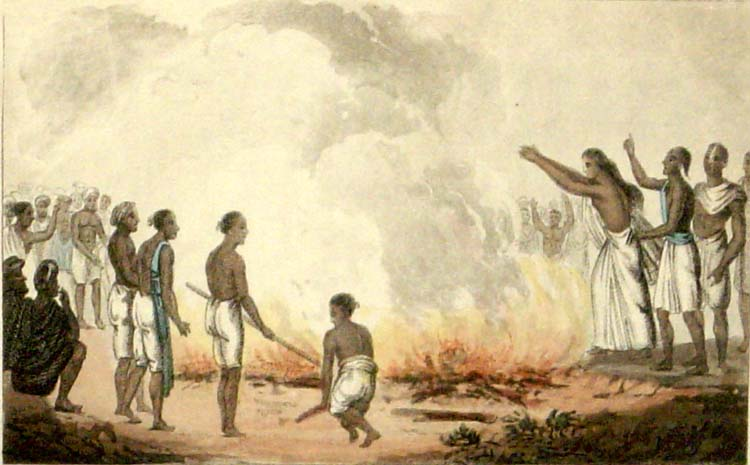
A Hindu widow burning herself with the corpse of her husband, 1820s

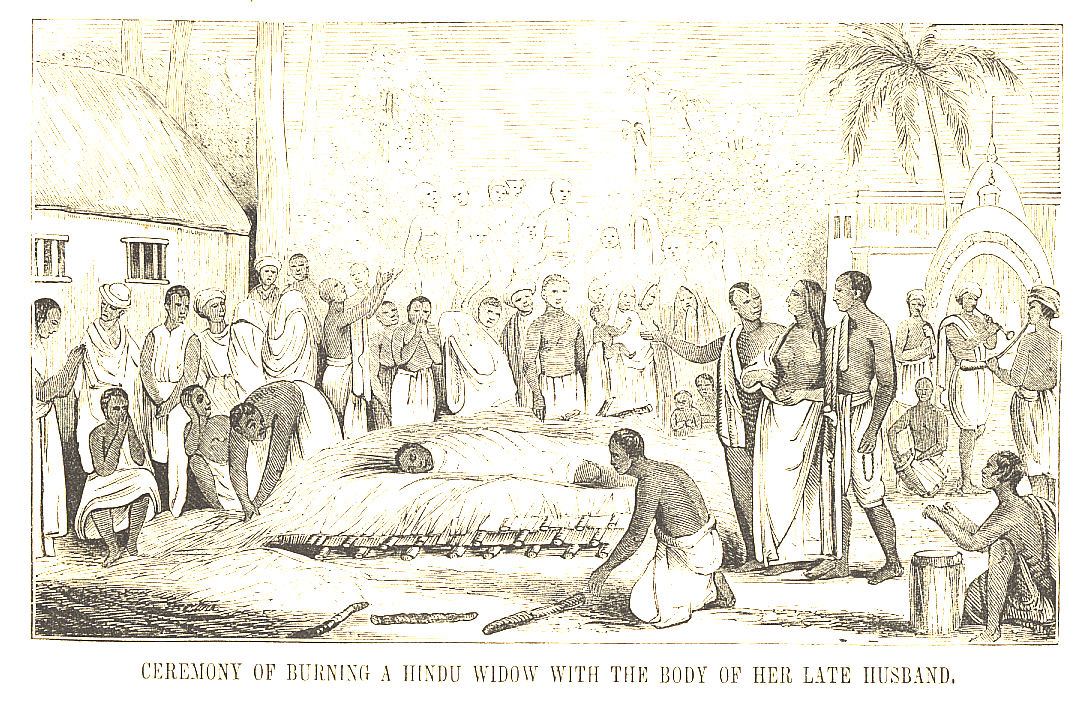
Ceremony of Burning a Hindu Widow with the Body of her Late Husband, from Pictorial History of China and India, 1851

Sati refers to a funeral practice among some communities of Indian subcontinent in which a recently widowed woman immolates herself on her husband's funeral pyre. The first reliable evidence for the practice of sati appears from the time of the Gupta Empire (400 AD), when instances of sati began to be marked by inscribed memorial stones.

According to one model of history thinking, the practice of sati only became really widespread with the Muslim invasions of India, and the practice of sati now acquired a new meaning as a means to preserve the honour of women whose men had been slain. As S. S. Sashi lays out, "The argument is that the practice came into effect during the Islamic invasion of India, to protect their honor from Muslims who were known to commit mass rape on the women of cities that they could capture successfully." It is also said that according to the memorial stone evidence, the practice was carried out in appreciable numbers in western and southern parts of India, and even in some areas, during pre-Islamic times. Some of the rulers and activists of the time sought actively to suppress the practice of sati.

The East India Company began to compile statistics of the incidences of sati for all their domains from 1815 and onwards. The official statistics for Bengal represent that the practice was much more common there than elsewhere, recorded numbers typically in the range 500–600 per year, up to the year 1829, when Company authorities banned the practice. Since the 19th and 20th centuries, the practice remains outlawed in the Indian subcontinent.

Jauhar was a practice among royal Hindu women to prevent capture by Muslim conquerors.

In Nepal, the practice was not banned until 1920.

The practice of burning widows has not been restricted to the Indian subcontinent; in Bali, the practice was called masatia and was restricted to the burning of royal widows. This practice likely resulted from the spread of Hindu culture into Southeast Asia. Although the Dutch colonial authorities had banned the practice, one such occasion is known as late as 1903.

=== Sub-Saharan Africa ===
C. H. L. Hahn wrote that within the O-ndnonga tribe among the Ovambo people in modern-day Namibia, abortion was not used at all (in contrast to among the other tribes), and that furthermore, if two young unwed individuals had sex resulting in pregnancy, then both the girl and the boy were "taken out to the bush, bound up in bundles of grass and ... burnt alive."

=== Indigenous cannibalism ===
==== Americas ====
Even fateful encounters with cannibals are recorded: in 1514, in the Americas, Francis of Córdoba and five companions were, reportedly, caught, impaled on spits, roasted and eaten by the natives. In 1543, such was also the end of a previous bishop, Vincent de Valle Viridi.

==== Fiji ====
In 1844, the missionary John Watsford wrote a letter about the internecine wars on Fiji, and how captives could be eaten, after being roasted alive:

At Mbau, perhaps, more human beings are eaten than anywhere else. A few weeks ago they ate twenty-eight in one day. They had seized their wretched victims while fishing, and brought them alive to Mbau, and there half-killed them, and then put them into their ovens. Some of them made several vain attempts to escape from the scorching flame.

The actual manner of the roasting process was described by the missionary pioneer David Cargill, in 1838:

When about to be immolated, he is made to sit on the ground with his feet under his thighs and his hands placed before him. He is then bound so that he cannot move a limb or a joint. In this posture he is placed on stones heated for the occasion (and some of them are red-hot), and then covered with leaves and earth, to be roasted alive. When cooked, he is taken out of the oven and, his face and other parts being painted black, that he may resemble a living man ornamented for a feast or for war, he is carried to the temple of the gods and, being still retained in a sitting posture, is offered as a propitiatory sacrifice.

=== Legislation against the practice ===
In 1790, Sir Benjamin Hammett introduced a bill into the British Parliament to end the practice of judicial burning. He explained that the year before, as Sheriff of London, he had been responsible for the burning of Catherine Murphy, found guilty of counterfeiting, but that he had allowed her to be hanged first. He pointed out that as the law stood, he himself could have been found guilty of a crime in not carrying out the lawful punishment and, as no woman had been burnt alive in the kingdom for more than half a century, so could all those still alive who had held an official position at all of the previous burnings. The Treason Act 1790 was duly passed by Parliament and given royal assent by King George III (30 George III. C. 48). The Parliament of Ireland subsequently passed the similar Treason by Women Act (Ireland) 1796.

== Modern burnings ==
In the modern era, deaths by burning are largely extrajudicial in nature. These killings may be committed by mobs, small numbers of criminals, or paramilitary groups.

=== The Holocaust and German war crimes ===
In 1941, Polish natives—in cooperation with German police—locked 340 Jews in a barn and set it on fire during the Jedwabne pogrom. During the 1943 Khatyn massacre, the SS-Sonderbataillon Dirlewanger and the Schutzmannschaft Battalion 118—a German-sponsored battalion of Ukrainian partisans—locked 149 Belarusian villagers into a shed and set it on fire. The World Jewish Restitution Organisation reported to The Jerusalem Post that the German staff of Auschwitz burnt children alive in 1944. In another 1944 atrocity, the Waffen SS locked 452 French women and children in a church and set it on fire. German prosecutors charged an alleged perpetrator of that massacre in 2014. SS-Sturmbannführer Adolf Diekmann—commander of the 1st Battalion, 4th SS Panzer Grenadier Regiment—ordered the massacre, claiming retaliation against French partisans for burning SS-Sturmbannführer Helmut Kämpfe alive. In April 1945, the SS camp guards of Dora-Mittelbau—along with local civilian and military authorities—set a barn on fire with more than a thousand inmates trapped inside.

=== Revenge against Germans ===
Benjamin B. Ferencz, one of the prosecutors in the Nuremberg trials after the end of World War II who, in May 1945, investigated occurrences at the Ebensee concentration camp, narrated them to Tom Hofmann, a family member and biographer. Ferencz was outraged at what the Germans had done there. When people discovered an SS guard who attempted to flee, they tied him to one of the metal trays used to transport bodies into the crematorium. They then lit the oven and slowly roasted the SS guard to death, taking him in and out of the oven several times. Ferencz said to Hofmann that at the time, he was in no position to stop the proceedings of the mob, and frankly admitted that he had not been inclined to try. Hofmann adds, "There seemed to be no limit to human brutality in wartime."

=== Lynching of Germans in Czechoslovakia ===
During the post-World War II expulsion of Germans from Czechoslovakia, a number of attacks against the German minority occurred. In one case in Prague in May 1945, a Czech mob hanged several Germans upside down on lampposts, doused them in fuel and set them on fire, burning them alive. The future literature scholar Peter Demetz, who grew up in Prague, later reported on this.

=== Japanese war crimes of WWII ===
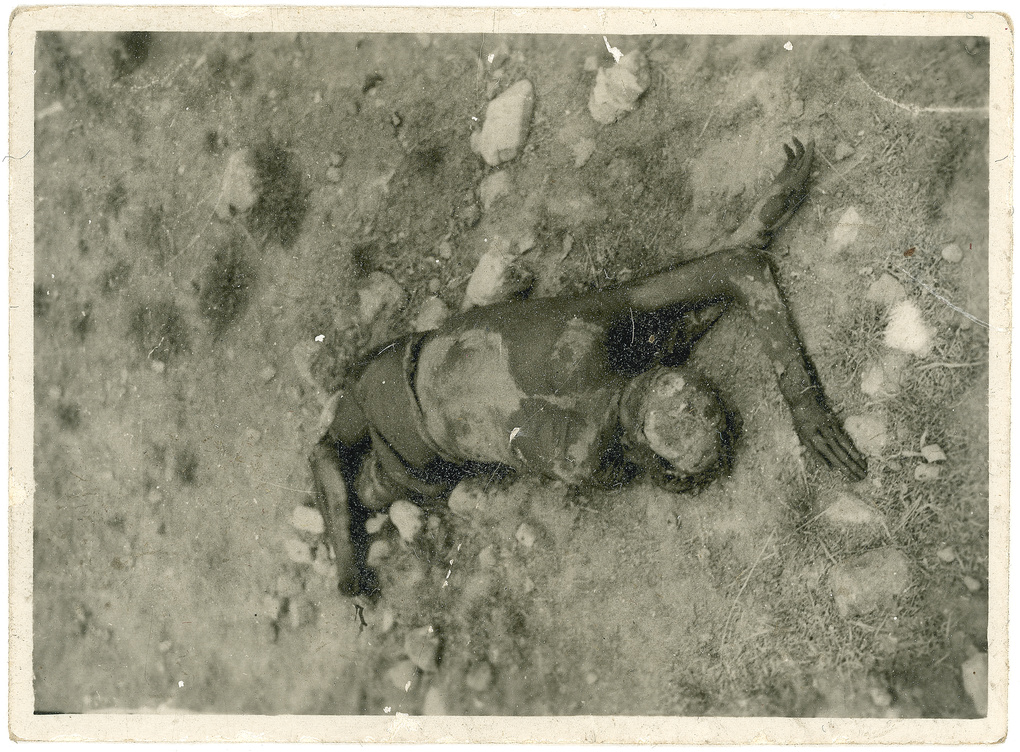
The decaying corpse of a person burned to death in Hebei, about 1938–1939

Immolation was a commonly reported execution method among Imperial Japanese troops during World War II. During the Nanjing Massacre after Japanese forces captured the city of Nanjing in 1937, immolation was a commonly used method of execution and brutality towards the Chinese people in Nanjing during the Imperial Japanese Army's occupation of the city.

The most infamous case of the Imperial Japanese military utilizing this method of execution on Allied prisoners of war was the Palawan massacre in the Philippines in the midst of the United States military's campaign to retake the Philippines. To prevent the rescue of the POWs by liberating American forces, the 150 American POWs in the Palawan prison camp; Camp 10-A were herded into air raid shelters via air raid sirens. The Japanese guards, taking advantage of the POWs being confined in the shelters, then doused the shelter entrances with gasoline before lighting them on fire. They then fired a few shots into the entrances to hit the POWs standing near the entrances in order to use their bodies to trap the other POWs that were deeper inside the shelter and engulf them all in the inferno. Any POWs who did manage to dig themselves out of the trench and escape the flames were hunted down. At the end of the ordeal, only 11 POWs managed to escape to friendly lines.

=== Extrajudicial burnings in Latin America ===
In Rio de Janeiro, Brazil, burning people standing inside a pile of tires is a common form of murder used by drug dealers to punish those who have supposedly collaborated with the police. This form of burning is called micro-ondas (microwave oven). The film Tropa de Elite (Elite Squad) and the video game Max Payne 3 contain scenes depicting this practice.

During the Guatemalan Civil War, the Guatemalan Army and security forces carried out an unknown number of extrajudicial killings by burning. In one instance in March 1967, Guatemalan guerrilla and poet Otto René Castillo was captured by Guatemalan government forces and taken to Zacapa army barracks alongside one of his comrades, Nora Paíz Cárcamo. The two were interrogated, tortured for four days, and burned alive. Other reported instances of immolation by Guatemalan government forces occurred in the Guatemalan government's rural counterinsurgency operations in the Guatemalan Altiplano in the 1980s. In April 1982, 13 members of a Qʼanjobʼal Pentecostal congregation in Xalbal, Ixcan, were burnt alive in their church by the Guatemalan Army.

On 31 August 1996, a Mexican man, Rodolfo Soler Hernandez, was burned to death in Playa Vicente, Mexico, after he was accused of raping and strangling a local woman to death. Local residents tied Hernandez to a tree, doused him in a flammable liquid and then set him ablaze. His death was also filmed by residents of the village. Shots taken before the killing showed that he had been badly beaten. On 5 September 1996, Mexican television stations broadcast footage of the murder. Locals carried out the killing because they were fed up with crime and believed that the police and courts were both incompetent. Footage was also shown in the 1998 shockumentary film, Banned from Television.

A young Guatemalan woman, Alejandra María Torres, was attacked by a mob in Guatemala City on 15 December 2009. The mob alleged that Torres had attempted to rob passengers on a bus. Torres was beaten, doused with gasoline, and set on fire, but was able to put the fire out before sustaining life-threatening burns. Police intervened and arrested Torres. Torres was forced to go topless throughout the ordeal and subsequent arrest, and many photographs were taken and published. Approximately 219 people were lynched in Guatemala in 2009, of whom 45 died.

In May 2015, a sixteen-year-old girl was allegedly burned to death in Río Bravo, Guatemala, by a vigilante mob after being accused of involvement in the killing of a taxi driver earlier in the month.

In Chile during public mass protests held against the military regime of General Augusto Pinochet on 2 July 1986, engineering student Carmen Gloria Quintana, 18, and Chilean-American photographer Rodrigo Rojas de Negri, 19, were arrested by a Chilean Army patrol in the Los Nogales neighborhood of Santiago. The two were searched and beaten before being doused in gasoline and burned alive by Chilean troops. Rojas was killed, while Quintana survived but with severe burns.

=== Lynchings and killings by burning in the United States ===
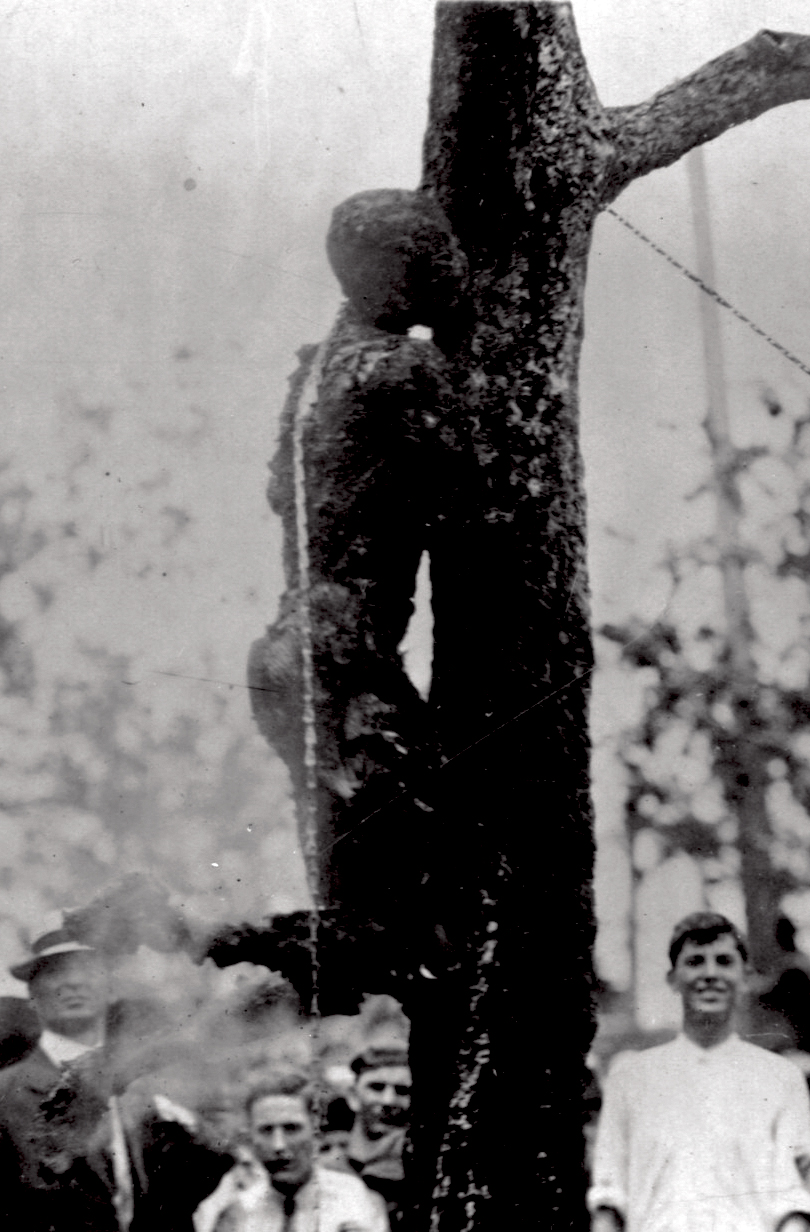
Lynching of Jesse Washington in Waco, Texas, on 15 May 1916. He was repeatedly lowered and raised onto a fire for about two hours.

Burnings continued as a method of lynching in the United States in the late 19th and early 20th centuries, particularly in the South. One of the most notorious extrajudicial burnings in modern history occurred in Waco, Texas on 15 May 1916. Jesse Washington, an African-American farmhand, after having been convicted of the rape and subsequent murder of a white woman, was taken by a mob to a bonfire, castrated, doused in coal oil, and hanged by the neck from a chain over the bonfire, slowly burning to death. A postcard from the event still exists, showing a crowd standing next to Washington's charred corpse with the words on the back "This is the barbecue we had last night. My picture is to the left with a cross over it. Your son, Joe". This attracted international condemnation and is remembered as the "Waco Horror".

More recently, during the 1980 New Mexico State Penitentiary riot, a number of inmates were burnt to death by fellow prisoners, who threw flammable liquids into locked cells and ignited the fuel using blowtorches.

=== Cases from Africa ===
In South Africa, extrajudicial executions by burning were carried out via "necklacing", wherein a mob would fill a rubber tire with kerosene (or gasoline) and place it around the neck of a live person. The fuel was then ignited, the rubber melted, and the victim burnt to death. The method was most commonly used during the 1980s and early 1990s by anti-Apartheid opposition. The first documented necklacing on live television SABC was with Maki Skosana who was accused of being a police informant. In 1986, Winnie Mandela, wife of the then-imprisoned ANC (African National Congress) leader Nelson Mandela, stated, "With our boxes of matches, and our necklaces, we shall liberate this country", which was widely seen as an explicit endorsement of necklacing. This caused the ANC to initially distance itself from her, although she later took on a number of official positions within the party.

It was reported that in Kenya, on 21 May 2008, a mob had burned to death at least 11 accused witches.

=== Cases from the Middle East and Indian subcontinent ===
Immolation was a common execution method for Armenian children, particularly orphans, with Ottoman troops during the Armenian genocide. Armenian children would be herded into a building to a secluded area outside the city in batches, doused in gasoline, and lit on fire. This practice took place in Der Zor, Kharpert and Diarbekir provinces, and most infamously, at a German run orphanage in Mush.

Graham Staines, an Australian Christian missionary, and his two sons Philip (aged ten) and Timothy (aged six), were burnt to death by a gang while the three slept in the family car (a station wagon), at Manoharpur village in Keonjhar District, Odisha, India on 22 January 1999. Four years later, in 2003, a Bajrang Dal activist, Dara Singh, was convicted of leading the gang that murdered Staines and his sons, and was sentenced to life in prison. Staines had worked in Odisha with the tribal poor and lepers since 1965. Some Hindu groups made allegations that Staines had forcibly converted or lured many Hindus into Christianity.

In January 2015, Jordanian pilot Moaz al-Kasasbeh was burned in a cage by the Islamic State of Iraq and the Levant (ISIS). The pilot was captured when his plane crashed near Raqqa, Syria, during a mission against IS in December 2014. This became known on 4 February 2015 after ISIS published a 22-minute video online showing the burning of a Jordanian pilot.

In August 2015, ISIS burned to death four Iraqi Shia prisoners.

In December 2016, ISIS burned to death two Turkish soldiers, publishing video of the atrocity.

In Bangladesh, during the final day of the July Revolution on 5 August 2024, five human bodies and one person were burned by the Bangladesh Police. The incident happened in front of the police station near Ashulia, Savar, Dhaka, which later prompted an ICT investigation.

=== Bride-burning ===
Bride burning is a form of domestic violence involving burning. The wife is typically doused with kerosene, gasoline, or other flammable liquid, and set alight, leading to death by fire. Kerosene is often used as the cooking fuel for small petrol stoves, some of which being dangerous, so it allows the claim that the crime was an accident.

On 20 January 2011, a 28-year-old woman, Ranjeeta Sharma, was found burning to death on a road in rural New Zealand. The police confirmed that she had been alive before being covered in an accelerant and set on fire. Sharma's husband, Davesh Sharma, was charged with her murder.

== See also ==
- Outline of capital punishment
- Death by boiling
- Jungle justice
- Muath al-Kasasbeh
- List of people burned as heretics
- Relaxado en persona
- Self-immolation
- Spontaneous human combustion
- Witchcraft Acts
- Yaoya Oshichi

== Bibliography ==
- de Almeida, Fortunato (1923). "Appendix IX". História da Igreja em Portugal. Vol. 4, 3. Oporto: Imprensa académica.
- Anderson, James M. (2002). Daily Life During the Spanish Inquisition. Westport, Connecticut: Greenwood Publishing Group. ISBN 978-0-313-31667-8.
- Barber, Malcolm (1993). The Trial of the Templars. Cambridge: Cambridge University Press. ISBN 978-0-521-45727-9.
- "Missionary widow continues leprosy work". BBC News. 27 January 1999.
- Begbie, Peter J. (1834). The Malayan Peninsula: Embracing Its History, Manners and Customs of the Inhabitants, Politics, Natural History, Etc. from Its Earliest Records. Madras: Author.
- Behringer, Wolfgang (2006). "Neun Millionen Hexen. Entstehung, Tradition und Kritik eines populären Mythos". historicum.net. Archived from the original on 28 January 2019.
- Ben-Menahem, Hanina; Edrei, Arye; Hecht, Neil S. (2012). "3, Exigency Authority". Windows Onto Jewish Legal Culture: Fourteen Exploratory Essays. London: Routledge. ISBN 978-0-415-50049-4.
- Benn, James A. (2007). Burning for the Buddha: Self-Immolation in Chinese Buddhism. University of Hawaii Press. ISBN 978-0-8248-2992-6.
- Berger, Stefan; Sicker, Dieter (2009). Classics in Spectroscopy. John Wiley & Sons. ISBN 978-3-527-32516-0.
- Bischoff (1832). Hitzig, Julius (ed.). "Wer ist im Sinne der Carolina als ein "boshafter überwundener Brenner" zu bestrafen?". Annalen der Deutschen und Ausländischen Criminal-Rechtspflege. 2 (Neue Folge), 14 (In total) (27). Berlin: Ferdinand Dümmler: 109–178.
- Blake, William O. (1857). The History of Slavery and the Slave Trade, Ancient and Modern. Columnus, Ohio: J. and H. Miller. pp. 154–155. ISBN 978-0-312-27288-3.
- Buckingham, J.S. (28 March 1835). James S. Buckingham (ed.). The Athenæum. Vol. 387. London: J. Francis.
- Bülau, Friedrich (1860). Geheime Geschichten und räthselhafte Menschen, Sammlung verborgener oder vergessener Merkwürdigkeiten. Vol. 12. Leipzig: Brockhaus.
- Burns, William E. (2003). Witch Hunts in Europe and America: An Encyclopedia. Westport, Connecticut: Greenwood Publishing Group. ISBN 978-0-313-32142-9.
- Calvert, James; Rowe, George S. (1858). Fiji and the Fijians: Mission history. Vol. 2. London: A. Heylin.
- Cameron, Scott; Sela, Ron, eds. (2010). Islamic Central Asia: An Anthology of Historical Sources. Bloomington, Indiana: Indiana University Press. ISBN 978-0-253-35385-6.
- Carey, William (April 1814). J. Hooper (ed.). "Burning a leper to death". Evangelical Magazine and Missionary Chronicle. 22. London: Williams & Son.
- Carr, Matthew (2009). Blood and Faith: The Purging of Muslim Spain. New York: The New Press. ISBN 978-1-59558-361-1.
- Carvacho, René M. (2004). La Inquisición de Lima: signos de su decadencia, 1726–1750. LOM Ediciones. ISBN 978-956-282-708-9.
- De las Casas, Bartolomé (1974). The Devastation of the Indies: A Brief Account. JHU Press. ISBN 978-0-8018-4430-0.
- Braithwaite, John (1729). The history of the revolutions in the empire of Morocco. London, UK: Knapton and Betterworth.
- Cipolla, Gaetano (2005). Siciliana: Studies on the Sicilian Ethos. Mineola, New York: Legas. ISBN 978-1-881901-45-7.
- Collins, Roger (2004). Visigothic Spain 409–711. Oxford: Blackwell Publishing. ISBN 0-631-18185-7.
- Coward, D.A; Dynes, Wayne R.; Donaldson, Stephen (1992). "Attitudes to Homosexuality in Eighteenth Century France". History of Homosexuality in Europe and America. Taylor & Francis. ISBN 978-0-8153-0550-7.
- Croft, J.Pauline (2003). King James. Basingstoke and New York: Palgrave Macmillan. ISBN 0-333-61395-3.
- Crawford, Paul, ed. (2003). The 'Templar of Tyre': Part III of the 'Deeds of the Cypriots'. Aldershot, England: Ashgate Publishing, Ltd. p. 149. ISBN 978-1-84014-618-9.
- Crompton, Louis (2006). Homosexuality and Civilization. Boston: Harvard University Press. ISBN 978-0-674-03006-0.
- Cummins, Thomas; Cole, Martin W.; Zorach, Rebecca (2009). "The Golden Calf in America". The Idol in the Age of Art: Objects, Devotions and the Early Modern World. Burlington, Vermont: Ashgate Publishing, Ltd. p. 99. ISBN 978-0-7546-5290-8.
- Das, Sukla (1977). Crime and Punishment in Ancient India: (C. A.D. 300 to A.D. 1100). Abhinav Publications. ISBN 978-81-7017-054-9.
- Decker, Roy (2001). "Religion of Carthage". About.com. Archived from the original on 15 March 2009.
- Dietze, Karl H. (July 1995). "1804, der letzte Scheiterhaufen lohte im Kreis Eisenach". StadtZeit.Stadtjournal mit Informationen aus dem Wartburgkreis. Eisenach: MFB-Verlagsgesellschaft, Frisch: 24.
- Digby, Kenelm H. (1853). Compitum, Or The Meeting of the Ways at the Catholic Church. Vol. 3. London: C. Dolman. ISBN 978-0-8370-8501-2.
- DuBois, W.E.B. (July 1916). "The Waco Horror" (PDF). The Crisis. 12 (Supplement to no. 3). Archived by the Modernist Journals Project: 1–8.
- Dumas, Alexandre (1843). Celebrated crimes. London: Chapman and Hall.
- Durso, Keith E. (2007). No Armor for the Back: Baptist Prison Writings, 1600s–1700s. Macon, Georgia: Mercer University Press. ISBN 978-0-88146-091-9.
- Encyclopaedia Perthensis; or, Universal Dictionary of the Arts, Sciences, Literature, &c. Vol. 20. Edinburgh: John Brown, Anchor Close. 1816.
- Eaton, Richard M. (2005). A Social History of the Deccan, 1300–1761: Eight Indian Lives. Vol. 1. Cambridge: Cambridge University Press. ISBN 978-0-521-25484-7.
- Eraly, Abraham (2011). The First Spring: The Golden Age of India. New Delhi: Penguin Books India. ISBN 978-0-670-08478-4.
- Feek, Belinda (24 January 2011). "Burnt body victim named as search goes offshore". Waikato Times.
- Ferrier, Ronald W. (1996). A Journey To Persia. London: I.B. Tauris. ISBN 978-1-85043-564-8.
- Foxe, John; Townsend, George; Cattley, Stephen R. (1838). The Acts and Monuments of John Foxe: A New and Complete Edition. Vol. 5. London: R. B. Seeley and W. Burnside.
- Foxe, John; Milner, John; Cobbin, Ingram (1856). Foxe's book of martyrs: a complete and authentic account of the lives, sufferings, and triumphant deaths of the primitive and Protestant martyrs in all parts of the world, with notes, comments and illustrations. London: Knight and Son. pp. 608–609.
- França, Ronaldo. "Como na Chicago de Capone". Veja on-line (30 January 2002). Archived from the original on 15 October 2007.
- Fraser, Antonia (1997). Faith and Treason: The Story of the Gunpowder Plot. Anchor Books. ISBN 978-0-385-47190-9.
- Garrard-Burnett, Virginia (2010). Terror in the Land of the Holy Spirit: Guatemala Under General Efrain Rios Montt 1982–1983. Oxford: Oxford University Press. ISBN 978-0-19-537964-8.
- Gilbert, John T., ed. (2012). Chartularies of St Mary's Abbey, Dublin: With the Register of Its House at Dunbrody, and Annals of Ireland. Vol. 2. Cambridge: Cambridge University Press. ISBN 978-1-108-05224-5.
- Gräff, Heinrich (1834). Sammlung sämmtlicher Verordnungen, welche bis Ende 1833 in den von Kamptz'schen Jahrbüchern für Preußische Gesetzgebung enthalten sind. Vol. 7. Breslau: Georg Philipp Aderholz.
- Grellet, Fábio (24 May 2010). "Autorizado a visitar família, condenado por morte de Tim Lopes foge da prisão". Folha de S.Paulo (in Portuguese). Rio de Janeiro.
- Grote, George (2013). History of Greece. London: Routledge. ISBN 978-1-134-59378-1.
- Haldon, John (1997). Byzantium in the Seventh Century: The Transformation of a Culture. Cambridge: Cambridge University Press. ISBN 978-0-521-31917-1.
- Hamilton, Janet; Hamilton, Bernard; Stoyanov, Yuri (1998). Christian Dualist Heresies in the Byzantine World, C. 650-c. 1450: Selected Sources. Manchester: Manchester University Press. ISBN 978-0-7190-4765-7.
- Hahn, C-G.L. (1966). "The Ovambo". The Native Tribes of South West Africa. Abingdon: Frank Cass and Company Limited. pp. 1–37. ISBN 0-7146-1670-2.
- Heng, Geraldine (2013). Empire of Magic: Medieval Romance and the Politics of Cultural Fantasy. New York: Columbia University Press. ISBN 978-0-231-50067-8.
- Herden, Ralph B. (2005). Roter Hahn und Rotes Kreuz: Chronik der Geschichte des Feuerlösch- und Rettungswesens; von den syphonari der römischen Kaiser über die dienenden Brüder der Hospitaliter-Ritterorden bis zu Feuerwehren und Katastrophenschutz, Sanitäts- und Samariterdiensten in der ersten Hälfte des 20. Jahrhunderts. Norderstedt: BoD Books on Demand. ISBN 978-3-8334-2620-9.
- Hermann, Heinrich L. (1818). Kurze Geschichte des Criminal-Prozesses wider den Brandstifter Johann Christoph Peter Horst, und dessen Geliebte, die unverehelichte Friederike Louise Christiane Delitz. Berlin.
- Hirschberg, H.Z. (1981). A history of the Jews in North Africa: From the Ottoman conquests to the present time. Vol. 2. Leyden: Brill. ISBN 978-90-04-06295-5.
- Hoey, Edwin (June 1974). "Terror in New York – 1741". American Heritage. 25 (4). ISSN 0002-8738.
- Hofmann, Tom (2013). Benjamin Ferencz, Nuremberg Prosecutor and Peace Advocate. Jefferson, North Carolina: McFarland. ISBN 978-0-7864-7493-6.
- Hogg, Gary (1980). Cannibalism & Human Sacrifice. Coles. ISBN 978-0-7740-2925-4.
- Hogge, Alice (2005). God's Secret Agents: Queen Elizabeth's Forbidden Priests and the Hatching of the Gunpowder Plot. London: Harper Collins. ISBN 0-00-715637-5.
- Hübner, Lorenz (7 August 1804). "Eisenach, den 15ten July". Kurpfalzbaierische Gnädigst Priviligierte Münchner Staats-Zeitung. 5 (185). Munich: Kurpfb. Münchner Zeitungs-Comptoir: 760.
- Hunter, W.W (2013). The Indian Empire: Its People, History and Products. London: Routledge. ISBN 978-1-136-38301-4.
- Ikram, S.M.; Embree, Ainslie T. (1964). "Economic and Social Developments under the Mughals". Muslim Civilization in India. New York: Columbia University Press. ISBN 978-0-231-02580-5.
- John, Barbara; Pope, Robert (2003). "An Examination of the Origins and Development of the Legend of the Jewish Mass Poisoner". Honouring the Past and Shaping the Future: Religious and Biblical Studies in Wales: Essays in Honour of Gareth Lloyd Jones. Leominster: Gracewing Publishing. ISBN 978-0-85244-401-6.
- Julius Caesar, Gaius; McDevitt; Bohn (1851). Cæsar's commentaries on the Gallic and civil wars. London: Henry G. Bohn.
- Kamen, Henry (1999). The Spanish Inquisition: A Historical Revision. Boston: Yale University Press. ISBN 978-0-300-07880-0.
- Kanina, Wangui (21 May 2008). "Mob burns to death 11 Kenyan 'witches'". Reuters.
- Kantor, Mattis (1993). The Jewish Time Line Encyclopedia: A Year-by-Year History From Creation to the Present. Lanham, Maryland: Jason Aronson, Incorporated. ISBN 978-1-4616-3149-1.
- Kantor, Máttis (2005). Codex Judaica: Chronological Index of Jewish History, Covering 5,764 Years of Biblical, Talmudic & Post-Talmudic History. Zichron Press. ISBN 978-0-9670378-3-7.
- Klein, Samuel (1833). Handbuch der Geschichte von Ungarn und seiner Verfaßung. Leipzig: Wigand.
- Koch, Johann C. (1824). Hals-oder peinliche Gerichtsordnung Kaiser Carls V. Marburg: Krieger.
- Kurth, Peter (12 November 2002). ""Out of the Flames" by Lawrence and Nancy Goldstone". Salon. Archived from the original on 23 October 2011.
- Kyle, Donald G. (2002). Spectacles of Death in Ancient Rome. London: Routledge. ISBN 978-0-203-00635-1.
- Landucci, Luca; Jarvis, Alice de Rosen (1927). A Florentine diary from 1450 to 1516. London: J.M. Dent & Sons, Ltd.
- Lattimer, Mark (13 December 2007). "Freedom Lost". The Guardian.
- de La Vega, Garcilaso; Rycaut, Paul (1688). The Royal Commentaries of Peru. London: Christopher Wilkinson. pp. 216–217.
- de Ledrede, Richard; Wright, Thomas (1843). A Contemporary Narrative of the Proceedings Against Dame Alice Kyteler, Prosecuted for Sorcery in 1324, by Richard de Ledrede, Bishop of Ossory. London: The Camden Society.
- de Ledrede, Richard; Davidson, Sharon; Ward, John (2004). The Sorcery Trial of Alice Kyteler: A Contemporary Account (1324). Asheville, North Carolina: Pegasus Press. ISBN 978-1-889818-42-9.
- Lee, Samuel (2010). Rediscovering Japan, Reintroducing Christendom: Two Thousand Years of Christian History in Japan. Lanham, Maryland: Hamilton Books. ISBN 978-0-7618-4950-6.
- Lithgow, William (1814). Travels & Voyages Through Europe, Asia, and Africa, for Nineteen Years. London: Longman, Hurst, Rees, Orme&Brown.
- McCullough, David W. (8 October 2000). "The Fairy Defense". The New York Times.
- McLynn, Frank (2013). Crime and Punishment in Eighteenth Century England. London: Routledge. ISBN 978-1-136-09308-1.
- McManus, Edgar J. (1973). Black Bondage in the North. Syracuse, New York: Syracuse University Press. ISBN 978-0-8156-2893-4.
- Manu (1825). Haughton; Graves C. (eds.). The Institutes of Menu. Vol. 2. London: Cox and Baylis.
- Markoe, Glenn (2000). Phoenicians. Berkeley, Los Angeles: University of California Press. ISBN 978-0-520-22614-2.
- Matar, Nabil I. (2013). Europe Through Arab Eyes, 1578–1727. New York: Columbia University Press. ISBN 978-0-231-51208-4.
- Matsumoto, Dianna (2009). The Soul of a Nation: Japan's Destiny. Garden City, New York: Morgan James Publishing. ISBN 978-1-60037-553-8.
- Miley, John (1843). Rome, as it was Under Paganism, and as it Became Under the Popes, Volume 1. London: J. Madden. pp. 223–224.
- Miller, John (1972). Popery and Politics in England 1660–1688. Cambridge: Cambridge University Press. ISBN 978-0-521-20236-7.
- Mittra, Sangh; Kumar, Bachchan (2004). Encyclopaedia of Women in South Asia: Nepal. Vol. 6. Gyan Publishing House. ISBN 978-81-7835-193-3.
- Mooney, John A. (1919). Joan of Arc. New York: Encyclopedia Press, Incorporated.
- Mooney, John A.; Patterson, Gail (2002). "From Domremy to Chinon". Joan of Arc: Historical Overview and Bibliography. Hauppauge, New York: Nova Publishers. ISBN 978-1-59033-503-1.
- Moryson, Fynes; Hadfield, Andrew (2001). "Fynes Moryson, An Itinerary (1617)". Amazons, Savages, and Machiavels. Oxford: Oxford University Press. pp. 166–179. ISBN 978-0-19-871186-5.
- Murphy, Cullen (2012). God's Jury: The Inquisition and the making of the Modern World. New York: Houghton Mifflin Harcourt. ISBN 978-0-618-09156-0.
- Nassau, George R. S. (1824). Catalogue of the ... library of ... George Nassau, which will be sold by auction, by mr. Evans, Feb. 16. p. 17.
- Oehlschlaeger, Emil (1866). Posen. Kurz gefasste Geschichte und Beschreibung der Stadt Posen. Posen: Louis Merzbach.
- Olmstead, Albert Ten Eyck (February 1918). "Assyrian Government of Dependencies". The American Political Science Review. 12, 1 (1). American Political Science Association: 63–77. doi:10.2307/1946342. hdl:2027/njp.32101058862515. ISSN 0003-0554. JSTOR 1946342. S2CID 147325803.
- Osenbrüggen, Eduard (1854). Die brandstiftung in den strafgesetzbüchern Deutschlands und der deutschen Schweiz. Leipzig: J.G. Hinrich.
- Osenbrüggen, Eduard (1860). Das alamannische Strafrecht im deutschen Mittelalter. Schaffhausen: Hurter.
- O'Shea, Kathleen A. (1999). Women and the Death Penalty in the United States, 1900–1998. Westport, Connecticut: Greenwood Publishing Group. ISBN 978-0-275-95952-4.
- Pagán, Victoria (2012). Conspiracy Theory in Latin Literature. Austin, Texas: University of Texas Press. ISBN 978-0-292-74979-5.
- Paige, Jeffery M (November 1983). "Social Theory and Peasant Revolution in Vietnam and Guatemala" (PDF). Theory and Society. 12 (6): 699–737. doi:10.1007/bf00912078. hdl:2027.42/43640. ISSN 0304-2421. S2CID 141234746.
- Pasachoff, Naomi E.; Littman, Robert J. (2005). A Concise History of the Jewish People. Lanham, Maryland: Rowman & Littlefield. ISBN 978-0-7425-4366-9.
- Pavlac, Brian A. (2009). Witch Hunts in the Western World: Persecution and Punishment from the Inquisition Through the Salem Trials. Westport, Connecticut: ABC-CLIO. ISBN 978-0-313-34873-0.
- Peletz, Michael G. (2002). Islamic Modern: Religious Courts and Cultural Politics in Malaysia. Princeton, New Jersey: Princeton University Press. ISBN 978-0-691-09508-0.
- Perckmayr, Reginbald (1738). Geschichte und Predig-Buch. Vol. 2. Augsburg: Martin Veith.
- Peter from Mladanovic (2003). "How was executed Jan Hus". Newyorske listy. ISSN 1093-2887. Archived from the original on 6 March 2013.
- Pharr, Clyde (2001). The Theodosian Code. Union, New Jersey: The Lawbook Exchange, Ltd. ISBN 978-1-58477-146-3.
- Pickett, Brent L. (2009). The A to Z of Homosexuality. Lanham, Maryland: Scarecrow Press. ISBN 978-0-8108-7072-7.
- Pluskowski, Aleksander (2013). The Archaeology of the Prussian Crusade: Holy War and Colonisation. London: Routledge. ISBN 978-1-136-16281-7.
- Prager, Dennis; Telushkin, Joseph (2007). Why the Jews?: The Reason for Antisemitism. New York: Touchstone. ISBN 978-1-4165-9123-8.
- Puff, Helmut; Bennett, Judith M.; Karras, Ruth M. (2013). "Same Sex Possibilities". The Oxford Handbook of Women and Gender in Medieval Europe. Oxford: Oxford University Press. ISBN 978-0-19-958217-4.
- Quint, Emmanuel B. (2005). A Restatement of Rabbinic Civil Law. Vol. 10. Jerusalem: Gefen Publishing House Ltd. ISBN 978-965-229-323-7.
- Radbruch, Gustav (1992). "Abbau des Strafrechts. Bemerkungen über den Entwurf 1925 mit Anmerkungen über den Entwurf 1927". Gesamtausgabe, Band 9: Strafrechtsreform. Heidelberg: C.F. Müller. pp. 246–252. ISBN 978-3-8114-5091-2.
- Rapley, Robert (2001). A Case of Witchcraft: The Trial of Urbain Grandier. McGill-Queen's Press – MQUP. ISBN 978-0-7735-2312-8.
- Reeder, Caryn A. (2012). The Enemy in the Household: Family Violence in Deuteronomy and Beyond. Grand Rapids, Michigan: Baker Books. ISBN 978-1-4412-3619-7.
- Richards, Jeffrey (2013). Sex, Dissidence and Damnation: Minority Groups in the Middle Ages. London: Routledge. ISBN 978-1-136-12700-7.
- Richards, William (1812). The History of Lynn: Civil, Ecclesiastical, Political, Commercial, Biographical, Municipal, and Military, from the Earliest Accounts to the Present Time. Vol. 2. Lynn: W. G. Whittingham.
- Roth, Mitchel (2010). Crime and Punishment: A History of the Criminal Justice System. Belmont, California: Cengage Learning. ISBN 978-0-495-80988-3.
- Rowland, Ingrid D. (2009). Giordano Bruno: Philosopher/Heretic. Chicago: University of Chicago Press. p. 10. ISBN 978-0-226-73024-0.
- Salomon, H.P.; Sassoon, I.S.D.; Saraiva, Antonio Jose (2001). "Appendix Four: The Portuguese Inquisition in Goa (India), 1561–1812". The Marrano Factory. The Portuguese Inquisition and Its New Christians, 1536–1765. Leyden: Brill. ISBN 978-90-04-12080-8.
- Sangvi, Vir (8 February 1999). "A Kill Before Dying". Rediff on the Net. Rediff.com.
- Sashi, S.S. (1996). Encyclopaedia Indica: India, Pakistan, Bangladesh. Vol. 100. Anmol Publications. ISBN 978-81-7041-859-7.
- Saunders, John J. (2001). The History of the Mongol Conquests. Philadelphia: University of Pennsylvania Press. ISBN 978-0-8122-1766-7.
- Sayles, George O. (17 February 1971). "King Richard II of England, A Fresh Look". Proceedings of the American Philosophical Society. 115, 1. Philadelphia: The American Philosophical Society: 28–32. ISBN 978-1-4223-7127-5. ISSN 0003-049X.
- Schneider, Tammi J. (2008). Mothers of Promise: Women in the Book of Genesis. Grand Rapids, Michigan: Baker Academic. ISBN 978-1-4412-0601-5.
- Schulte Nordholt, H.G.C. (2010). The Spell of Power: A History of Balinese Politics, 1650–1940. Leyden: Brill. ISBN 978-90-04-25375-9.
- Schwartz, Jeffrey; Houghton, Frank; Macchiarelli, Roberto; Bondioli, Luca (17 February 2010). "Skeletal Remains from Punic Carthage Do Not Support Systematic Sacrifice of Infants". PLOS ONE. 5 (2) e9177. Bibcode:2010PLoSO...5.9177S. doi:10.1371/journal.pone.0009177. PMC 2822869. PMID 20174667.
- Scott, George R. (2003) [1940]. History of Torture throughout the Ages. Kila, Montana/US: Kessinger Publishing Co. ISBN 978-0-7661-4063-9.
- Sharma, Pushpa; Srivastava, Vijay Shankar (1981). "The Military System of the Mongols". Cultural Contours of India: Dr. Satya Prakash Felicitation Volume. Abhinav Publications. p. 361. ISBN 978-0-391-02358-1.
- Shaw, Thomas (1757). Travels, or Observations relating to several parts of Barbary and the Levant. London, UK: Millar and Sandby. p. 253.
- Smirke, Edward (1865). "Extracts from original Records relating to the Burning of Lepers in the reign of Edward II". The Archaeological Journal. 22. London: Central Committee of the Archaeological Institute: 326–331. doi:10.1080/00665983.1865.10851326.
- Soukhorukov, Sergey (13 June 2004). "Train blast was 'a plot to kill North Korea's leader". The Daily Telegraph. Archived from the original on 11 January 2022.
- Springer, Alex (24 September 2008). "Der Letzte Feuer". Die Welt.
- St. Clair, William (2008) [1972]. That Greece Might Still Be Free (revised ed.). Cambridge: Open Book Publishers. ISBN 978-1-906924-00-3.
- Steel, Catherine (2013). The End of the Roman Republic 146 to 44 BC: Conquest and Crisis. Edinburgh: Edinburgh University Press. p. 98. ISBN 978-0-7486-1944-3.
- Stevens, George A. (1764). The Beauties of All Magazines Selected for the Year 1764 (including several Comic Pieces). Vol. 3. London: T. Waller.
- Stewart, Alan (2003). The Cradle King: A Life of James VI & 1. London: Chatto and Windus. ISBN 0-7011-6984-2.
- Stillman, Norman A. (1979). The Jews of Arab Lands: A History and Source Book. Jewish Publication Society. ISBN 978-0-8276-1155-9.
- Stillman, Yedida K.; Zucker, George K., eds. (1993). New Horizons in Sephardic Studies. Albany, New York: SUNY Press. ISBN 978-0-7914-1402-6.
- Sumner, William G. (2007). Folkways: A Study of Mores, Manners, Customs and Morals. New York: Cosimo, Inc. ISBN 978-1-60206-758-5.
- Suwurow, Victor (1995). GRU – Die Speerspitze: Was der KGB für die Polit-Führung, ist die GRU für die Rote Armee (3rd ed.). Solingen: Barett. ISBN 3-924753-18-0.
- Telchin, Stan (2004). Messianic Judaism is Not Christianity: A Loving Call to Unity. Chosen Books. ISBN 978-0-8007-9372-2.
- De Thévenot, Jean; Lovell, Archibald (1687). The Travels of Monsieur De Thevenot into The Levant. Vol. 1. London: Faithorne.
- Thurston, H. (1912). "Witchcraft". The Catholic Encyclopedia. New York: Robert Appleton Company.
- Tjernagel, N.S. (1974). "Patrick Hamilton: Precursor of the Reformation in Scotland". Wisconsin Lutheran Quarterly. 74. ISSN 0362-5648. Archived from the original on 7 July 2010.
- Trenchard-Smith, Margaret; Turner, Wendy (2010). "Insanity, Exculpation and Disempowerment in Byzantine Law". Madness in Medieval Law and Custom. Leiden: Brill. ISBN 978-90-04-18749-8.
- Tully, Miss (1817). Narrative of a ten years' residence at Tripoli in Africa. London: Henry Colburn.
- Waddell, Hope M. (1863). Twenty-nine years in the West Indies and Central Africa: a review of missionary work and adventure. 1829–1858. London: T. Nelson and sons. p. 19.
- Watson, Alan, ed. (1998). The Digest of Justinian. Vol. 4. Philadelphia: University of Pennsylvania Press. ISBN 978-0-8122-2036-0.
- Weinberger-Thomas, Catherine (1999). Ashes of Immortality: Widow-Burning in India. Chicago: University of Chicago Press. ISBN 978-0-226-88568-1.
- Weiss, Moshe (2004). A Brief History of the Jewish People. Lanham, Maryland: Rowman & Littlefield. ISBN 978-0-7425-4402-4.
- White, Jon M. (2011). Everyday Life in Ancient Egypt. Minneola, New York: Courier Dover Publications. ISBN 978-0-486-42510-8.
- Wiener, Margaret J. (1995). Visible and Invisible Realms: Power, Magic, and Colonial Conquest in Bali. Chicago: University of Chicago Press. ISBN 978-0-226-88582-7.
- Wilkinson, Toby (2011). The Rise and Fall of Ancient Egypt. London: Bloomsbury Publishing. ISBN 978-1-4088-1002-6.
- Willis-Bund, J.W. (1982). A Selection of Cases from the State Trials. Vol. II Part I. Trials for Treason (1660–1678). Cambridge: CUP Archive. ASIN B0029U3KWY.
- Wills, C.J. (1891). In the land of the lion and sun. p. 204. OL 7180554M.
- Wilson, David H. (1963) [original edition 1956]. King James VI & 1. London, UK: Jonathan Cape Ltd. ISBN 0-224-60572-0.
- Wilson, James Holbert. (1853). Temple bar, the city Golgotha, by a member of the Inner Temple. London: David Bogue. p. 4.
- Winroth, Anders; Müller, Wolfgang P.; Sommar, Mary E. (2006). "Neither Slave Nor Free:Theology and Law in Gratian's Thoughts on the Definition of Marriage and Unfree Persons". Medieval Church Law and the Origins of the Western Legal Tradition: A Tribute to Kenneth Pennington. CUA Press. ISBN 978-0-8132-1462-7.
- Woblers, Julien (1 September 1855). "Speech for the Amsterdam Anti Slavery Society, 19th July 1855". The Anti Slavery Reporter. 3. London: Peter Jones Bolton.
- Wood, Alan (2011). Russia's Frozen Frontier: A History of Siberia and the Russian Far East 1581–1991. London: Bloomsbury Academic. p. 44. ISBN 978-0-340-97124-6.
- Houtsma, M. (1987). Zurkhana, Taif (ed.). E.J. Brill's First Encyclopaedia of Islam 1913–1936. Vol. 8. Leyden: Brill. ISBN 978-90-04-08265-6.
- Yang, Anand A.; Sarkar, Sumit; Sarkar, Tanika (2008). "Whose Sati?Widow-Burning in early Nineteenth Century India". Women and Social Reform in Modern India: A Reader. Bloomington, Indiana: Indiana University Press. ISBN 978-0-253-35269-9.
- Zvi Gilat, Israel (2013). "Exegetical creativity in Interpreting Biblical Laws". In Lifshitz, Berachyahu (ed.). Jewish Law Annual. Vol. 20. London: Routledge. p. 62, footnote 73. ISBN 978-1-136-01376-8.
