= Friederike Luise Delitz =

Friederike "Luise" Christiane Delitz (c. 1791 – 28 May 1813) was a convicted Prussian arsonist. With her accomplice and co-defendant, Johann Peter Horst (1783–1813), she was the last person in Germany to be executed by burning. They were, however, according to Gustav Radbruch, secretly strangled just prior to being burnt, namely when their arms and legs were tied fast to the stake.

Delitz had a relationship with Horst, with whom she was arrested after a fire in Schöneberg in 1810. In August 1812, she stood trial for having been a part of a gang of eleven arsonists who were suspected of having caused 45 fires with 30 casualties around Brandenburg. Delitz and Horst were judged guilty and sentenced to be executed by burning. The verdict was carried out in Berlin on 28 May 1813.

The cause célèbre has been the subject of research and exhibitions.
