= Banker (ancient) =

Profession

The banker of ancient times was employed within financial activities, during the ancient Mesopotamian, ancient Greek and ancient Roman periods.

== Mesopotamia ==
While certain families of Mesopotamia might be thought of as banking families, according to one source, these families' economic activities were not banking proper. This is because the families charged the same for loans as they gave in interest on deposits, so accordingly, their situation with foreign enterprises was one in which they did not participate in arbitrage, in addition to the absence of an economic situation where-by credit provision might increase the quantity of specie (i.e. coins) present with individuals. The House of Egibi were such a family, living during the Neo-Babylonian and Persian periods, and the House of Murashu were another, living at a time during the 5th century BCE. In addition to these two, the Borsippa based family, Ea-iluta-bani, were also active during the Neo-Babylonia time-period and later. All three families are classified as merchant bankers by Nemet-Nejat.

Following the unification of the city-states in Assyria and Sumer by Sargon of Akkad into a single empire ruled from his home city circa 2334 BC, common Mesopotamian standards for length, area, volume, weight, and time used by artisan guilds in each city was promulgated by Naram-Sin of Akkad (c. 2254–2218 BC), Sargon's grandson, including for shekels. In December 1901 and January 1902, at the direction of archaeologist Jacques de Morgan, Father Jean-Vincent Scheil, OP found a 2.25 meter (or 88.5 inch) tall basalt or diorite stele in three pieces inscribed with 4,130 lines of cuneiform law dictated by Hammurabi (c. 1792–1750 BC) of the First Babylonian Empire in the city of Shush, Iran.

Code of Hammurabi Law 100 stipulated repayment of a loan by a debtor to a creditor on a schedule with a maturity date specified in written contractual terms. Laws 101 and 102 stipulated that a shipping agent, factor, or ship charterer was only required to repay the principal of a loan to their creditor in the event of a net income loss or a total loss due to an Act of God. Law 103 stipulated that an agent, factor, or charterer was by force majeure relieved of their liability for an entire loan in the event that the agent, factor, or charterer was the victim of theft during the term of their charterparty upon provision of an affidavit of the theft to their creditor.

Law 122 stipulated that a depositor of gold, silver, or other chattel/movable property for safekeeping must present all articles and a signed contract of bailment to a notary before depositing the articles with a banker, and Law 123 stipulated that a banker was discharged of any liability from a contract of bailment if the notary denied the existence of the contract. Law 124 stipulated that a depositor with a notarized contract of bailment was entitled to redeem the entire value of their deposit, and Law 125 stipulated that a banker was liable for replacement of deposits stolen while in their possession.

== Ancient Greece ==
In Ancient Greece the role today filled by bankers fell to the trapezites (Ancient Greek: τραπεζίται (trapezitai), singular trapezites, so-called from their use of τράπεζαι (trapezai), a type of table). Initially active during the 5th century BCE, the trapezitai provided a variety of services, primarily money-changing, providing interest-payments on deposited monies, pawnbrokering, acting as notaries, and the safe-guarding of valuables.

The earliest recorded trapezitai are known to have participated in private enterprise; in the first instance they were greatly reliant on transactions generated by money-changing activity, but they also accepted deposits and made and took payments from individuals.

Ancient Grecian bankers were in the first instance moneychangers (kollybistes) and pawnbrokers, who operated in the marketplace or at festival sites, changing the coinage of foreign merchants into local currency.

Many early bankers in Greek city-states belonged to the metic status. Money-lending was very often an activity for foreigners living as so-called outsiders within society. Trade and commercial activities were deemed wholly unsuited to the status and situation of the noble élite of society because these activities were allegedly a source of corruption; instead funds, and accordingly wealth, were obtained primarily by way of militancy, not by way of commerce.

The task of keeping the deposited wealth provided to the temple of Asklepios was often allotted to the neokoros or zakoros; or at Kos to the hierophylakes, who were also the record-keepers of such exchanges.

It was an established pattern of behaviour for a banker in Athens, Aigina and elsewhere, in the interests of the security of the assets entrusted to him, to have his wife wed his slave after his death, in that the slave had inherited his previous owner's bank upon his death.

=== Individual bankers ===
The first person to have participated in ancient society to some degree as a banker was named Philostephanos (of Corinth).

A slave named Pasion, for a time owned by Archestratos and Antisthenes, who were partners of a banking firm in Peiraieus, was for a time Athens' most important banker, after his manumission to the metic class. Pasion operated as a banker from 394 BCE to sometime during the 370s. His establishment was subsequently inherited by his own slave, Phormio.

The banker-slave Hermias, allegedly a eunuch, was manumitted by the banker Euboulos, and is attested to have behaved subsequently toward the lands of Assos and Atarneus somehow tyrannically. His adopted daughter married Aristotle, the circumstances of this marriage being arranged by Hermias himself.

== Ancient Roman ==
Early bankers were known primarily as Mensarii, Mensularii and Numularii, or argentarii. Additionally to a lesser extent individuals involved in financial activities were known as coactores, coactores argenterii, collectarii, and stipulatores argenterii. Bankers operated from either appointment by the government and so were tasked with collecting taxes, or instead operated independently. Accordingly, Mensarii were distinguished from argenterii by the fact of the former operating under state assistance while the latter participating on the basis of private enterprise. Argenterii evolved to provide the function of credit provision on a short-term basis for individuals at auctions.

Persons employed in the professional capacities of money-changing and assaying were known as argyramoiboi.

According to Callistratus, females were barred from activity as bankers by Roman law.

=== Individual bankers ===
L. Aemilius Papius, M. Atilius Regulus and M. Scribonius Libo were made a three mensarii commission during 216.

== See also ==
- Eubulus
- History of banking
- List of banking families
