= Education in ancient Greece =

Education for Greek people was vastly "democratized" in the 5th century B.C., influenced by the Sophists, Plato, and Isocrates. Later, in the Hellenistic period of Ancient Greece, education in a gymn school was considered essential for participation in Greek culture. The value of physical education to the ancient Greeks and Romans has been historically unique. There were two forms of education in ancient Greece: formal and informal. Formal education was attained through attendance to a public school or was provided by a hired tutor. Informal education was provided by an unpaid teacher and occurred in a non-public setting. Education was an essential component of a person's identity.

Formal Greek education was primarily for males and non-slaves. In some poleis, laws were passed to prohibit the education of slaves. The Spartans also taught music and dance, but with the purpose of enhancing their maneuverability as soldiers.

== Athenian systems ==
=== Classical Athens (508–322 BCE) ===
Elementary Education

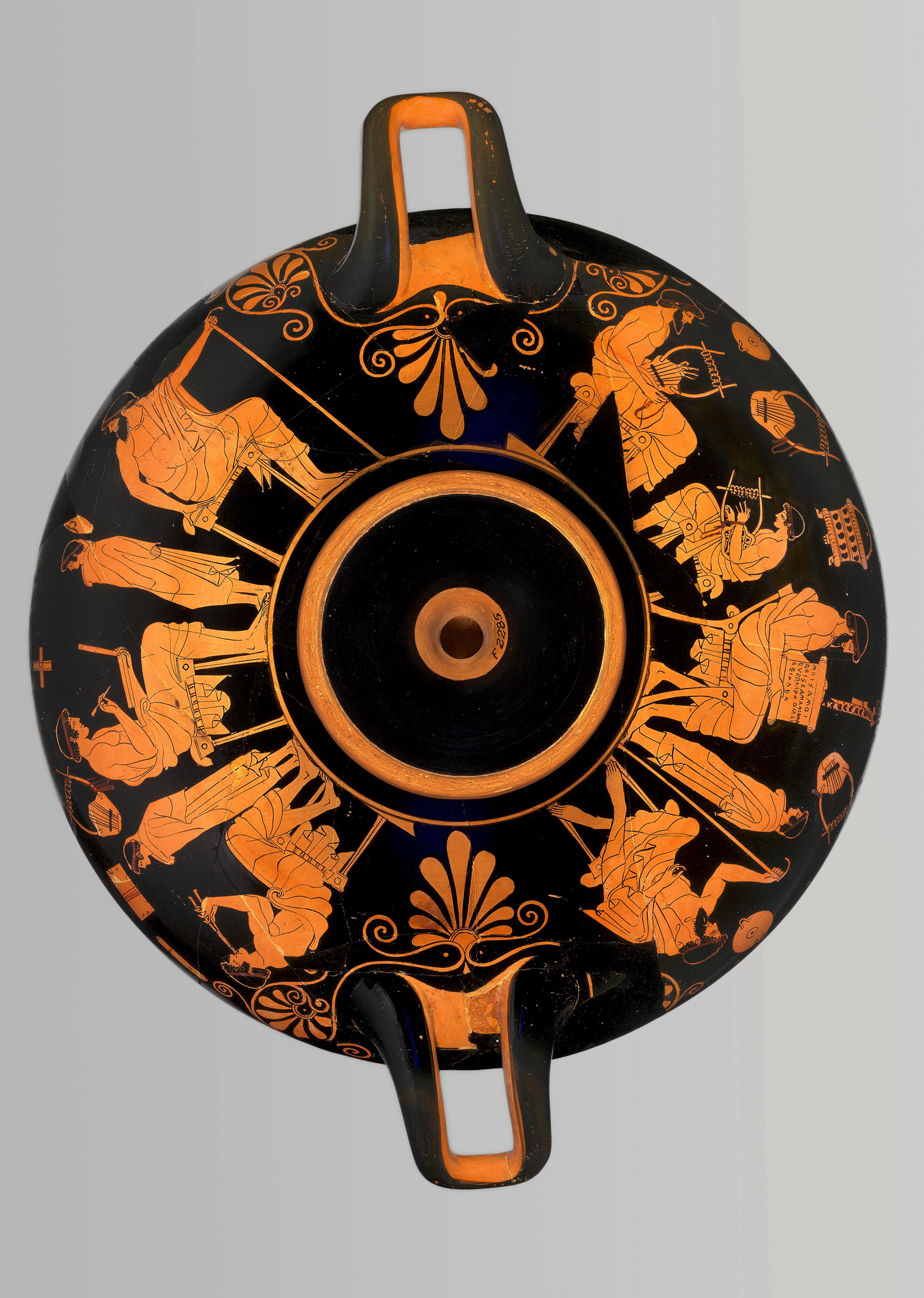
Painted on the famous Douris' Cup in around 480 BC, the depiction of educational scenes involving grammata and mousikē.

Elementary education had a long history in Athens as Aristophanes called it the arkhaia paideia (literally ancient education). But it was only fully developed in the early fifth century BC and attained its recognisable form. In its developed form, the old education consists of three divisions, gymnastikē or physical education, mousikē or music, and grammata or letters. The boys would attend the classes concurrently and there were separate teachers for each of the disciplines. Although it is similar to modern day elementary level study, this traditional education of the Athenian boys was neither mandatory nor free. The education came at a price and it was up to the fathers’ decision of what and how long the education would be. While the elementary education normally ended when the boys reached their adolescence at around 14 to 15 years old, children from wealthier families would start earlier and end later. Since education commonly ended in early adolescence, a large part of adolescent education was informal and relied on simple human experience.

Physical education

Among the three divisions, the physical education held the prestigious place. It was not because Athens needed her citizens to become competent warriors through physical training. Another institution, the ephebeia would deal with military training. There were two purposes of the sports education. One was to prepare the young boys for local and Panhellenic sports games. The other purpose was to cultivate a strong and beautiful body which was essential to Greek culture.

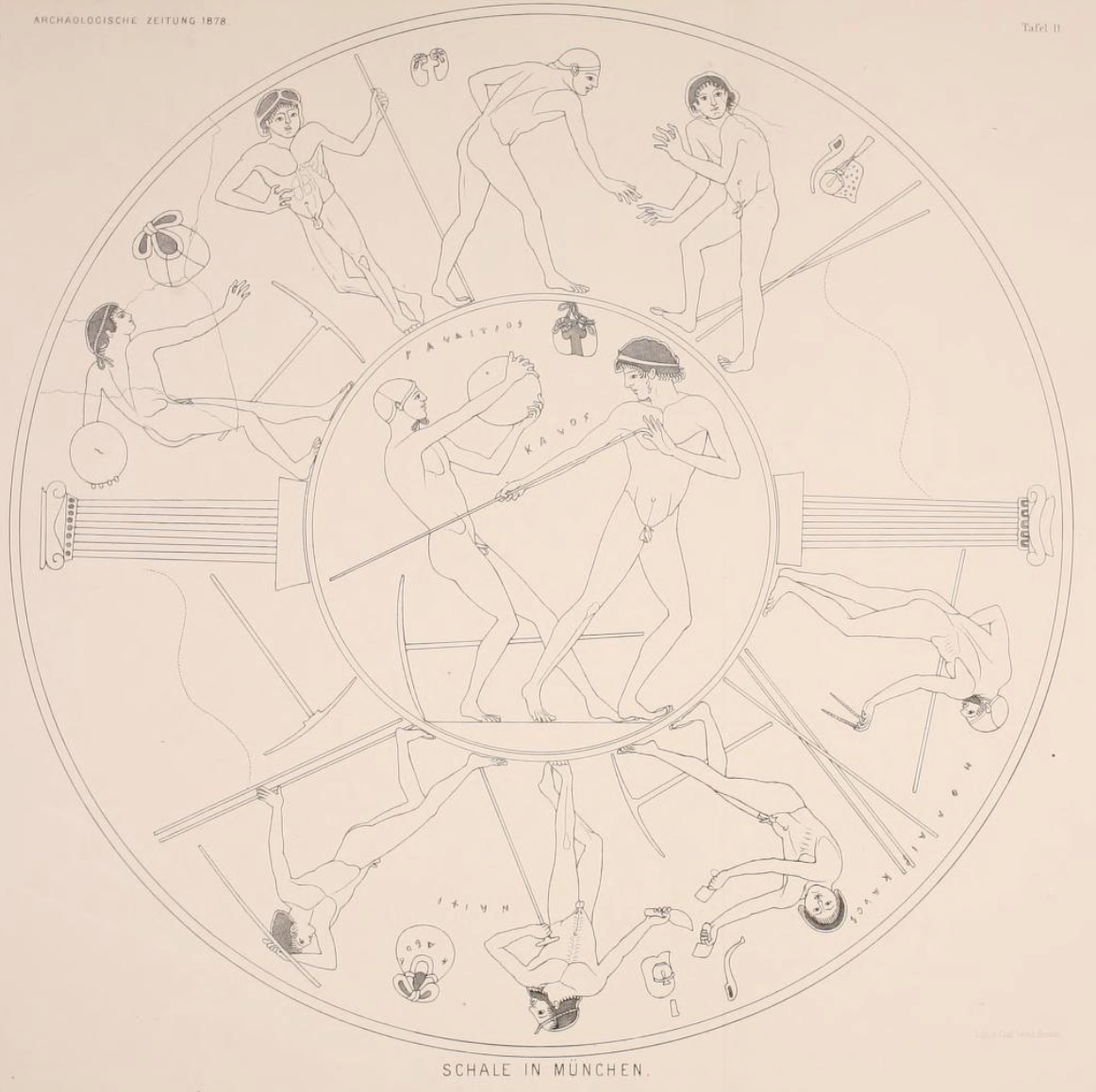
Depiction of athletic training in a palaestra.

The teacher of the physical education was called a paidotribēs. The paidotribēs was often a professional athlete himself. A main part of the training was the fighting arts, wrestling, boxing and pankration. Another important component of the training was the athletic sports, racing, discus and javelin throwing and long jump. The paidotribēs supervised and instructed the training in a privately owned palaistra. The famous Athenian public sports centre gymnasium was for the adult citizens. Little was known about how much the paidotribēs would actually charge. It could be very high as Athenaeus mentioned that a course could cost a mina. And a mina could afford the living of a four-people family in Athens for up to three months.

Music education

A kitharistēs (literally a player of the kithara, a stringed instrument like a lyre) was responsible for the music education. He would teach the students to play the kithara, to sing and compose lyric songs and to dance.

The education of music was an essential part of the old education. Plato asserted its parity with the sports. He stated that “gymnastics for the body and music for the soul.” By this, Plato meant the moral function of music and poetry. Aristophanes also emphasised the importance of musical education, stating that the boys would go to the music class “even if the snow is falling as thick as flour.” Given this importance, if one cannot play the lyre and sing in a choir, he was indeed uneducated at all. Accordingly, since the education was heavily charged, ignorance in music was also a symbol of lower socio-economical status.

Letter education

In order to take part in trade and politics, the demand of skills in reading and writing arose to become the third discipline of the old education. Hence, through the practical perspective, education in literacy was the most important among the three disciplines. If the father is not wealthy enough to send his son to attend all three classes, he will send him to a grammatistēs, a letter teacher.

The Athenian boys would study the following subjects at a grammatistēs, reading and writing, literature, and arithmetic. The boys would firstly engage in memorising the Greek letters. In the initial stages, they were required to recognize letters in short syllables. While they were familiarising with the alphabets, they started to write as well. Under the assistance of the grammatistēs, students would write with a stylus on a wax tablet as shown in the paintings on the Douris’ Cup. There is also a detailed written description of the process in Plato’s Protagoras:

...just as writing-masters first draw letters in faint outline with the pen for their less ad- vanced pupils, and then give them the copy-book and make them write according to the guidance of their lines,...

After the boys got some progress in the letters, they would proceed to the reading of the poets. Reciting poetry was very important to the adulthood life of the Athenians, especially those of Homer and Hesiod, whose works were highly regarded by the Athenians. Familiarity of Homer’s epic was the permit to the banquets for an educated Athenian man. Furthermore, this component of the syllabus served as another motivation for a poverished father sending his son to the grammatistēs. To learn the stories of the legendary heros by heart was critical to the Athenian identity.

==== Higher education ====
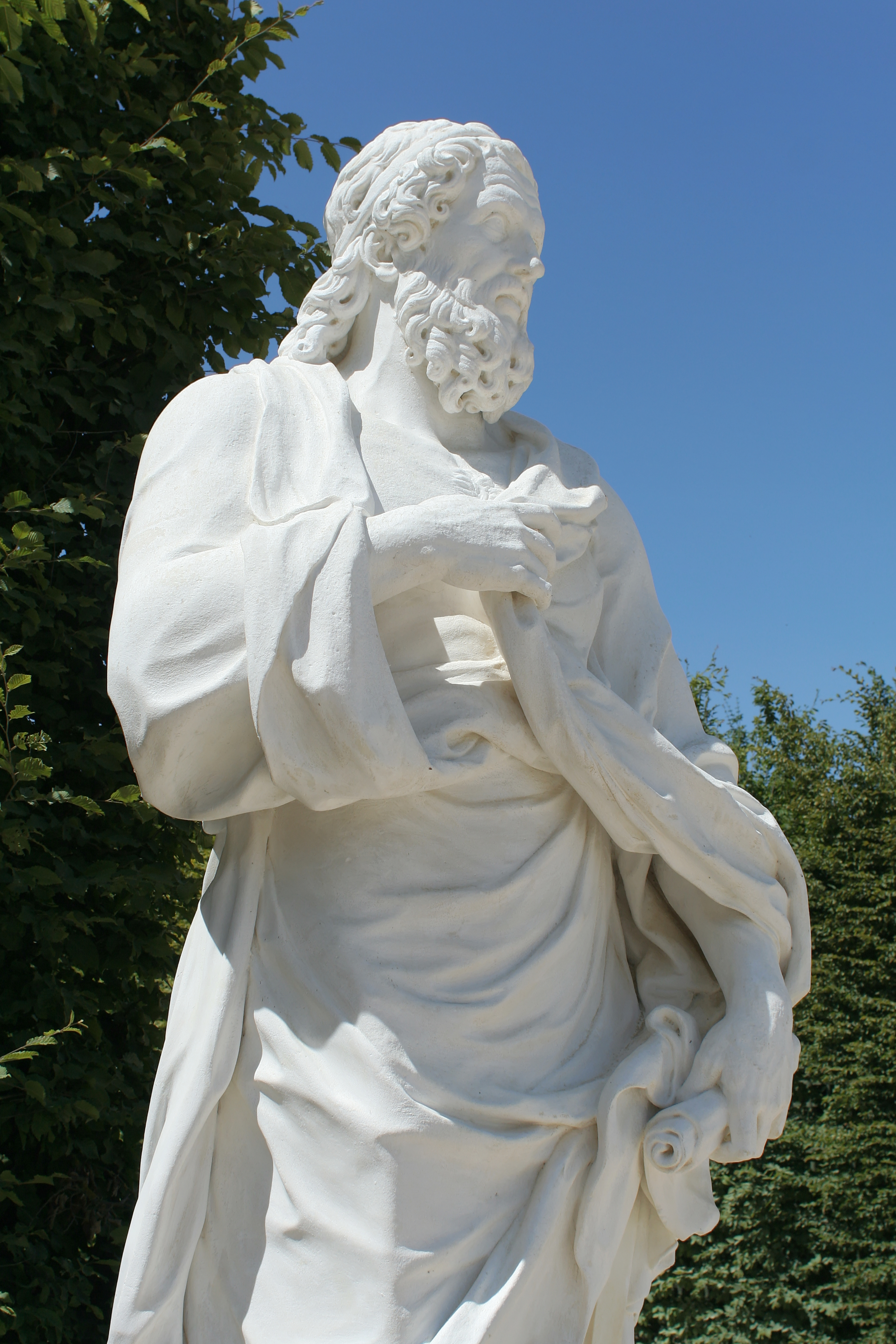
Isocrates sculpture located at the Parc de Versailles

The emergence of higher education in ancient Athens was the result of the so-called Sophists Reform happened in the latter half of the Fifth Century BC. It was a higher form of education compared to the old education. Although Freeman and Marrou proposed a classification within this Higher Education, secondary education and tertiary education, Beck refused the proposal. Nevertheless, there was a huge expansion in the subjects a student could learn, astronomy, philosophy, mathematics, rhetoric, history and grammar.

The sophists were professional teachers and most of them were foreigners, i.e. non-Athenians. They emerged because of the continuously growing need of higher knowledge than basic literacy and numeracy in the democratised Athens. The study normally took three to four years and the tuition fee was reasonable. For example, Protagoras charged a thousand drachma, which would be 10 mina. Despite all the branches of studies mentioned above, rhetoric, sometimes referred to as the “art of persuasion” ,was considered the most critical and fundamental part of the curriculum. This was primarily because mature skills of rhetoric bought the student a ticket to politics.

=== Education of Athenian Women ===
Women and girls in Athens did not participate in formal education. Most women remained at home throughout the majority of their lives, and any schooling that young girls did receive was the responsibility of their mothers and other female elders. While formal education taught boys physical education, letters, music and mathematics, it was a priority that girls learned to manage and take care of the home and family. Girls learned skills such as textile work, cleaning, maintaining the household, and taking care of the younger children in the family. They were also taught to manage a household staff.

There were certain conditions in which girls were expected to spend time away from the home. This included being sent on errands and attending religious events and ceremonies. Participating in religion was a way for women and girls to immerse themselves in their community and to learn about their culture. Religious Indoctrination rituals were said to have been important in teaching girls about their purpose, about what was expected of them, and about societal virtues and values that they should represent. Another significant part of girls' education, both inside and outside of religion, was education on bearing and raising children.

=== Classical Athenian educators ===
==== Isocrates (436–338 BC) ====
Isocrates was an influential classical Athenian orator. Growing up in Athens exposed Isocrates to educators such as Socrates and Gorgias at a young age and helped him develop exceptional rhetoric. As he grew older and his understanding of education developed, Isocrates disregarded the importance of the arts and sciences, believing rhetoric was the key to virtue. Education's purpose was to produce civic efficiency and political leadership and therefore, the ability to speak well and persuade became the cornerstone of his educational theory. However, at the time there was no definite curriculum for Higher Education, with only the existence of the sophists who were constantly traveling. In response, Isocrates founded his school of Rhetoric around 393 BCE. The school was in contrast to Plato's Academy (c. 387 BCE) which was largely based on science, philosophy, and dialectic.

==== Plato (428–348 BC) ====
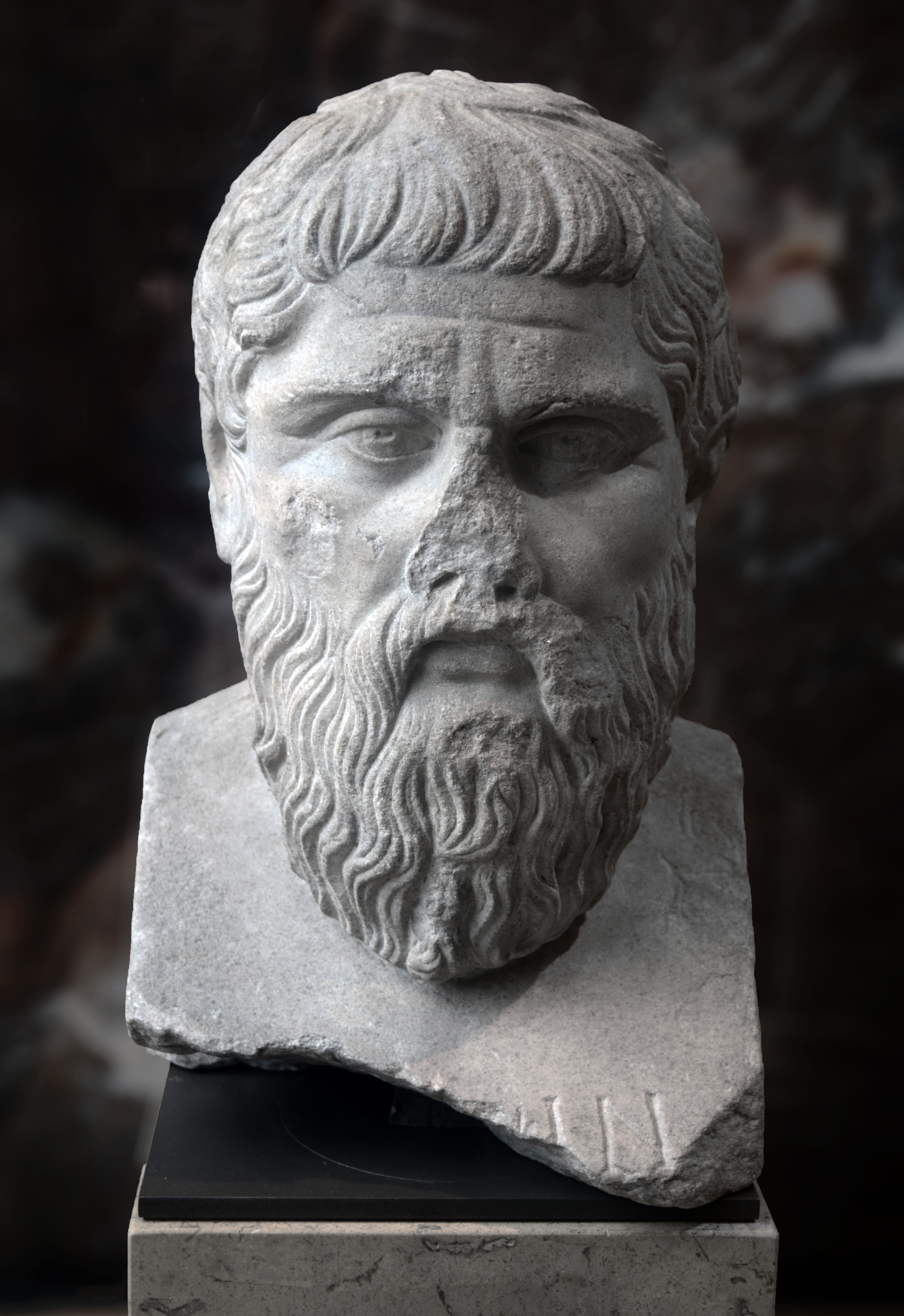
Plato bust on exhibition at The Louvre

Plato was a philosopher in classical Athens who studied under Socrates, ultimately becoming one of his most famed students. Following Socrates' execution, Plato left Athens in anger, rejecting politics as a career and traveling to Italy and Sicily. He returned ten years later to establish his school, the Academy (c. 387 BCE) – named after the Greek hero Akademos. Plato perceived education as a method to produce citizens who could operate as members of the civic community in Athens. In one sense, Plato believed Athenians could obtain education through the experiences of being a community member, but he also understood the importance of deliberate training, or Higher Education, in the development of civic virtue. Thus, his reasoning behind founding the academy – what is often credited as the first University.

It is at this school where Plato discussed much of his educational program, which he outlined in his best-known work – the Republic. In his writing, Plato describes the rigorous process one must go through in order to attain true virtue and understand reality for what it actually is. The education required of such achievement, according to Plato, included an elementary education in music, poetry, and physical training, two to three years of mandatory military training, ten years of mathematical science, five years of dialectic training, and fifteen years of practical political training. The few individuals equipped to reach such a level would become philosopher-kings, the leaders of Plato's ideal city.

==== Aristotle (384–322 BC) ====
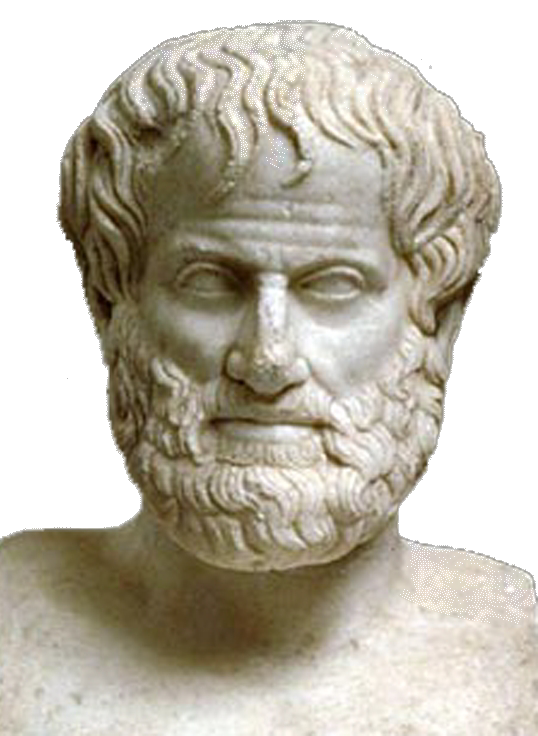
Bust of Aristotle

Aristotle was a classical Greek philosopher. While born in Stagira, Chalkidice, Aristotle joined Plato's Academy in Athens during his late teenage years and remained there until the age of thirty-seven, withdrawing following Plato's death. His departure from the academy also signalled his departure from Athens. Aristotle left to join Hermeias, a former student at the academy, who had become the ruler of Atarneus and Assos in the north-western coast of Anatolia (present-day Turkey). He remained in Anatolia until, in 342 BCE, he received an invitation from King Philip of Macedon to become the educator of his thirteen-year-old son Alexander. Aristotle accepted the invitation and moved to Pella to begin his work with the boy who would soon become known as Alexander the Great. When Aristotle moved back to Athens in 352 BCE, Alexander helped finance Aristotle's school – the Lyceum. A significant part of the Lyceum was research. The school had a systematic approach to the collection of information. Aristotle believed dialectical relationships among students performing research could impede the pursuit of truth. Thus, much of the school's focus was on research done empirically.

== Spartan system ==
Unlike Athens, the Spartan education is largely state-organised. The Spartan society desired that all male citizens become successful soldiers with the stamina and skills to defend their polis as members of a Spartan phalanx. It was a rumored by Plutarch, a Greek historian, that Sparta killed weak children. After examination, the council would either rule that the child was fit to live, or would reject the child, condemning him to death by abandonment and exposure.

=== Agoge ===
Military dominance was of extreme importance to the Spartans of Ancient Greece. In response, the Spartans structured their educational system as an extreme form of military boot camp, which they referred to as agoge. The pursuit of intellectual knowledge was seen as trivial, and thus academic learning, such as reading and writing, was kept to a minimum. A Spartan boy's life was devoted almost entirely to his school, and that school had but one purpose: to produce an almost indestructible Spartan phalanx. Formal education for a Spartan male began at about the age of seven when the state removed the boy from the custody of his parents and sent him to live in a barracks with many other boys his age. For all intents and purposes, the barracks was his new home, and the other males living in the barracks his family. For the next five years, until about the age of twelve, the boys would eat, sleep and train within their barracks unit and receive instruction from an adult male citizen who had completed all of his military training and experienced battle.

The instructor stressed discipline and exercise and saw to it that his students received little food and minimal clothing in an effort to force the boys to learn how to forage, steal and endure extreme hunger, all of which would be necessary skills in the course of a war. Those boys who survived the first stage of training entered into a secondary stage in which punishments became harsher and physical training and participation in sports almost non-stop in order to build up strength and endurance. During this stage, which lasted until the males were about eighteen years old, fighting within the unit was encouraged, mock battles were performed, acts of courage praised, and signs of cowardice and disobedience severely punished.

During the mock battles, the young men were formed into phalanxes to learn to maneuver as if they were one entity and not a group of individuals. To be more efficient and effective during maneuvers, students were also trained in dancing and music, because this would enhance their ability to move gracefully as a unit. Toward the end of this phase of the agoge, the trainees were expected to hunt down and kill a Helot, a Spartan slave. If caught, the student would be convicted and disciplined-not for committing murder, but for his inability to complete the murder without being discovered.

=== Ephebe ===
The students would graduate from the agoge at the age of eighteen and receive the title of ephebes. Upon becoming an ephebe, the male would pledge strict and complete allegiance to Sparta and would join a private organization to continue training in which he would compete in gymnastics, hunting and performance with planned battles using real weapons. After two years, at the age of twenty, this training was finished and the now-grown men were officially regarded as Spartan soldiers.

=== Education of Spartan women ===
Spartan women, unlike their Athenian counterparts, received a formal education that was supervised and controlled by the state. Much of the public schooling received by the Spartan women revolved around physical education. Until about the age of eighteen women were taught to run, wrestle, throw a discus, and also to throw javelins. The skills of the young women were tested regularly in competitions such as the annual footrace at the Heraea of Elis, In addition to physical education, the young girls also were taught to sing, dance, and play instruments often by traveling poets such as Alcman or by the elderly women in the polis. The Spartan educational system for females was very strict because its purpose was to train future mothers of soldiers in order to maintain the strength of Sparta's phalanxes, which were essential to Spartan defense and culture. The law of Lycurgus connected the physical fitness of women's bodies to strong, healthy offspring and ease during childbirth.

== Pythagoras and Pythagoreans ==
=== Pythagoras (570–490 BCE) ===
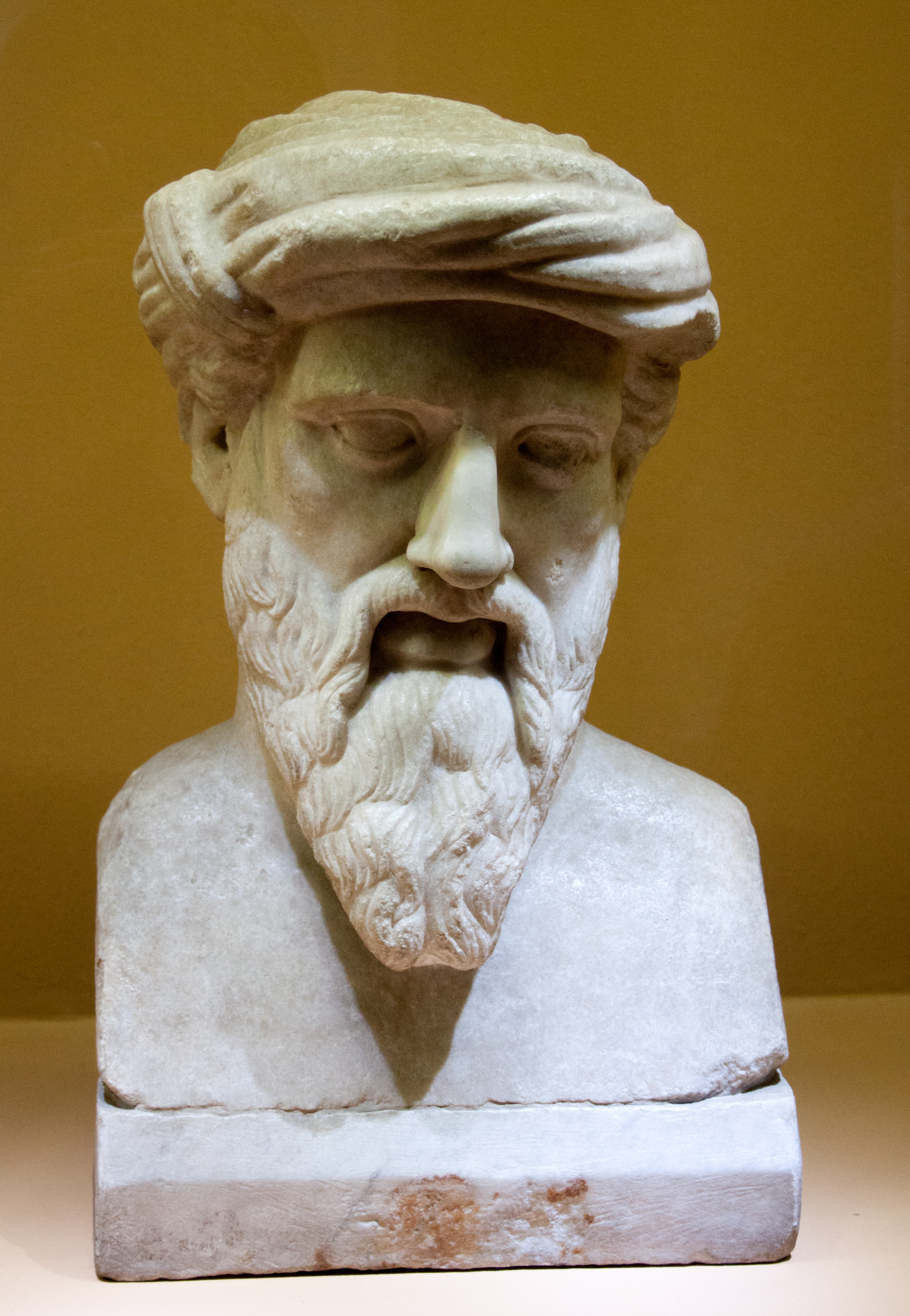
Bust of Pythagoras

Pythagoras was one of many Greek philosophers. He lived his life on the island Samos and is known for his contributions to mathematics. Pythagoras taught philosophy of life, religion, and mathematics in his own school in Kroton, which was a Greek colony. Pythagoras' school is linked to the Pythagorean theorem, which states that the square of the hypotenuse (the side opposite the right angle) is equal to the sum of the squares of the other two sides. The students of Pythagoras were known as Pythagoreans.

==== Pythagoreans ====
Pythagoreans followed a very specific way of life. They were famous for friendship, unselfishness, and honesty. The Pythagoreans also believed in a life after the current which drove them to be people who have no attachment to personal possessions everything was communal; they were also vegetarians. The people in a Pythagorean society were known as mathematikoi (μαθηματικοί, Greek for "learners").

==== Teachings ====
There are two forms that Pythagoras taught, Exoteric and Esoteric. Exoteric was the teaching of generally accepted ideas. These courses lasted three years for mathematikoi. Esoteric was teachings of deeper meaning. These teachings did not have a time limit. They were subject to when Pythagoras thought the student was ready. In Esoteric, students would learn the philosophy of inner meanings. The focus of Pythagoras in his Exoteric teachings were ethical teachings. Here, he taught the idea of the dependence of opposites in the world; the dynamics behind the balance of opposites.

Along with the more famous achievements, Pythagoreans were taught various mathematical ideas. They were taught the following: Pythagorean theorem, irrational numbers, five specific regular polygons, and that the earth was a sphere in the centre of the universe. Many people believed that the mathematical ideas that Pythagoras brought to the table allowed reality to be understood. Whether reality was seen as ordered or if it just had a geometrical structure. Even though Pythagoras has many contributions to mathematics, his most known theory is that things themselves are numbers. Pythagoras has a unique teaching style. He never appeared face to face to his students in the Exoteric courses. Pythagoras would set a current and face the other direction to address them. The students upon passing their education become initiated to be disciples. Pythagoras was much more intimate with the initiated and would speak to them in person. The specialty taught by Pythagoras was his theoretical teachings. In the society of Crotona, Pythagoras was known as the master of all science and brotherhood.

==== Rules of the school ====
Unlike other education systems of the time, men and women were allowed to be Pythagorean. The Pythagorean students had rules to follow such as: abstaining from beans, not picking up items that have fallen, not touching white chickens, could not stir the fire with iron, and not looking in a mirror that was beside a light.

==== Mathematics and music ====
Some of Pythagoras's applications of mathematics can be seen in his musical relationship to mathematics. The idea of proportions and ratios. Pythagoreans are known for formulating numerical concords and harmony. They put together sounds by the plucking of a string. The fact that the musician meant to pluck it at a mathematically expressible point. However, if the mathematical proportion between the points on the string were to be broken, the sound would become unsettled.

==== School's dictum ====
The Pythagorean school had a dictum that said All is number. This means that everything in the world had a number that described them. For instance, number 6 is the number that relates to creation, number 5 is the number that relates to marriage, number 4 is the number that relates to justice, number 3 is the number that relates to harmony, number 2 is the number that relates to opinion, and number 1 is the number that relates to reason.

Pythagorean Society was very secretive, the education society was based around the idea of living in peace and harmony, but secretly. Due to the education and society being so secretive, not much is known about the Pythagorean people.

== See also ==
- Scholarch
- Gymnasiarch
- Lyceum
