= Pythias =

Greek biologist and embryologist

Pythias (/ˈpɪθiəs/; Greek: Πυθιάς, romanized: Pūthiás), also known as Pythias the Elder, was the adopted daughter of Hermias, ruler of the cities Assos and Atarneus on the Anatolian coast opposite the island of Lesbos. She was also Aristotle's first wife. Hermias was an enemy of Persia and allied with Macedonia. In his will, Aristotle ordered that he be buried next to his wife; from his wording, it is known that Pythias was already dead by the time he wrote it.

== Personal life and family ==
While Pythias' date of birth is unclear, she was active around 355 BC and she died in Athens sometime after 330 BC. Sources about the familial relationship between Pythias and Hermias provide contradictory information. The doxographer Aristocles of Messene, a Peripatetic philosopher, defended Aristotle from slander that claimed Pythias was both Hermias' adopted daughter and sister. Citing the text On Poets and Writers of the Same Name by the scholar Demetrius of Magnesia (1st century BCE), another doxographer, Diogenes Laertius writes that Pythias was either Hermias' niece or daughter. Strabo identifies her as the daughter of Hermias' brother. For chronological reasons, it is unlikely that she was Hermias' sister.

Information about the exact time of and motives behind the marriage also differ. Demetrius of Magnesia and Strabo report that Hermias himself gave Pythias to Aristotle as a bride; if this was the case their marriage would fall in the time period of Aristotle's stay in Assos (347-345/344). Aristocles portrays the matter differently: according to his information, Aristotle married Pythias only after the death of Hermias, who was captured and executed through subterfuge on the orders of the Persian King Artaxerxes III. The question of the motive behind the marriage depends upon its date. Aristotle's enemies insinuated that he only married Pythias as a way to ingratiate himself with her father; because of that, the wedding would have been held before the death of his father-in-law. However, defending Aristotle's marriage, Aristocles claims the wedding only occurred after Hermias' death, when the connection with the family of fallen rulers would offer no advantage whatsoever. Aristotle spoke out against Antipater in a letter: As justification for the marriage he pointed out his friendship with the executed Hermias, after whose death Pythias was left in an unfortunate situation. Whether or not the letter by Aristotle that Aristocles refers to was real is contested by researchers. It is only certain that nasty rumours circulated about the marriage of the philosopher.

Aristotle and Pythias had a daughter, Pythias the Younger, but it is uncertain whether or not she is the mother of his son Nicomachus; Diogenes Laertius, referencing Timaeus, reports that Herpyllis, who was supposedly Aristotle's partner after Pythias' death, was Nicomachus' mother. Athenaeus also reports this, citing Hermippus. Herpyllis is even said to have become the philosopher's second wife, however, the credibility of this information is dubious. A better source is the Will of Aristotle. From its contents it can be indirectly deduced that Pythias was Nicomachus' mother. Herpyllis, who was conspicuously and generously looked after by his Will, may have been a relative of Aristotle from Stagira, who lived in his household and therefore became a source of gossip for his enemies.

=== Pythias the Younger ===
Pythias the Younger married three times, but is also said to have predeceased her father. Her first husband was Nicanor, Aristotle's nephew by his sister Arimneste. According to Aristotle's will, Nicanor was to manage the family affairs until his son, Nicomachus, came of age. Pythias' second husband was Procles of Sparta. Pythias' third husband was Metrodorus, a physician; Diogenes Laertius relates that they had a son named Aristotle.
