= Nicomachus (disambiguation) =

Nicomachus (c. 60 – c. 120) was a mathematician and Pythagorean philosopher from Gerasa.

Nicomachus may also refer to:

- Nicomachus (mythology)
- Nicomachus (scribe) (c. 410 BC), scribe tasked with publishing the laws of Solon
- Nicomachus of Thebes (4th century BC), ancient Greek painter
- Nicomachus (father of Aristotle) (c. 375 BC), father of the philosopher Aristotle
- Nicomachus (son of Aristotle) (c. 325 BC), son of the philosopher Aristotle
- Nicomachus of Macedon, eromenos of Dimnus, conspirator against Alexander the Great
- Appius Nicomachus Dexter (fl. before 432), politician of the Western Roman Empire
- Gaius Asinius Nicomachus Julianus (born c. 185), Proconsul in Asia in the 3rd century
- Rufius Petronius Nicomachus Cethegus (fl. 504–558, politician of Ostrogothic Italy and the Eastern Roman Empire

== See also ==
- Nicomachus Flavianus (disambiguation)
- Nicomachus theorem
- Nicomachean Ethics
- Nichomachus
