= Herpyllis =

Aristotle's concubine

Herpyllis of Stagira (Greek: Ἑρπυλλίς) was Aristotle's companion and lover after his wife, Pythias, died. It is unclear whether she was a free woman (as it appears in the surviving Greek version of Aristotle's will) or a servant (as in the Arabic version).

Together Aristotle and Herpyllis had a son, named Nicomachus after Aristotle's father. Nicomachus was quite young when Aristotle wrote his will, as can be seen from the fact that Nicanor, Aristotle's nephew by his sister Arimneste, was appointed guardian until Nicomachus came of age.

It is possible that Herpyllis may have been Aristotle's wife, as Eusebius states that they were married. In his will, Aristotle ensured that Herpyllis was provided for, in return for her goodness to him. These provisions stated that if she wished to be married, the trustees of his estate should ensure that she was married to a worthy man. If, however, she did not wish to marry, the will granted her residence in his house in Stagira, and ordered that it be furnished according to her wishes. Additionally, he left her a bequest of money.
