= Trapezites =

Trapezites may refer to:

- Trapezites (butterfly), a genus of butterflies endemic to Australia
- Trapezite, the ancient word for a banker in Greece
