= Poverty in ancient Rome =

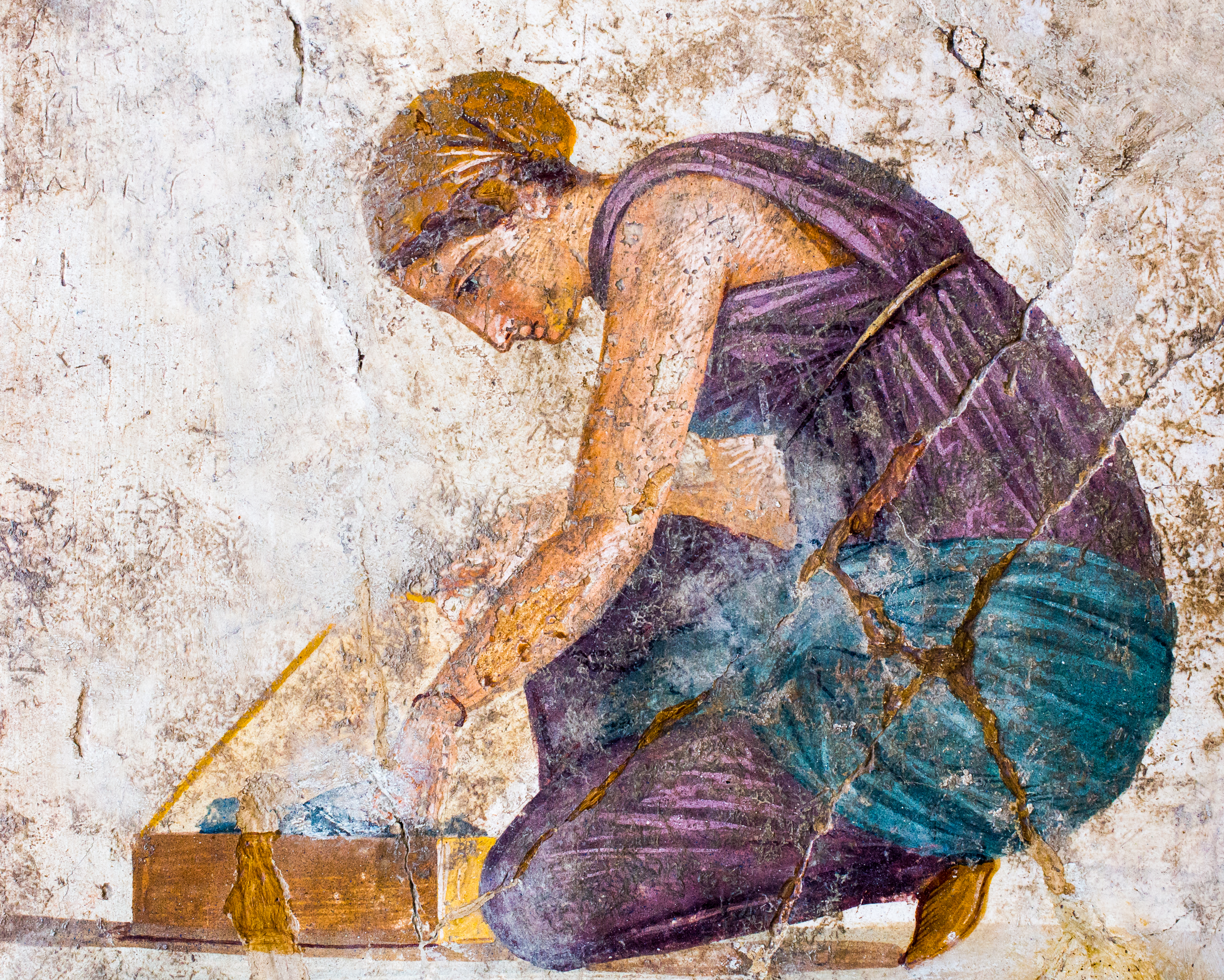
Handmaid looking through a storage box, detail of a wall painting from Pompeii

Poverty in ancient Rome is challenging to define as much of the Roman population lived in conditions that resemble modern poverty. Roman society was largely agrarian and afflictions such as low literacy rates, high infant mortality, and poor diets were widespread throughout the populace. Poverty can be defined through landlessness; the majority of land in ancient Rome was concentrated in the hands of a small class of wealthy people, leaving the rest of the population with little land. However, people in urban settings likely could have lived well without owning land. Ancient Roman poverty can also be viewed through the lens of political disenfranchisement; the poor were less able to access political offices, had increased difficulty casting ballots, had votes of lesser significance, and had higher tax rates. The Codex Theodosianus, a late Roman legal document, describes various laws in which the poor were to be punished differently from the rich. Estimates of the GDP per capita in ancient Rome suggest that the majority of the population was living at subsistence levels, with enough money to live securely but not comfortably.

Roman writers such as Seneca and Cicero describe the poorer parts of the population as unvirtuous and immoral masses who were threats to the nation and unconcerned with the values of the Roman world. Sallust, a 1st-century BCE Roman politician and historian, argued that the plebeians envied wealthier individuals and were motivated by jealousy to destabilize Roman society; he cites the Catilinarian conspiracy, an attempted coup which Sallust believed was promoted by the plebs. Other Roman writers like the 1st-century Roman philosopher Seneca condemned wealth, decrying it as corruptive and leading to discontentment in life. The Romans also valued simple agrarian lifestyles, honoring heroes such as Cincinnatus who—according to legend—lived on a farm prior to his military campaigns. Ancient Roman Christian depictions tend to depict the poor as more sympathetic and often call for the wealthy to help them. John Chrysostom, a 4th-century Christian theologian, argued that if the rich redistributed their wealth amongst the populace "you would have difficulty in finding one poor person for every fifty or even every hundred of the others." However, other Christian writers adopted less critical viewpoints on wealth; the 3rd-century theologian Clement of Alexandria portrayed wealth as morally neutral, arguing that the piety of the rich is not necessarily stifled by their wealth.

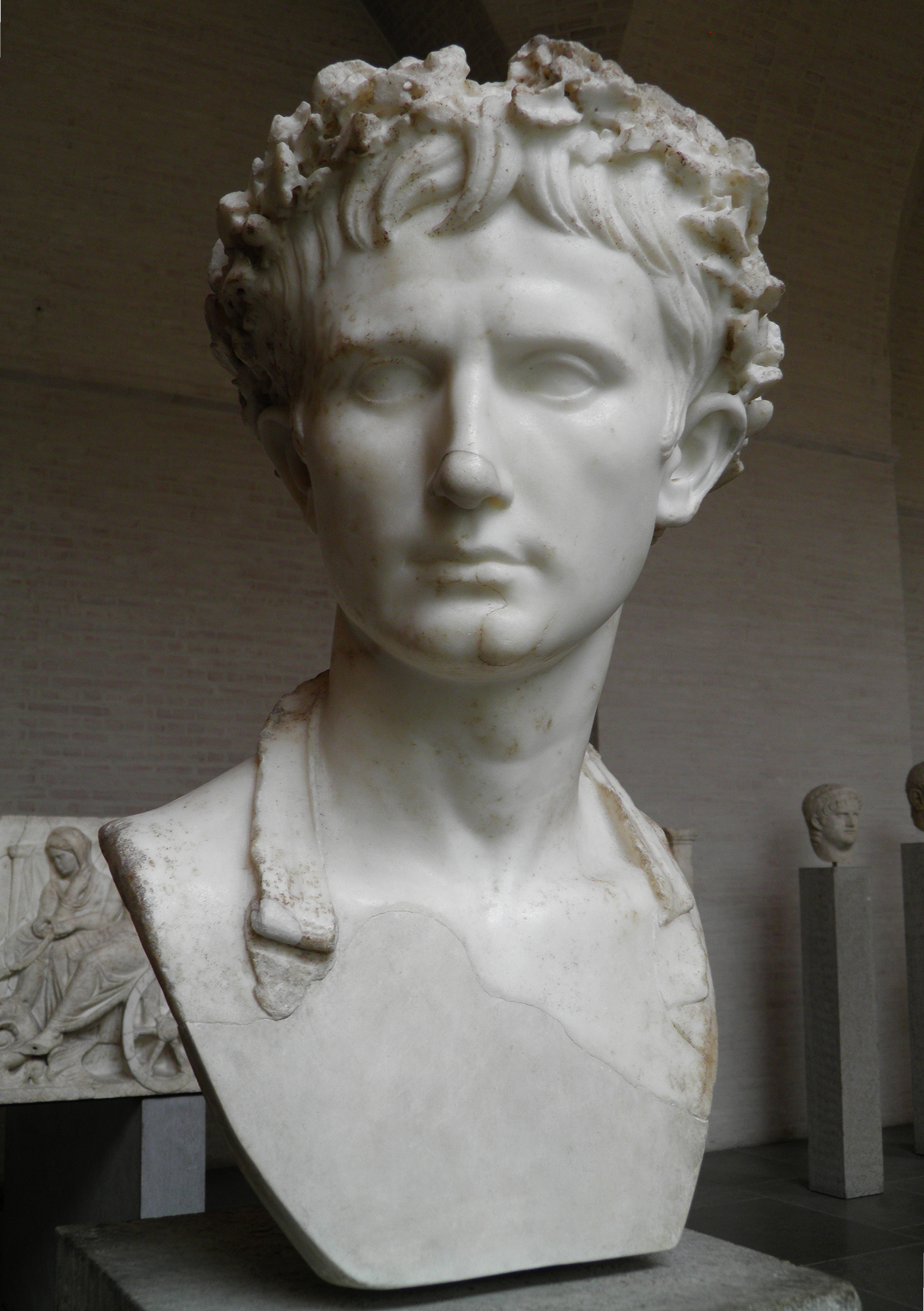
bust of Emperor Augustus, who reluctantly established the cura Annonae

The ancient Roman government implemented various policies designed to provide financial aid to the poor: the cura Annonae was a grain redistribution program and the alimenta was a welfare program for impoverished children. Wealthy Roman philanthropy, while it did occur, was often more motivated by the desire to appear benevolent and to build up one's social status than genuine altruism. Philanthropists in ancient Rome expected to have statues and plaques commemorating their generosity built in their honor. The selfish motivations often underpinning Roman gift-giving were noticed and mocked by contemporary writers: Cicero described this phenomenon, stating "We may also observe that a great many people do many things that seem to be inspired more by a spirit of ostentation than by heart-felt kindness; for such people are not really generous but are rather influenced by a sort of ambition to make a show of being open-handed." Seneca promoted genuine charity in his writings, declaring that the "wise man" will "stretch out his hand to the shipwrecked mariner, will offer hospitality to the exile, and alms to the needy." However, Seneca did not advocate for unrestricted generosity, arguing that charity should be limited to "good men or to those whom it [charity] may make into good men." Similar ideas were expressed by the 3rd-century BCE comic playwright Plautus: "A man who gives a beggar something to eat or drink does him bad service: what he gives him gets wasted and he prolongs his life in misery."

== Definition ==
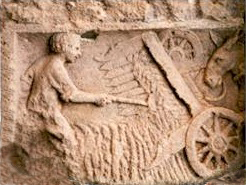
Ancient Roman farmer plowing their field

Defining poverty in ancient Rome can be difficult. The conditions of most people in the Roman world resembled modern ideas of poverty; ancient Rome was a largely agrarian, rural society afflicted with high rates of infant mortality, poor diets, and low literacy. Furthermore, true destitution in the ancient world was possibly a fatal, unsustainable condition. These factors may have prevented the development of a uniquely poor social class. Limited archaeological evidence for poorer classes creates additional challenges for modern scholars, inhibiting their ability to determine the social classes of the inhabitants. The Roman poor may be conceptualized as the class to which these unidentifiable sites belonged. Roman writers typically do not differentiate between different social strata amongst the poorer plebeian classes, instead dividing society into the wealthy upper-class patricians or equestrians and the lower-class masses.

In many cases, Roman social strata were organized according to political power more than economic standing. For example, the honestiores and humiliores were Roman social distinctions that classified army veterans, senators, equestrians, and municipal decurions as honestiores and the rest of the population as humiliores. The honestiores, being composed of individuals ranging from consuls to army veterans, almost certainly comprised a variety of distinct economic classes. Likewise, the humiliores must have consisted of individuals of a wide range of wealth as the Roman population almost entirely fell into this category. In the 2nd century CE, the Roman jurist Gaius argued that "The principal division of the law of persons is as follows, namely, that all men are either free or slaves." According to the classicist Dr. Peter Garnsey and the legal historian Dr. Caroline Humfress, the significance of the distinction between the free poor and slaves declined over the course of Roman history. Punishments traditionally reserved for slaves were becoming more common as punitive measures for other classes. Callistratus—a jurist who lived during the reign of Emperor Septimius Severus (r. 145–211)—claimed that the penalty of immolation, although once exclusive to slaves, became a punishment for plebeians and "men of low rank" (humilis personae). During the reign of Emperor Diocletian (r. 284–305), the system of tenant farmers—known as coloni—became more prominent; this system effectively reduced the Roman peasantry to serfdom.

Poverty itself may have been partially defined by the lack of political power; during the Roman Republic, only a small fraction of the massive population was truly capable of partaking in or influencing the political process. Upper-class individuals had easier access to political offices compared to lower-class people. The Centuriate Assembly, which elected higher magistrates, was divided into 193 centuriae organized according to property value. Senators, equestrians, and the first class held 88 centuriae; the 2 lowest classes held only 30 centuriae, and the lowest class—the proletarii—held only 1. Much of the Roman population was disenfranchised because they either lacked the legal ability to vote due to non-citizenship or because they lacked the practical capacity to deliver their ballot. The 1st-century BCE Greek historian Plutarch claims that during the tribunal election of the 2nd-century BCE populist reformer Gaius Gracchus, the Campus Martius could not accommodate all of the voters; instead, according to Plutarch, they shouted their chosen candidate from the rooftops nearby.

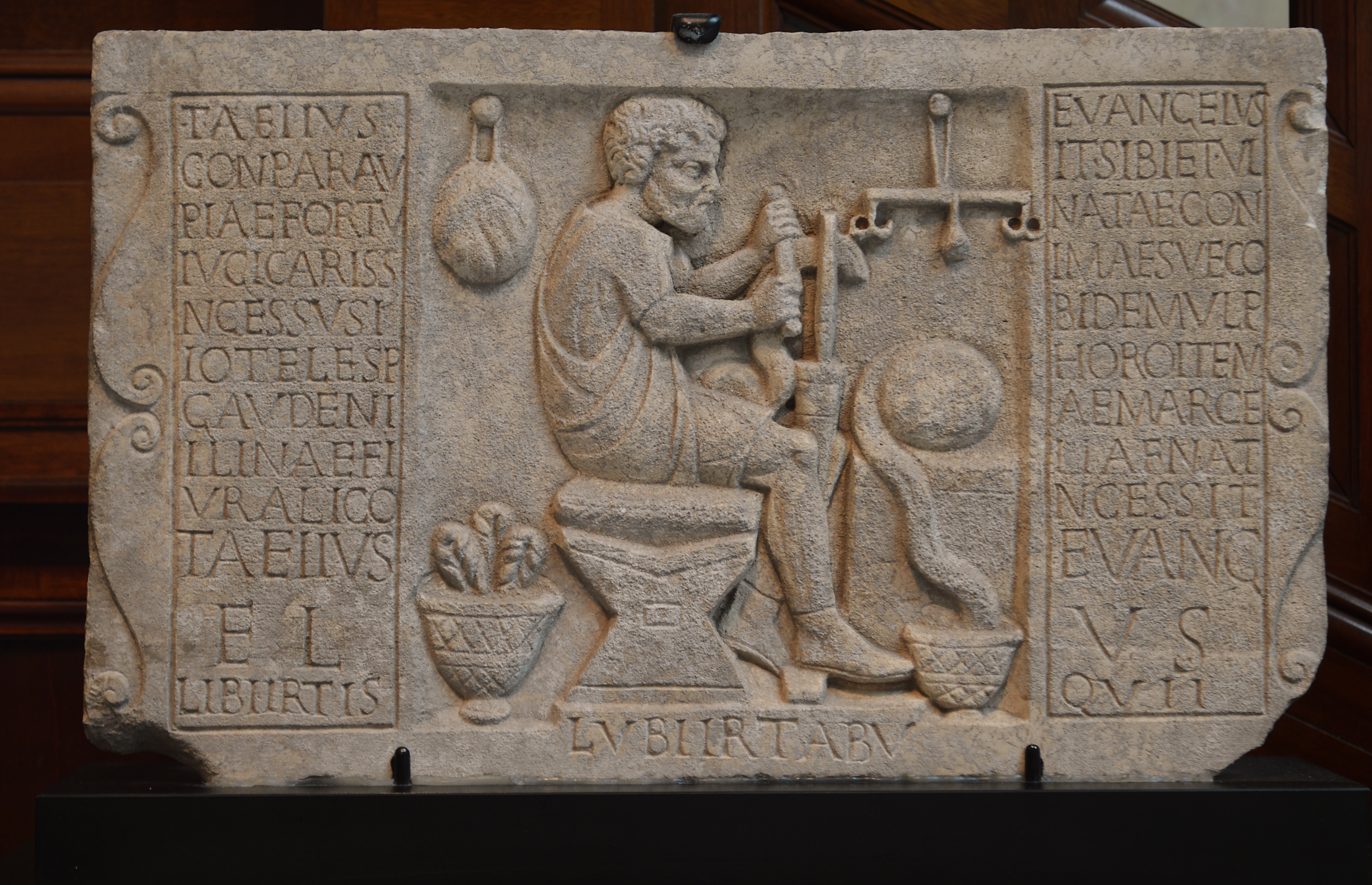
Gravesite marker (2nd century AD) for the wool merchant Titus Aelius Evangelus, likely a freedman of Antoninus Pius, along with his wife, Ulpia Fortunata; Ulpius Telesphorus, of likely Trajanic freedman lineage and a relative of the wife or a conlibertus; Gaudenia Marcellina, the natural daughter of Evangelus from a previous union; and their freedpersons and descendants

Another uncertainty is the presence of a Roman middle class. Their society may have consisted of a handful of wealthy individuals that made up 0.6% of the population, an army that made up 0.4% of the population, and the poor masses that made up 99% of the populace. However, the Roman census tracked numerous different social strata, implying that there were likely more middling classes consisting of people who maintained sizeable amounts of wealth without qualifying as rich. Other scholars, such as the classicist Dr. William Harris divided Roman society into three economic classes: those who relied on other's work, those who were well-off although they still worked, and the slaves and menial laborers. However, these distinctions do not identify the various unique subclasses within the broader classification of the Roman poor. Landownership may also have distinguished the poor from the wealthy in much of the Roman countryside. Those with significant amounts of quality land capable of yielding good crops were undoubtedly much wealthier than those without such luxuries. Such persons would have been freed from concerns affecting poorer civilians, such as food insecurity. Land was widely used as security for loans, making it harder for landless people to acquire wealth. Urbanized settings contained populations of landless, yet not necessarily impoverished, people; artisans and laborers in towns or cities could enrich themselves through their work, or at least benefit from food security. Cicero, a 1st-century BCE Roman statesman, claims that the Servian constitution, a legal text allegedly instituted by a legendary Roman king named Servius Tullius, classified the rich as the assidui and the poor as the proletarii. According to Cicero, the assidui were the wealthy while the proletarii were those who lacked more than 1,500 sesterces. Cicero believed that the proletarii were primarily expected to contribute children to the Roman population.

=== Wealth inequality ===
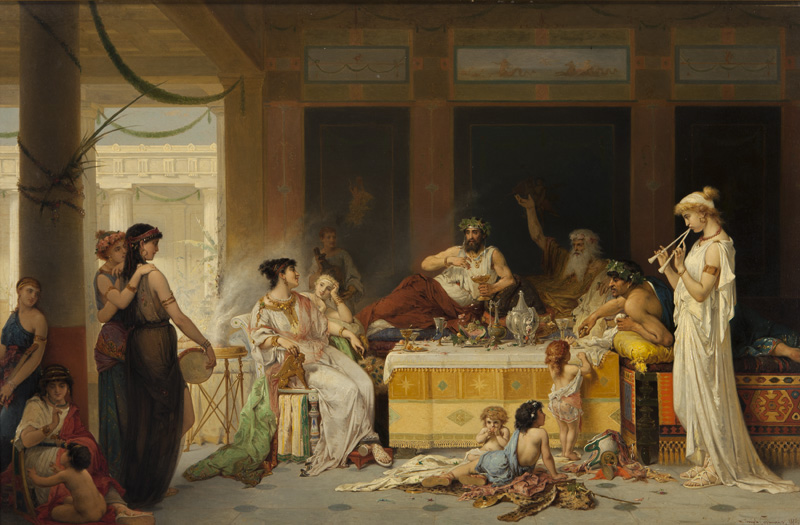
Roman banquet (1876) by Pierre Olivier Joseph Coomans

Estimates of the prices in ancient Rome suggest that even a small amount of money, amounting to 375 sesterces, could have equated to an annual income between 1,900 and 2,700 kilograms (4,200 and 6,000 lb) of grain. For a family of 4, this income likely could have provided between 475 and 675 kg (1,047 and 1,488 lb) of grain per person each year. This number is around the estimated GDP per capita of the Roman empire, which could have amounted to around 600 kg (1,300 lb) of grain. If these estimates are correct, which they may not be, then the poorer parts of the Roman population likely could reliably sustain themselves, although not necessarily live comfortably. The GDP per capita of Roman Italy was possibly similar to the economies of 18th-century Netherlands or Spain. Although incomes were certainly lower in the provinces, potentially around half the wages in Italy, archaeological evidence of urban development suggests that the population was growing during the early empire. Significant population growth further implies that the average provincial Roman had enough wealth to exist at subsistence living, facilitating population expansion. The historians Walter Scheidel and Steven Friesen estimated that, during the Roman Empire, around 6–12% of the Roman population had "middle-class" incomes, with the poor constituting around 80% of the population. They estimate that the Roman Empire had a Gini coefficient—a method for measuring wealth inequality—of 0.42 or 0.44.

British classicist Alan Bowman analyzed a register documenting Hermopolis in Roman Egypt; he found an extremely high Gini coefficient of 0.815. This suggests that most of the property was concentrated within a small segment of the population. Bowman found similar statistics, a Gini coefficient of 0.737, in a separate land register documenting the settlement of Philadelphia in Faiyum. The calculations of Bowman have been criticized by the classicist Roger Bagnall, who computed the Gini coefficient for the Philadelphia register and found a much lower number of 0.518. However, this data is not representative of the general Roman population as it concerns city-dwellers, who likely did not depend upon landownership as their source of income. If landless residents are included, the measurements of wealth inequality would increase substantially. Bagnall attempted to estimate landownership rates through tax collection records from Karanis. The taxes were collected in wheat and barley in proportion to the private or public land of the taxpayer. Although calculating landownership rates using this method is simplistic, its value is reduced by the lack of distinction between public and private land found in these records as well as the potential for the collected tax not equaling the assessed tax. When the non-villagers of Karanis who merely owned country estates were included, Bagnall identified a Gini coefficient of 0.638. For the villagers of the town, Bagnall computed a Gini coefficient of 0.431 using only the best-preserved data. When only private land is considered, the Gini coefficient for the non-residents lowers to 0.626 and rises to 0.478 for the villagers. At this time, Karanis was a declining settlement; contemporary documents contain complaints about the failing irrigation system and notes about the unproductivity of the land. These factors would impact the results, preventing Karanis from reflecting the Roman world at large. Collectively, the data suggests that Egyptian villagers likely had little inequality in the distribution of land; however, non-residents of these villages who nonetheless still owned land likely had a much more unequal distribution of landownership. Classicist Richard Duncan-Jones examined land registers from throughout the Roman Empire and similarly concluded that the majority of the land was owned by a small class of wealthy people. His research identified that around 4 CE, a single estate in Magnesia, owned 21% of the land.

== Social status and stigma ==
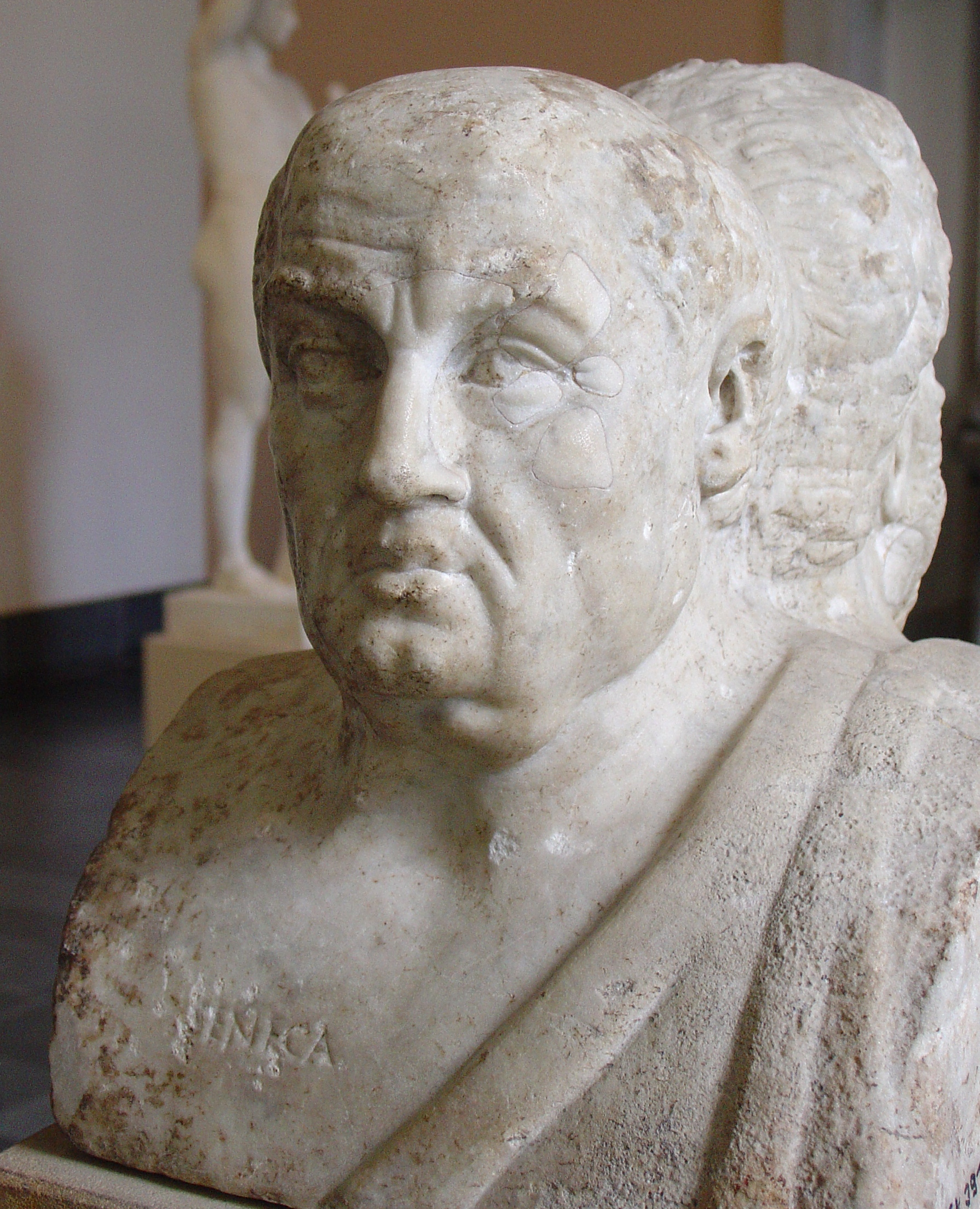
Bust of Seneca the Younger

Roman literature presents no unified perspective on poverty; it is subject to the rhetorical intentions of whomever is authoring the specific texts. Poverty frequently appears as a didactic tool in the Controversiae of Seneca the Elder. Although these descriptions may not reflect the personal beliefs of Seneca, they likely reflect the discourse on poverty found in Roman society. Seneca typically avoids exclusively focusing on poverty; poverty is usually cited to contrast with or criticize excessive materialism. Seneca the Younger argues that impoverished people can be free from greed and discontent, however he is not necessarily advising his readers to relinquish their wealth: he instead commands them to "either be a poor man, or resemble a poor man." The younger Seneca believed that wealth facilitated self-improvement, while poverty could prevent an individual from achieving any "virtue" other than not "being perverted nor crushed by his poverty."

The Romans idolized the ideal of a farmer and an agrarian life. In the story of the Roman hero Cincinnatus, he is said to have lived on a small farm before and after assuming dictatorial power to help fight opponents of the Republic. Cicero lauded the rural lifestyle for promoting virtue, stating "The city creates luxury, from which avarice inevitably springs, while from avarice audacity breaks forth, the source of all crimes and misdeeds. On the other hand, this country life, which you call boorish, teaches thrift, carefulness, and justice." However, urban poverty was viewed as much more contemptible by many ancient Romans; they associated urban poverty with crime and disease. Cicero called manual labor "unbecoming to a gentleman, too, and vulgar." He claimed that the wages paid to manual laborers served as a "pledge of their slavery."

During the late Republic, the poor were considered to be beneath others and to be lower in prestige and virtue than other social castes. The poor were viewed as treacherous dregs of society who were easily swayed and threats to political stability. Sallust, a 1st-century BCE Roman politician and historian, claimed that the plebs supported the Catilinarian conspiracy, which threatened to overthrow the Roman government. Sallust argues that they envied wealthy persons and were motivated by their discontent to upend the social order. Roman writers also considered the poor to only be concerned with "bread and circuses," rather than the intricacies and values of Roman society. The 1st-century Roman writer Tacitus complains about the "degraded populace" who were "frequenters of the arena and the theatre." Cynic philosophers, who upheld that humans should live simple lives in accordance with nature, were seen by some as a "crazy, wretched lot" unskilled "in practical affairs" according to the 1st-century Greek orator Dio Chrysostom. Martial, a 1st-century Roman poet, compares a poverty-stricken man named Cosmus to a dog, stating that whereas others mistake him for a Cynic philosopher, "He is no Cynic, Cosmus. What then? A dog." The man is described as elderly with white hair, an unkempt beard, and a cloak covering him. Martial describes an instance of the usage of litters and a servant to physically separate the rich from the poor; he claims the servant would clear crowds to prevent interaction between the masses and the wealthy client. Wealthy Romans were terrified of poverty, and the humiliations and social ostracization that came along with it. Role reversals between the rich and poor were a common theme in classical New Comedies.

=== Legal status ===
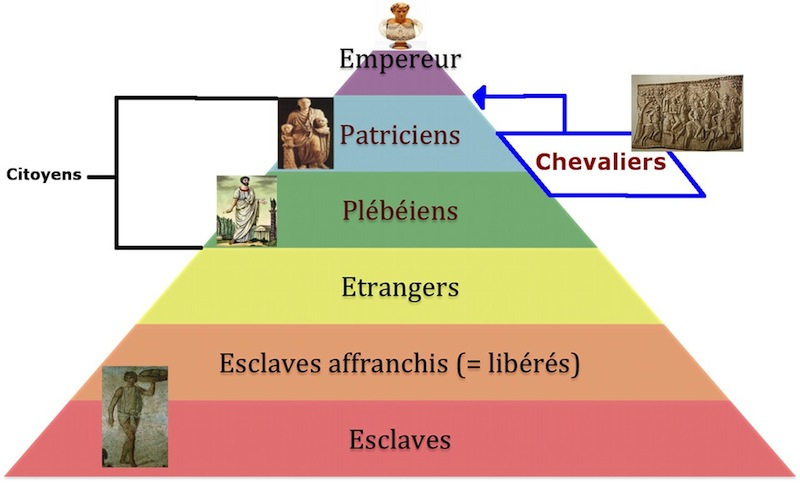
Pyramid of social classes in Ancient Rome (in French)

Julius Paulus, a Roman jurist of the 2nd and 3rd centuries, commented upon a legal prohibition on gifts between a husband and wife, arguing that the law exclusively applied to scenarios in which the partners were hostile towards each other; he claims that it does not concern instances where the gift-givers are "merely afraid of poverty." Ulpian, a 3rd-century Roman jurist, advised women to divorce their husbands and regain their dowry if their spouse faced bankruptcy. In 336, Emperor Constantine (r. 306–337) issued a law forbidding legal unions between high-status individuals and low-status individuals. The law lists slave women, freedwomen, common women, actresses, the daughters of actresses, and the daughters of gladiators or pimps as groups of women considered of too low social status for high-class men to marry. If senators or other magistrates attempted to provide inheritance or gifts to the children of a low-status marriage, then they would lose the protection of their citizenship status regarding their civil status and their property. Constantine also included "humilis vel abiecta," meaning "low and degraded" persons in his category of low-class people. Emperor Marcian (r. 450–457), in his legal novels, explains that some of his contemporaries considered poor people to constitute a "low and degraded" person. However, Marcian clarified that wealth had no bearing on whether an individual was deemed sufficient to marry a person of high status.

When determining the punishment for crimes such as theft, homicide, insults, betrayal, libel, or criminal conspiracy, the social status of the accused was taken into account. Ulpian, in the Digests, explains that the poor or slaves would be subject to corporal punishment if they maliciously destroy a legal notice either written in the register of an official or on a piece of papyrus, while others would be subject to a fine of 50 aurei. In another section of the Digests, Ulpian explains that monetary penalties could be substituted with physical punishment if the victim was too poor to afford the fine. By 392, a law decreed that poor individuals who housed Christian heretics would be beaten with clubs and deported. Another law of Constantine states that if an individual challenged the validity of a legal decision and if that decision was found to be correct, then they would be forced to work in mines for 2 years assuming they were too poor to accept the penalty of forfeiting half of the property and being exiled to an island for 2 years. The punishment of being condemned to work in the mines is replicated in another law where it is instead used as a punishment for people who entered a trial to determine the freedom of a slave and were defeated in court. If they were too poor to afford a fine, they would instead be sent to work in mines.

Despite these occasional references to poverty, Roman legal texts contain little mention of truly destitute people. The 1st-century jurist Publius Juventius Celsus describes a poor man who is forced to relinquish his ancestral tombs and household gods, indicating that this individual had some wealth as they could lose these luxuries. Tryphoninus, a jurist recorded in the Digests, imagines the scenario of a supposedly poor man who authored his will without the knowledge of wealth amassed through his slaves. This story similarly implies a level of wealth in the poor man, as he had owned slaves.

== Financial aid ==
=== Government programs ===
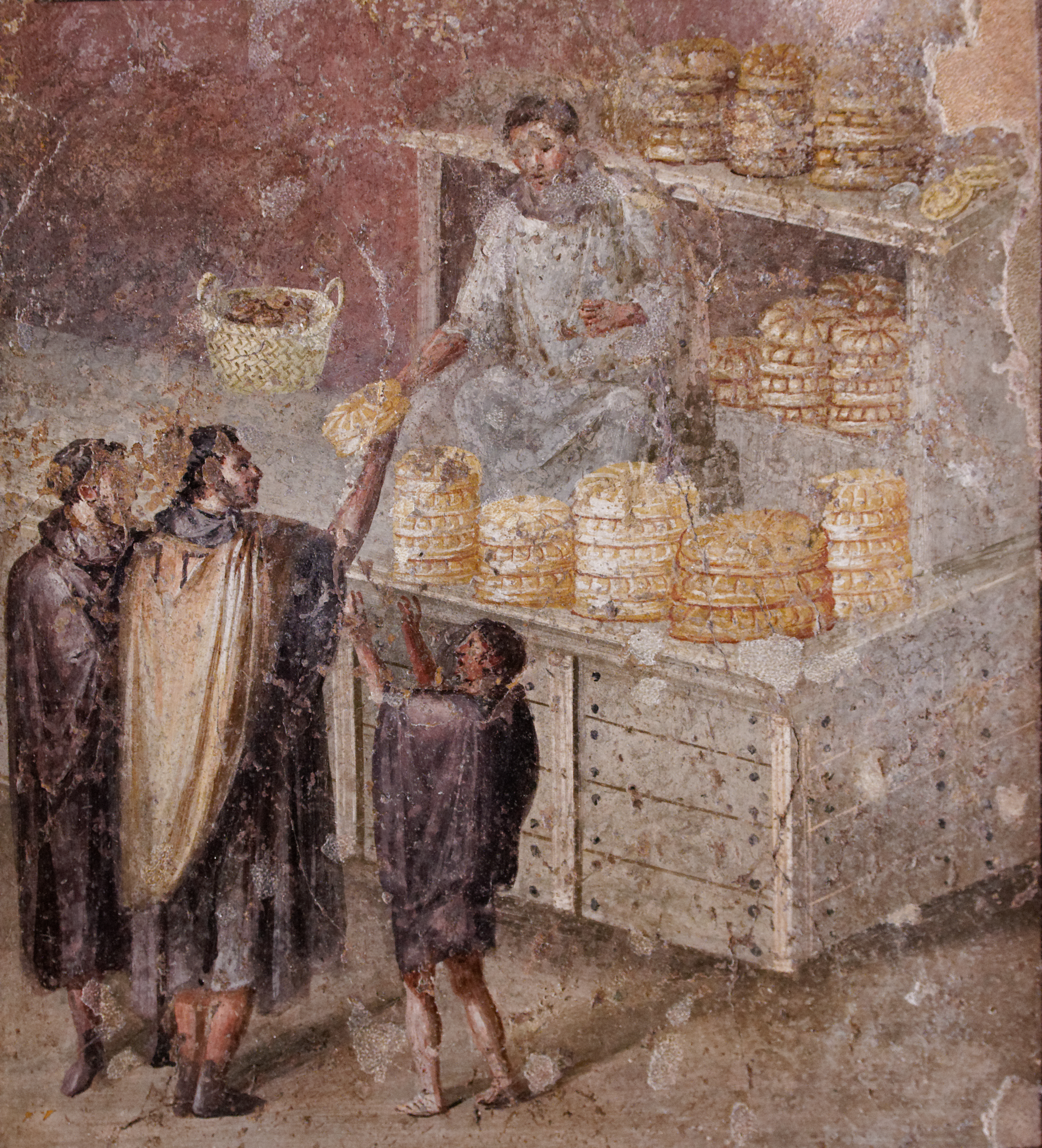
An ancient Roman politician redistributes bread

The cura Annonae was a program designed to aid Roman citizens residing in the city of Rome and, later, Constantinople. It was a grain redistribution program that gave free or subsidized grain. The formal grain supply was established in 123 BCE with the lex Sempronia frumentaria. By the middle of the 1st century BCE, the administration of the grain supply had been centered in the Porticus Minucia. Augustus allowed for the creation of the praefectus annonae, a government official responsible for managing the cura Annonae. Those eligible for the cura Annonae were likely also eligible for the congiarium, a gift of money delivered by the emperor to the populace. Philanthropic acts could also be performed through the alimenta, a welfare program designed to aid poor children in Roman Italy. The program was possibly started by Emperor Nerva (r. 96–98)—although expanded by Emperor Trajan (r. 98–117)—and funded by wealth gained through the Dacian wars, philanthropy, and taxation. It was last recorded during the reign of Emperor Aurelian (r. 98–117).

In 315, Constantine issued a decree mandating the provision of food and clothing supplies to parents incapable of raising their children due to poverty: "It shall be incumbent on your office consul to ensure that if any parent shall produce a child whom on account of poverty he cannot raise, then food and clothing shall be furnished forthwith; for no delay can be tolerated in the matter of the rearing of a child." Another law instituted by Constantine noted that individuals were driven by poverty to sell their children into slavery; the law declares that financial aid should be provided to people facing this situation to prevent them from selling their children. Emperor Valentinian I (r. 364–375) passed a law declaring that any clergyman who attempted to delay legal proceedings by issuing an appeal before the final ruling would be required to pay 50 pounds of silver in fine, money that would then, according to the legal text, be spent upon the poor.

=== Private philanthropy ===
Although in ancient Rome the concept of a legal person existed in the form of collegia, this principle did not extend to charitable organizations. For wealthy Romans to engage in philanthropy, donations had to be offered in the form of a gift or through a will. In some circumstances, wealthy Romans aimed to establish funds in the form of legislation proposed to local government. An ancient inscription from Acmonia recounts a legislative proposal by an individual named Titus Flavius Praxias to, in 85 CE, to allocate the funds earned from select pieces of property for an annual banquet. Nerva permitted all local governments to receive gifts; by the reign of Emperor Hadrian (r. 117–138) all stipulations associated with donations were enforceable. However, the local government retained the right to reallocate the provided funds for other purposes. According to ancient records, an individual Gaius Vibius Salutaris attempted to create a fund for the six tribes of Ephesus. Although at least half the funds were used for other purposes. In 321, Constantine affirmed the legality of leaving testamentary gifts of money to the church with the intention of the funds eventually being redirected to the poor. Marcian, on 455, issued a law addressing the same practice; declaring that the uncertainty of the recipients—the "poor" are not necessarily a specific group—did not render the testament void.

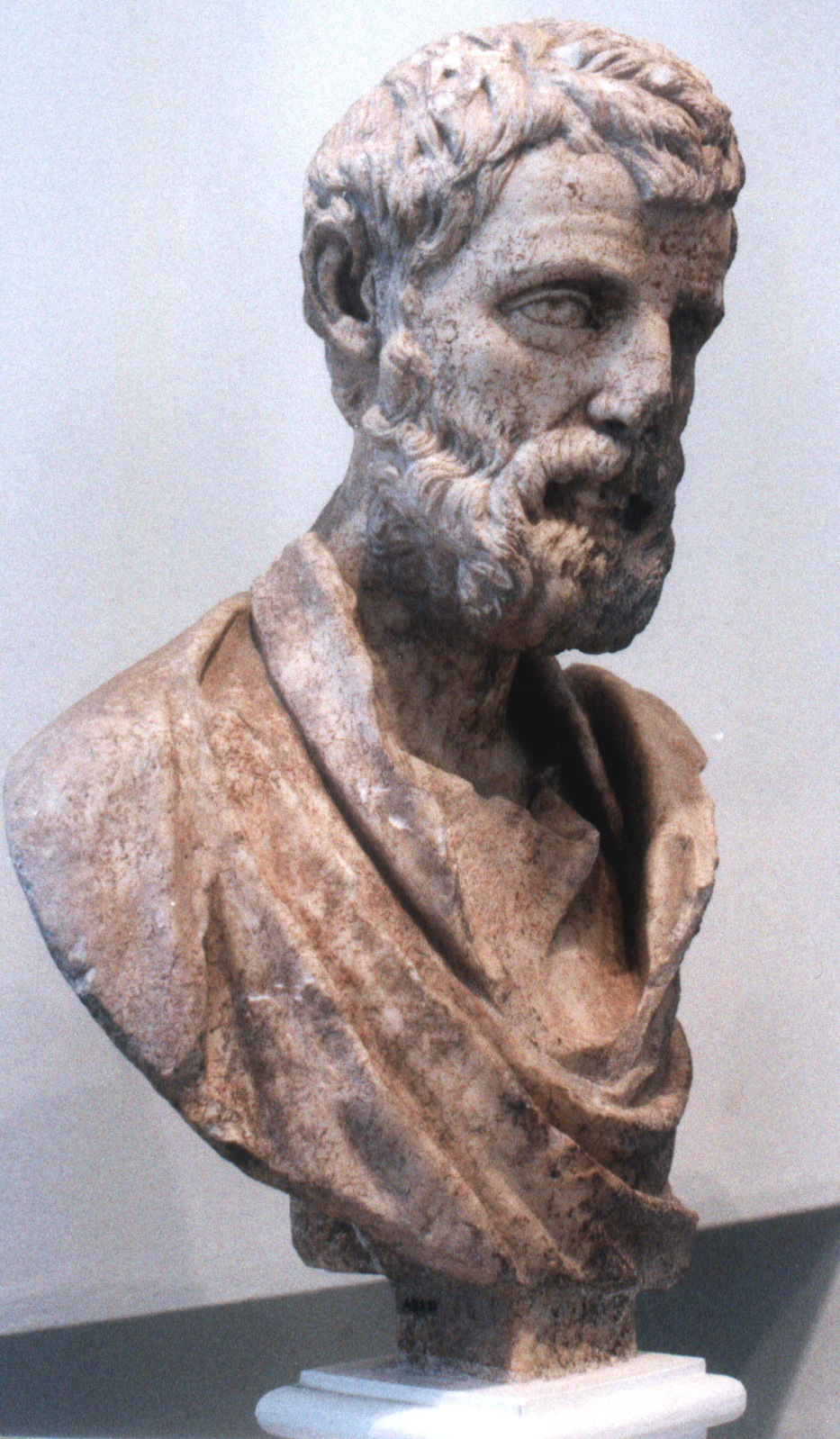
Herodes Atticus, a Greek philanthropist of Ancient Rome active during the 2nd century CE

Usually, ancient Roman philanthropy was motivated by a desire to receive something in return. Latin terms such as obligatus, nexus, and damnatus all were used in the context of punishment for debts, although they initially referred to the recipients of a gift who therefore owed a return on the favor. The 2nd-century BCE Roman comic playwright Terence mocked the reciprocal nature of Roman gift-giving: "this reminder to the forgetful of a service rendered is almost a reproach." John Chrysostom, a 4th-century CE Christian apologist, rejected the idea that gifts should only be offered with the expectation of a reward: "Do not give to the rich who can give back."

Philanthropic acts were important for presenting oneself as a generous and virtuous member of society; if a wealthy Roman did not partake in philanthropy, they would bring infamia—a loss of social standing—onto themselves. According to Plutarch, the masses "are more hostile to a rich man who does not give them a share of his private possessions than to a poor man who steals from the public funds" as they believe that the former’s conduct is due to arrogance and contempt of them, but the latter’s to necessity." Cicero, claimed that the improvement of social status motivated most altruistic acts: "We may also observe that a great many people do many things that seem to be inspired more by a spirit of ostentation than by heart-felt kindness; for such people are not really generous but are rather influenced by a sort of ambition to make a show of being open-handed." It was common practice for people who had funded the construction of buildings to leave a marker announcing their role in the construction process. This practice was designed to boost the popularity and reputation of the benefactor, who, due to their philanthropy, could have a statue depicting them built in their honor. One inscription from Gytheum dated to 161–169 CE describes the conditions attached to a philanthropic donation; the donor recorded the gift upon three marble stones, which they asked to be publicly displayed in the local market, the Temple of Caesar, and the gymnasium. In some circumstances, older statues were reused; their inscriptions were replaced to honor new benefactors. Cicero commented upon this whilst serving as governor of Cilicia, declaring that the "false inscriptions" of statues were truly dedicated to others. Tacitus, a 1st-century CE Roman historian, describes an accusation against the proconsul of Bithynia, Granius Marcellus, which claimed that he substituted the head of a statue of Emperor Augustus (r. 27 BCE – 14 CE) with a bust of Emperor Tiberius (r. 14–37). The good reputation the wealthy would gather through these efforts allowed for them to gain favors from other wealthy Romans. In Pro Plancio, a legal defense of Gnaeus Placius in 54 BCE, Cicero asks "Who ever can have, or who ever had such resources in himself as to be able to stand without many acts of kindness on the part of many friends?" This statement implies that the gift-giving and the repayment of gifts were of significant economic benefit to the wealthy. Political ambitions also motivated philanthropy: patricians offered plebeians services such as legal defenses, invitations to feasts; or offerings of food, clothing, and money in exchange for support during elections.

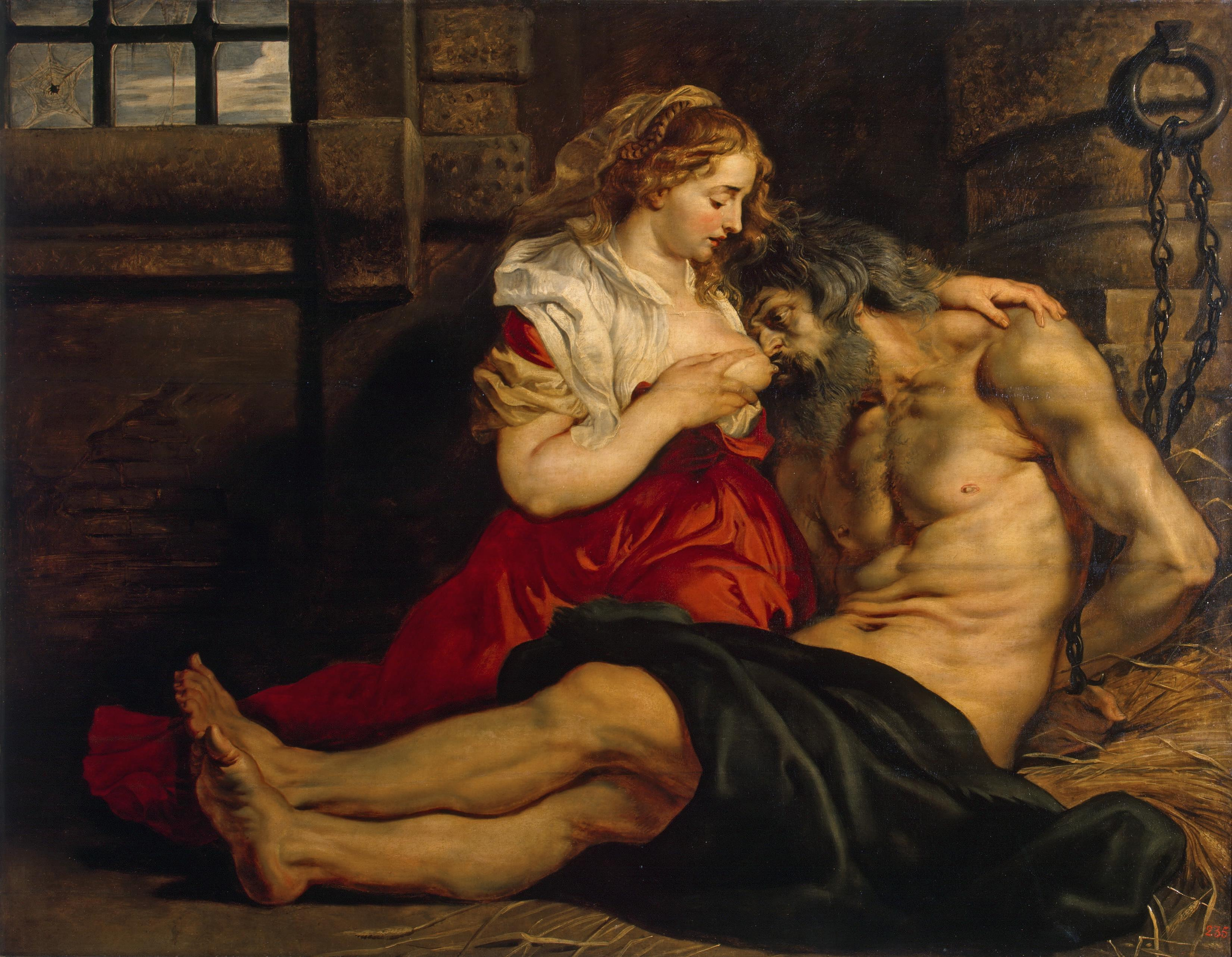
Roman Charity (c. 1612) by Peter Paul Rubens. Painting based on the story of Cimon and Pero

Cicero critiqued the selfish motivations behind many charitable acts in ancient Rome; he instead promoted acts of genuine generosity: "There is nothing so characteristic of narrowness and littleness of soul as the love of riches; and there is nothing more honorable and noble than to be indifferent to money, if one does not possess it, and to devote it to beneficence and liberality, if one does possess it." Cicero utilized the Roman concept of humanitas in his writings, which had, by the 1st century CE, acquired a new meaning referring to a level of concern for the welfare of others. Ideas of the sacredness of humanity found their way into stoic schools of thought; the 1st-century CE Stoic philosopher Seneca exclaimed that "man is a sacred thing to man," Seneca believed that the "wise man" will "stretch out his hand to the shipwrecked mariner, will offer hospitality to the exile, and alms to the needy—not in the offensive way in which most of those who wish to be thought tender-hearted fling their bounty to those whom they assist and shrink from their touch, but as one man would give another something out of the common stock." Seneca condemned unrestricted generosity stemming from pity, calling pity "a disease of the mind" although "many praise it as a virtue, and say that a good man is full of pity." These views of Seneca likely reflect the ideas of Graeco-Roman philosophy; Aristotle believed that pity partially stemmed from fear that similar misfortunes might befall oneself. Seneca may have felt that pity, since it stemmed from fear, upstaged the Stoic ideal autarcheia, or being untroubled by emotion. His condemnation of the emotion of pity does not necessarily indicate he rejected all charitable acts. Seneca described instances of individuals feeling obligated to aid a poor person due to pity. He describes an instance of a mother being compelled to aid a beggar due to the presence of an exposed child. According to Seneca, the woman imagined her own son in the position of the child. Similarly, John Chrysostom alleged some to have blinded their own children, chewed old shoes, attached sharp nails to their heads, dwelled in frozen pools with bare stomachs, and "different things yet more horrid than these" to make them more sympathetic. The 1st-century BCE Roman poet Horace describes a beggar who attempts to attract attention by pretending to have a broken leg.

However, the kindness of these philosophers did not necessarily extend to all the impoverished of ancient Rome; instead, they believed that all of the beneficiaries of this aid should be respectable members of the population with good moral character. Seneca advises wealthy persons to limit their charity to "good men or to those whom it may make into good men." Plautus expressed the same point more succinctly: "A man who gives a beggar something to eat or drink does him bad service: what he gives him gets wasted and he prolongs his life in misery." Legislation from the Codex Theodosianus dated to June 20, 382, ordered an examination of the beggars throughout Rome. They decreed that enslaved beggars of no disability were to be granted to those who informed upon them; freeborn beggars of no disability were made permanent coloni of those who informed upon them. Upper-class Romans were far more likely to help other members of the upper-class than they were to help poorer civilians. Juvenal, a 2nd-century CE Roman poet, describes how mobs of poor individuals harassed the carriages of the rich if they slowed down on the Via Appia in Ariccia. Wealthier citizens may have been motivated to aid these people due to the fear of being physically assaulted or publicly shamed.

== Living conditions ==
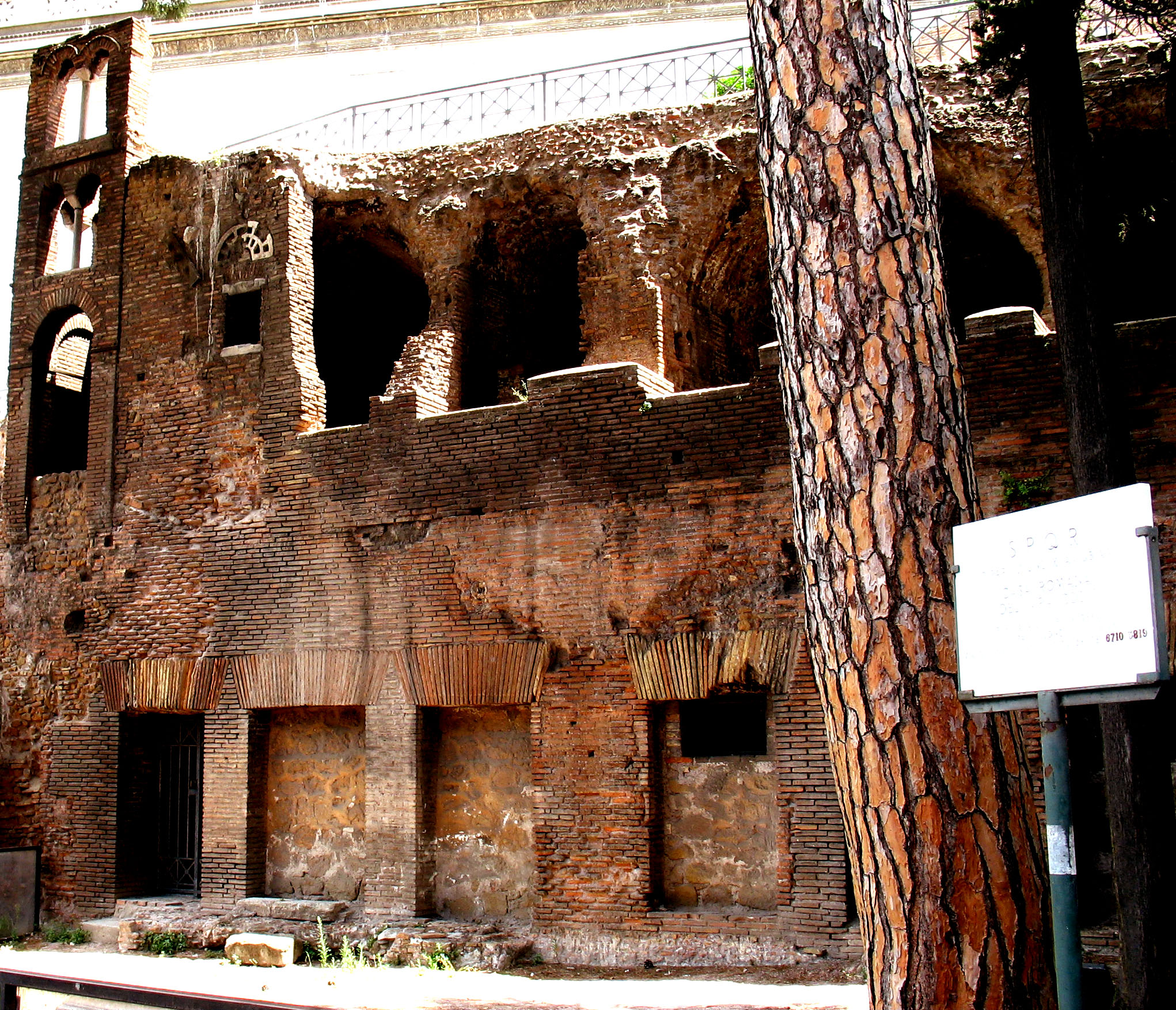
Ancient Roman insula from Ara Coeli

Poor Romans often sold themselves or their child into slavery. According to Ammianus Marcellinus, a Roman historian, the Roman poor lived in tabernae, or the vaults beneath the seating of theaters, amphitheaters, and circus. Although, in another translation of the text by Dr. John Rolfe the "vaults" are the awnings of the theaters. They also lived in low-quality apartment buildings called insulae. Insulae were often constructed using low-quality materials, creating structurally unstable buildings vulnerable to fire or collapse; they were plagued with thin walls unable to support their height. Poor sanitation was commonplace throughout Roman insulae; they were poorly ventilated, contained cesspits of human waste, and had cramped, dark, and damp rooms. These factors all made insulae hotbeds for disease, cross-species transmission, and the growth of parasitic microorganisms. The poorest parts of the Roman population were unable to afford most forms of social interaction and demonstrations of status, such as thermae, dinners, or collegia. They were further excluded from lavish burial and cremation rites as they were unable to afford the expenses. The poorest people were inhumed in mass graves called puticuli. The rest of the poor were buried in modest, small graves or were cremated with their remains stored in amphorae.

Archaeological evidence suggests that the ancient Roman poor primarily consumed cereals such as millet, wheat, barley, rye, and emmer. Their diets were likely supplemented by onions, garlic, dry legumes, olive oil, wine, pork, and fish. Galen claimed that people who lived in rural areas and impoverished townsfolk consumed flat-cakes as part of their diets; he further states that, during times of extreme hunger, famished people make bread of oats. Products of horticulture, such as eggs or cheese, were likely unavailable to the Roman poor. It is likely that meat was largely absent from the diet of the Roman poor, although this likely changed following the introduction of free pork by Aurelian. The limited diets of the poor may have led them to develop nutritional deficiencies, such as inadequate levels of Vitamin C in the body. However, Dr. Peter Garnsey concluded that the amount of wheat necessary to fulfill the energy requirements for survival would also provide sufficient protein to avoid protein-energy malnutrition. Although, this calculation does not include energy requirements for children, pregnant women, or lactating people.

Geography influenced the availability of certain types of food to different parts of the Roman population, thus affecting their diets and overall health. Skeletons in Herculaneum were found to be unusually tall for ancient Romans, possibly due to easier access to protein through fish because of the coastal location of the city. Although it has been generally assumed that meat was largely unavailable to the Roman poor, archaeological evidence compiled by Dr. Kim Bowes suggests that Roman peasants had meat-intensive diets and a close relationship with working animals.

The majority of Romans likely owned few pieces of clothing, especially those too poor to afford a loom and thus incapable of creating their own clothing. Poorer Romans would likely have made extensive use of secondhand clothing and recycling pieces of preexisting clothes. Cato, a 3rd-century BCE Roman politician, advises readers to reuse old tunics and make a "patchwork of it" when new clothes are needed. They may also have turned to thievery for clothing supplies; ancient sources described pawnshops trading stolen clothes and legal documents as well as curse tablets mentioning examples of clothing theft.

Poor Romans were especially vulnerable during crises, being susceptible to food shortages or being the victims of crime. Wealthier Romans were more capable of escaping dangerous conditions. They could afford higher quality housing free of the unsanitary conditions plaguing low-income households. According to the 2nd-3rd century Roman historian Herodian, during a time of plague in the city of Rome in which many common people suffered greatly, the Emperor Commodus (r. 177–192) left Rome for Laurentum. Bioarcheologists Dr. Rebecca Gowland and Dr. Rebecca Redfern found that poorer children in ancient Rome grew shorter than the children of wealthier families. Furthermore, the skeletal remains of likely poorer people display evidence of prolonged stress from physical labor. During difficult times, the Roman poor may have been compelled to offer themselves into contracts as tenant farmers called coloni.

== Christianity ==
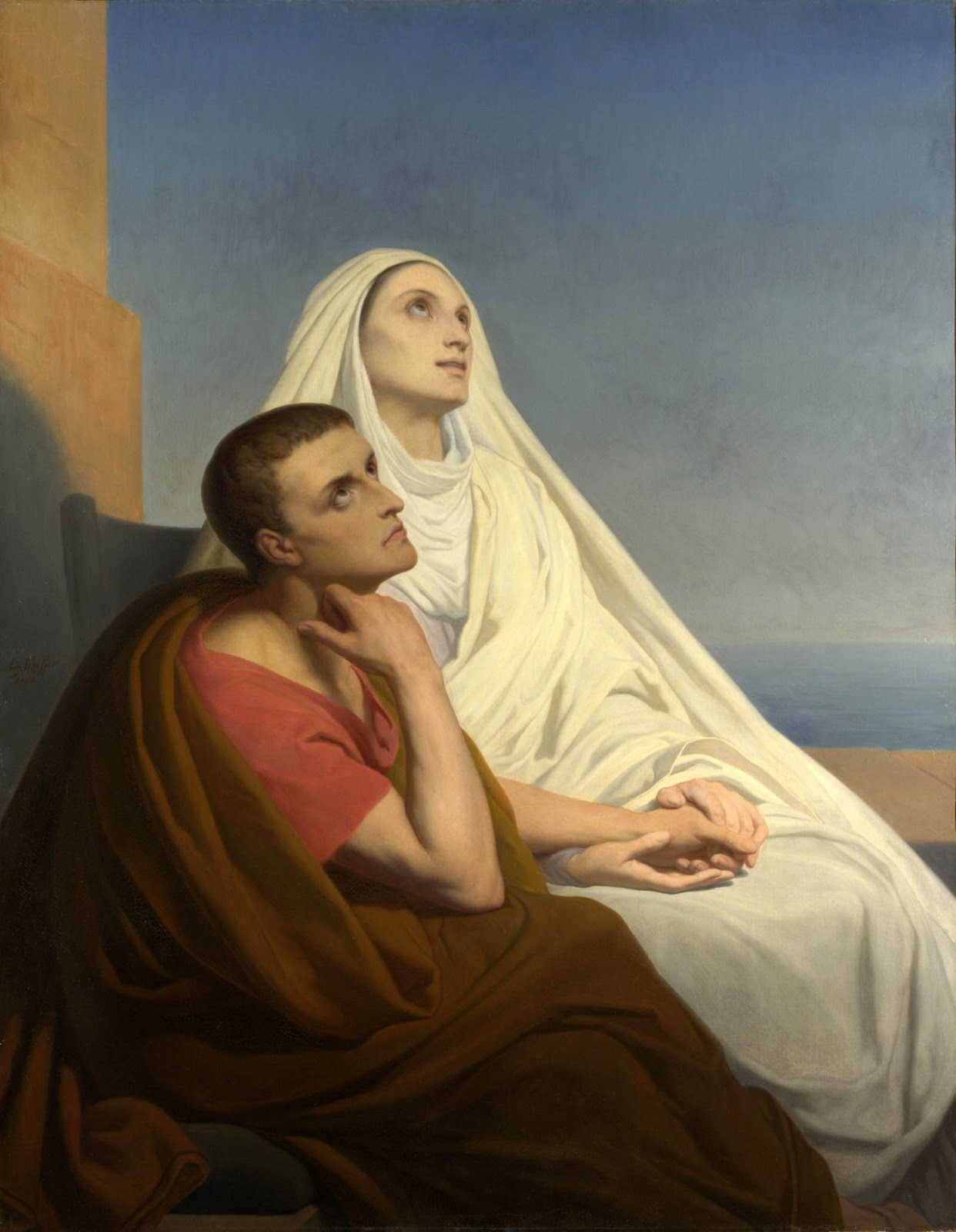
Saint Augustine and his mother, Saint Monica (1846) by Ary Scheffer

Christians in ancient Rome sought to highlight the poorer members of Roman society and to bring attention to their struggles. Augustine of Hippo, a 4th-century Christian theologian, highlights the neediness of the poor when describing them, referring to the poor as "egentes" or "indigentes", both of which mean "needy." Augustine promotes the provision of alms to the downtrodden; he emphasizes the want and desire of the impoverished, advising his followers to "let the needy person rejoice in your gift, so that you may rejoice in God’s gift." Augustine portrays his own followers as needy of God, stating "Supply, then, what the needy person lacks, so that God may fill your inner being."

Throughout Christian literature from antiquity, it was considered pious to adopt voluntary poverty to alleviate the burden of the involuntarily poor. Catholic pope Clement I (r. 88–99) states that "Many have delivered themselves to slavery, and provided food for others with the price they received for themselves." St Jerome, a 4th and 5th century theologian, advised the wealthy Roman woman Eustochium to relinquish their property and wealth: "You must also avoid the sin of covetousness, and this not merely by refusing to seize upon what belongs to others, for that is punished by the laws of the state, but also by not keeping your own property, which has now become no longer yours." The 2nd-century Christian writer Tertullian describes a Christian community utilizing a collective treasure-chest, donations to which were used for providing financial aid to the poor. Paulinus, a 4th-century Christian Bishop, describes the Christian senator Pammachius hosting a banquet for the poor in St Peter's Basilica in his epistulae. The intended audience of this letter is unclear; it is directed towards Pammachius, but it relitigates his own party to him. It is possible that this description was targeted towards a more general audience, possibly as part of an attempt to publicize the generosity of the church. Peter Brown, an Irish historian, theorized that Christian descriptions of the poor were often exaggerated to justify their leadership.

The Canons of church councils throughout 5th and 6th-century Gaul often discuss the issue of church expenditure, they aim to avoid the misallocation of funds intended to be directed towards the poor. Embezzlement is mentioned in a letter of Pope Simplicius (r. 468–483) dated to 475; Simplicius describes the scheme of Bishop Gaudentius to siphon church funds for himself. St Jerome mentions church corruption in a letter to Nepotianus: "To rob a friend is theft, but to defraud the church is sacrilege." He calls such acts the "most manifest villainy." St Ambrose, a 4th-century Christian theologian complains that church funds intended for the poor and vulnerable were instead given to "people who are in perfectly good health." St. Ambrose argues that these individuals "come along with no good reason other than the fact that they spend their lives wandering from place to place, and their intention is to use up the supplies intended for the poor."

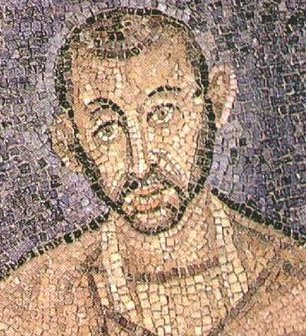
Detail from possibly contemporary mosaic (c. 380–500) of Ambrose in the Basilica of Sant'Ambrogio

Pelagius, a 4th-century theologian, argues that the poor can resist the temptation to sin easier than the rich can: "it is easier for the poor man to divest himself of such feelings than it is for the rich man, since poverty not only does not provide the raw materials for sin but in most cases renders it impossible." However, the 2nd-century theologian Origen warns that the impious poor may still face divine punishment, asking "how many, because they bore poverty ignobly, with behavior more servile and base than was seemly in Saints, have fallen away from their heavenly hope?"

Not all Christians unanimously agreed that wealth was to be entirely avoided. Clement of Alexandria, a 3rd-century Christian theologian, argued that wealth was morally neutral; instead, he proposed that virtue was determined by how an individual utilized their riches. He argues that rich men are equally capable of salvation as poor men as their salvation is determined by their piety and virtue, characteristics which Clement believed exist independently of wealth. Clement opted for a nonliteral interpretation of a scene from the Gospel of Mark in which Jesus advises a rich man to sell his possessions and provide for the poor, proposing that men need not surrender their wealth entirely but must instead act philanthropically. Ambrosiaster, an unidentified author of a 4th-century commentary on the epistles of St Paul, weighed the virtues and vices of the rich and poor alike; he analyzed the respective spiritual merit of each social strata. Ambrosiaster argued that nobility in poverty was more admirable than nobility in wealth, stating "There is much more merit in practicing justice in poverty." He argued that lust is more loathsome in the wealthy than in the poor, as the rich can act with less fear of punishment. However, Ambrosiaster claimed that the limited resources of poor people may hinder their ability to satisfy their desires, possibly motivating them to commit crimes to satiate their lust. However, he also argued that in some circumstances, wealth was preferable to poverty for leading a pious lifestyle: "Pride is always a vice, but it is much more reprehensible in the poor than in the rich, because abundance enfolds the heart of the rich, while the poor is superb even in poverty, which is almost an act of madness; so the poor man is more guilty." Ambrosiaster further believed that poverty was not mandatory for a pious Christian lifestyle, claiming that both lifestyles "are therefore just." Proba, a 4th-century Christian poet and Roman aristocrat, argued for acts of charity amongst close family members and made little mention of the poor. Whilst describing a story of Jesus counseling a rich young man, she neglects to mention his command to the rich man to sell his possessions and provide for the impoverished.
