= Atarneus sub Pitanem =

Ancient town in Aeolis

Coordinates: 38°55′42″N 26°51′35″E

Atarneus (Ancient Greek: Ἀταρνεύς), called Atarneus sub Pitanem to distinguish it from the other city of the name, was a town of ancient Aeolis near Pitane.

Its site is located near Gavurgör, Asiatic Turkey.
