= Eubulus (banker) =

4th-century BC Bithynian banker

Eubulus (Greek: Εὔβουλος Euboulos; fl. 4th-century BCE) was a banker from Bithynia, a region on the south shore of the Black Sea. He once lent money to a Persian official, taking the lands of Assos and Atarneus in Aiolis (Aeolis) in Asia Minor as security, and thus became ruler of the two realms. He is most famous for his connection to his slave Hermias, who inherited the position of ruler of the city. It was Hermias who invited Xenocrates and Aristotle to his court, and later became Aristotle's father-in-law.
