= Malene =

Town of ancient Aeolis

Coordinates: 39°12′01″N 26°48′15″E

Malene (Ancient Greek: Μαλήνη or Μαληνή) was a town of ancient Aeolis in the Atarneitis. At Malene, Histiaeus was defeated by the Persians.

Its site is located near Bahçeli, Asiatic Turkey.
