= Nicomachus (father of Aristotle) =

Father of the Ancient Greek philosopher Aristotle

Nicomachus (Ancient Greek: Νικόμαχος; fl. c. 375 BC) was the father of Aristotle. The Suda states that he was a doctor descended from Nicomachus, son of Machaon, son of Asclepius, the god of Medicine. He likely trained Aristotle in dissection and empirical observation, which was traditional for members of Asclepidae. Greenhill notes he had another son named Arimnestus and a daughter named Arimneste by his wife Phaestis (sometimes spelled Phaestias), who was also a member of Asclepidae.

Nicomachus was a native of Stagira and the friend and physician of Amyntas III, king of Macedonia, (393–369/370 BC). Nicomachus, then Phaestis, died in the following years after Amyntas' death, so Aristotle came under the care of Proxenus of Atarneus, Arimneste's husband, between the ages of 10 and 13. Nicomachean Ethics, Aristotle's work on ethics, may have been named after Aristotle's father or after his son, also named Nicomachus, who edited it. Aristotle's son was likely named after his grandfather.
