= Tarne (city) =

Tarne (Ancient Greek: Τάρνη) was a town of ancient Asia Minor, mentioned by Homer in the Iliad, and after him by Strabo; but Pliny the Elder knows Tarne only as a fountain of Mount Tmolus in ancient Lydia. Several ancient writers, such as Stephanus of Byzantium identified Atarneus with the Homeric place.
