= Stagira (ancient city) =

Ancient Greek city in Central Macedonia

- Stageira
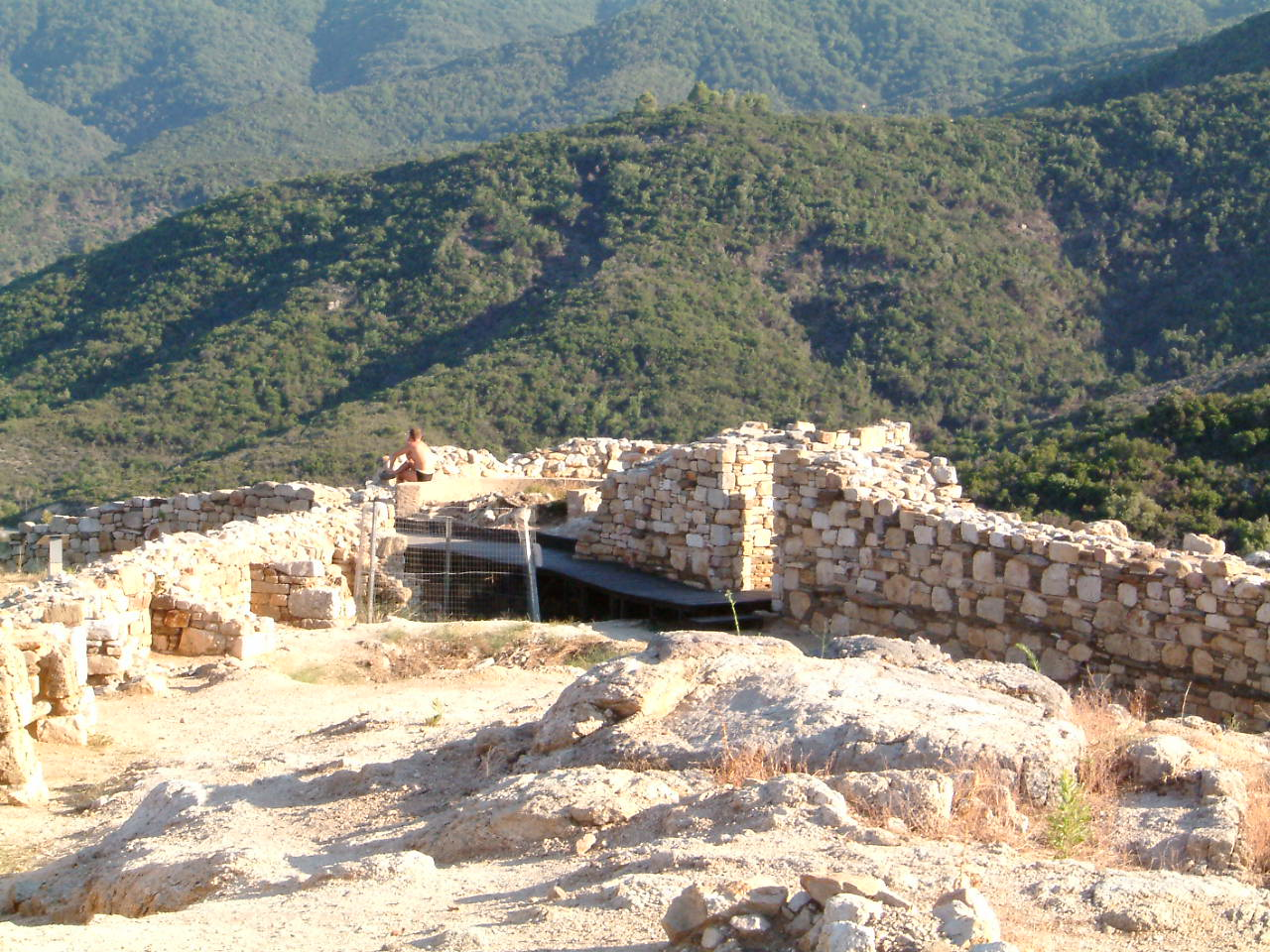
- Remains of the town wall of Stagira

- Location within Greece
- 40°35′30″N 23°47′41″E
- Type: Settlement
- Associated with: Aristotle
- Location: Olimpiada, Central Macedonia, Greece

History
- Built: 655 BC
- Built by: Ionian settlers from Andros

Site notes
- Condition: Ruined
- Owner: Public
- Management: 16th Ephorate of Prehistoric and Classical Antiquities
- Public access: Yes
- Website: Hellenic Ministry of Culture and Tourism

Stagira (/stəˈdʒaɪrə/), Stagirus (/-rəs/), or Stageira (Greek: Στάγειρα or Στάγειρος) was an ancient Greek city located near the eastern coast of the peninsula of Chalkidice, which is now part of the Greek province of Central Macedonia. It is chiefly known for being the birthplace of Aristotle, the Greek philosopher and polymath, student of Plato, and teacher of Alexander the Great. The ruins of the city lie approximately 18 kilometres (11 mi) northeast of the present-day village of Stagira, and adjacent to the town of Olympiada. Remains of the ancient city walls, residential buildings, and public structures are visible.

== History ==
Stagira was founded in 655 BC by Ionian settlers from Andros. Xerxes I of Persia occupied it in 480 BC. The city later joined the Delian League, led by Athens, but left in 424 BC during the Peloponnesian War. As a result, the Athenian strategos Cleon laid siege to it in 422 BC. Cleon died in the same year at the battle of Amphipolis and the city remained on the Spartan side for the rest of the Peloponnesian War.

In 348 BC, Philip II of Macedon occupied and destroyed the city. In return for Aristotle's tutoring of his son Alexander, Philip later rebuilt the city and resettled the old city's inhabitants. Many new structures were built at this time, including an aqueduct, two shrines to Demeter, and many houses.

Tradition has it that the natives of Stageira transferred Aristotle's remains to the city, buried it there, and founded a festival in his honour which was called "Aristoteleia".

The Danish archaeologist Karl Frederik Kinch made several explorations of Chalkidiki in 1886, and he identified the site of Stagira based on ancient descriptions of it.

Today, the archaeological site of Stagira is open to the public and constitutes an important cultural landmark in the region of Chalkidiki. The site's connection with Aristotle continues to attract visitors to the area.

== Notable people ==
- Aristotle, philosopher also known as Stagirite
- Hipparchus (Ἵππαρχος), philosopher, acquaintance and kin of Aristotle
- Nicomachus, father of Aristotle and doctor
- Arimneste, sister of Aristotle
- Nicomachus, son of Aristotle and philosopher
- Herpyllis, companion (and potentially second wife) of Aristotle and the mother of Nicomachus
- Nicanor of Stageira

== See also ==
- List of ancient Greek cities
- Aigai, Macedon
- Pella
- Mieza
