= House of Egibi =

Ancient Babylonian family

The House of Egibi was a family from within ancient Babylonia who were, amongst other things, involved in mercantile activities.

The family’s financial activities are known to archaeologists via an archive of about 1,700 clay tablets spanning five generations of the family, dating to a period from around 600 to 482 BCE. The tablets give us a glimpse of the exchange of goods within southern Mesopotamia and abroad. Many documents found in the archive show shipments of barley, dates, and other bulk items. Enterprises of this nature were financed by the house of Egibi, among other later houses from within Babylon.

== Familial identity ==
The word Egibi is a transliteration of the Sumerian e.gi-ba-ti.la, a full form used occasionally in archival records. In a text on ancestral names, Babylonian scribes equated it to Sin-taqisha-liblut, which is translated as 'O Sin (the moon god), you have given (the child), may he now live and thrive'. The family's name occurs in Babylonian records at a time beginning sometime during the eighth century BCE. By the sixth century BCE more than 200 individuals are known to history who claimed to be descendants of Egibi.

The founder of the house was thought in earlier scholarship to be an individual known called Jacob, therefore of Jewish origin (Rainey; A. H. Sayce; Delitzsch), thought at one time being active at the earliest during the late 7th century. F. El Peiser (1897) thought the family had nothing to do with Jacob and under later reconsideration the issue with regards to Jacob is thought inconclusively proven by Wallis Budge. The family are thought instead active during the 9th century BCE (Boardman, Edward, Hammond 1991), and being proved instead Sumero-Babylonian origin not Jewish.

== Members of the family ==
The head of the house during 528 BCE was Itti-Marduk-balatu, active in Opis during that time (Darius I began in reign during 520 BCE). The inheritance of the house was divided amongst sons of the family during 508. Itti-mardu-balāțu (son to Nabū-Aẖẖē-iddin) passed his inheritance to three sons. The eldest Marduk-nāṣir-apli received half, Nergel-ušēzib and Nab-(a)ḫḫē-bulliț the remainder divided between them. Marduk-nāșir-apli was presumably the head during the period 521 to 487 BCE. In the chronology of Moore and Lewis the house Egibi is contemporary with Iranu.

== Families activities ==
A business house of Neo-Babylonia and Achaemenid Babylonia, the earliest known to archaeology, were involved in selling, buying and exchanging houses, fields, slaves and banking operations; as creditors, accepted deposits for safe keeping, financing international trade, and founding commercial companies. All monies the members of the family used for these purposes were from the houses' own monies rather than the members of the family instead using money which they had from deposits made by others. They accepted deposits, provided loans, paid off clients' debt, and enabled the acquisition of goods for future payment by providing credit. The family was very successful in its trade of agricultural products, which enabled it to acquire large tracts of land, and some of its members became leading officials in Babylon.

The family were involved in land management sometime between 518 and 501 for the treasurer to the king.

A notable ruler who helped the House of Egibi become more powerful was Nebuchadnezzar II (c. 605 BCE – 562 BCE). Nebuchadnezzar formed his military by giving people land, allowing people to possibly free up time to not farm, therefore a need for farming the land was brought up. This is where the house of Egibi came in. They were a form of property management during the reign of Nebuchadnezzar in the Neo-Babylonian period. This let the men who owned land go and fight in the military for Nebuchadnezzar's purposes.

Some of members also were employed by Persian royalty (for instance Nebo-akkhi-idin as judges).

== The Egibi archive ==
The archive are tablets documenting five generations of the family's life, written by its members beginning in 602 BCE and ending in 486 BCE. The earlier generations of Egibis derived their wealth from agricultural activity rather than participation in temple based employment. The Nūr-Sin (577-480 BCE) are documented in the Egibi archive.

The archive was discovered sometime during the late 19th to early 20th century, the very large number of archaeological artifacts (the largest extant source from Neo-Babylonia) pertain to the firm at a time beginning during the time of Ashur-ahu-iddina (680-669 BCE).

During the time of Theophilus G. Pinches, the known tablets related to a period 605-517 BCE.

J.N.Strassmier and A.Ungnad made separate copies of various texts, including some of the Egibi archive.

Pinches at some time translated at least a portion of the Egibi Tablets.
