= Nicomachus (son of Aristotle) =

Ancient Greek philosopher, son of Aristotle

Nicomachus (Greek: Νικόμαχος; fl. c. 325 BC) was the son of Aristotle. The Suda states that Nicomachus was from Stageira, was a philosopher, a pupil of Theophrastus, and, according to Aristippus, his lover. He may have written a commentary on his father's lectures in physics. Nicomachus was born to Herpyllis, and his father's will commended his care as a boy to several tutors, then to his adopted son, Nicanor. Historians think the Nicomachean Ethics, a compilation of Aristotle's lecture notes, was probably named after or dedicated to Aristotle's son. However, Nicomachus is also believed to be the name of Aristotle's father. Several ancient authorities may have conflated Aristotle's ethical works with the commentaries that Nicomachus wrote on them. Ancient sources indicate that Nicomachus died in battle while still a "lad".
