= Hermias of Atarneus =

Greek tyrant of Atarneus (died 341/0 BC)

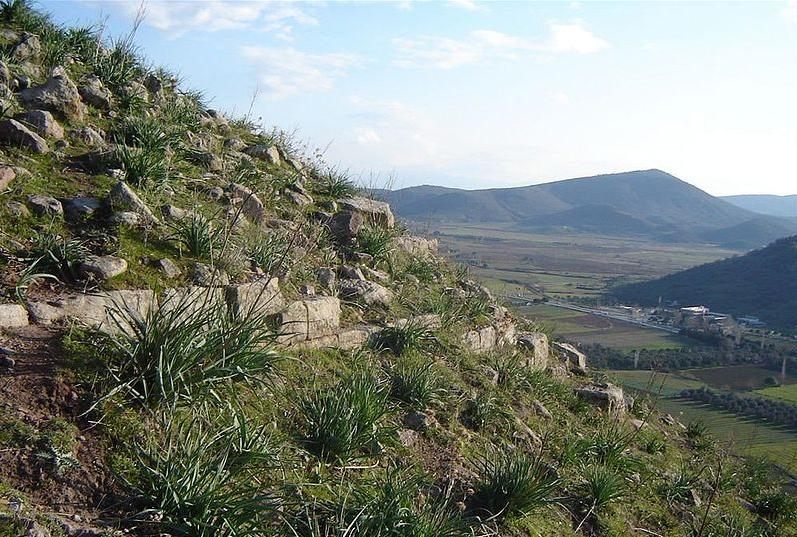
Ruins of Atarneus

Hermias of Atarneus (/ˈhɜːrmiəs/; Greek: Ἑρμίας ὁ Ἀταρνεύς; died 341/0 BC) was a Greek tyrant of Atarneus, and Aristotle's father-in-law.

The first mention of Hermias is as a slave to Eubulus, a Bithynian banker who ruled Atarneus. Hermias eventually won his freedom and inherited the rule of Atarneus. Due to his policies, his control expanded to other neighbouring cities, such as Assos, in Asia Minor.

In his youth, Hermias had studied philosophy in Plato's Academy. There he first met Aristotle. After Plato's death in 347 BC, Xenocrates and Aristotle travelled to Assos under the patronage of Hermias. Aristotle founded his first philosophical school there and eventually married Pythias, Hermias' daughter or niece.

Hermias' towns were among those that revolted against Persian rule. In 341/0 BC, the Persian King, Artaxerxes III, sent Memnon of Rhodes to reconquer these coastal cities. Under the guise of truce, Memnon tricked Hermias into visiting him, whereupon he bound Hermias in chains and sent him to Susa. Hermias was tortured, presumably for Memnon to learn more about Philip of Macedon's upcoming invasion plans. Hermias' dying words were that he had done nothing unworthy of philosophy.

After Hermias' death, Aristotle dedicated a statue in Delphi and composed a Hymn to Virtue in Hermias' honour.

== Early life ==
Hermias of Atarneus had surprisingly humble origins given the amount of political prestige and recognition he would gain in the later years of his life. Although his date of birth remains unknown, he is first mentioned as a Bithynian slave to Eubulus, a wealthy banker and despotic tyrant of the lands surrounding Assos and Atarneus, two commercial towns on the Troad coastline of Asia Minor. While several ancient historians, such as Theopompus, claimed that Hermias was a eunuch, modern historians discredit these claims as nothing more than attempts to blacken his reputation. Although Hermias was considered a slave, he was extremely valued, respected and privileged. At an early age, Hermias was sent to Athens to study under Plato and Aristotle for several years. It was during these years of his formal education that Hermias developed a strong and intimate friendship with Aristotle.

During the first years of Hermias' life the Greek states were going through a transitional phase that would lead to the colossal expansion of Macedonian power in the form of the Macedonian Empire, led by Philip II of Macedon and Alexander the Great. During this period of time, most neighbouring powers faced major internal strife and disorder. During the early to mid-4th century BC, the power of the Greek city-states continued to dwindle in the aftermath of the Peloponnesian War while the Macedonian Kingdom to the north remained embroiled in dynastic conflicts. Likewise, the once-great Persian Empire was hampered by internal feuds and revolts and incompetent leaders, resulting in losses of some western territories as lands in Asia Minor began to revolt or cede from the empire (such as the despotic government created by Eubulus).

== Mature life ==
After the completion of his education in Athens, Hermias returned to Atarneus to rule in partnership with Eubulus. However, not long after their reunion, Eubulus died, leaving Hermias to succeed as despotic ruler in about 351 BC. In control of a large expanse of territory, Hermias began to attract the attention of neighbouring powers as his domain continued to expand. Eager to launch expansive campaigns into Thrace and possibly Persia, Philip II of Macedon viewed Hermias as a useful prospective ally. Offering a strategic launching point for Macedonian invasions, an alliance with Hermias seemed vital.

Taking advantage of their past friendship, King Philip ordered Aristotle “to proceed to Asia Minor and join Hermias of Atarneus for political or imperialistic reasons”. Having taken leave from Athens due to rising resentment towards Macedonians as well as the death of Plato in 347 BC, Aristotle agreed to travel to Asia Minor, as requested by King Philip. Accompanied by fellow philosopher Xenocrates, Aristotle received a warm welcome and immediately began establishing political ties between King Philip and Hermias.

One surprising aspect of Hermias's life is the amount of influence Aristotle was able to exert on his decisions. While originally ruling his lands with a strict despotism, Aristotle's arrival in Atarneus was quickly followed by a governmental shift to more Platonic methods, as well as a milder tyranny. Not only did these changes win Hermias the support of neighbouring peoples, they also managed to increase his territory into much of the coastal countryside.

As time passed, Hermias began to fear a Persian invasion of Asia Minor. Indeed, while he had grown up during a period of incompetent Persian leaders and rampant internal conflicts, the ascension of Artaxerxes III Ochus to the throne of Persia in 358 BC promised eventual confrontation as the new king was determined to regain lands lost to revolt and secession from the Persian Empire.

== Death ==
Although Hermias could have benefited greatly from a strong Macedonian military force protecting his borders from a Persian invasion, King Philip suddenly ceased his military support with Hermias as a result of Athenian threats to attack Macedonia with the assistance of Persian forces if the Macedonians continued with plans to invade Asia Minor. This change of plan by Philip II left Hermias to a cruel fate. In order to regain the lost Persian territory in Asia Minor and try and discover Macedonian invasion plans, Artaxerxes III commissioned a Greek mercenary named Mentor. (While some believed Hermias' captor to be Memnos of Rhodes, historian Diodoros claims that it was in fact his brother Mentor.) Mentor was charged with the task of capturing Hermias and therefore restoring his lands to the Persian Empire.

Disgusted with the actions taken by King Philip, Aristotle began to write letters to persuade Mentor to change sides. Although he eventually agreed in order to secure the support of Hermias, Mentor seized the next opportune moment to capture him and sent Hermias to Susa in chains. Once in Susa, Hermias was tortured in a vain attempt to extract information regarding King Philip's invasion plans. Refusing to betray his colleagues, his last words were said to have been “tell my friends that I have done nothing shameful or unworthy of philosophy”. His death occurred in 341/0 BC. His final statement displayed the magnitude of Hermias' friendship with Aristotle as well as the influence of Aristotle's philosophy on his life. After his death, Aristotle created a memorial at Delphi commemorating Hermias’ loyalty and wrote a hymn to his name. Aristotle also reserved the right to marry Hermias' niece or daughter, Pythias, once she came of age.

=== Hymn in honour of Hermias ===
Diogenes Laërtius: “And the hymn in honour of Hermias is as follows”...

O Virtue, won by earnest strife,
And holding out the noblest prize
That ever gilded earthly life,
Or drew it on to seek the skies;
For thee what son of Greece would not
Deem it an enviable lot,
To live the life, to die the death
That fears no weary hour, shrinks from no fiery breath?

Such fruit hast thou of heavenly bloom,
A lure more rich than golden heap,
More tempting than the joys of home,
More bland than spell of soft-eyed sleep.
For thee Alcides, son of Jove,
And the twin boys of Leda strove,
With patient toil and sinewy might,
Thy glorious prize to grasp, to reach thy lofty height.

Achilles, Ajax, for thy love
Descended to the realms of night;
Atarneus' King thy vision drove,
To quit for aye the glad sun-light,
Therefore, to memory's daughters dear,
His deathless name, his pure career,
Live shrined in song, and link'd with awe,
The awe of Xenian Jove, and faithful friendship's law.

—Aristotle (translated by C.D. Yonge)

== Hermias' historical contribution ==
Although Hermias played only a small role in the politics of his time, the details of his death had serious historical repercussions. Having kept in contact with King Philip through the presence of Aristotle, Hermias likely knew the specifics of Philip's invasion plans for Thrace, Asia Minor and Persia.

Even after being betrayed by King Philip, Hermias displayed great loyalty to Philip in his refusal to divulge any information about Philip's plans to the Persians. This steadfast devotion to his allies protected the secrecy of the Macedonian invasion plans and most likely played a useful role in the later ease of Alexander's expansion into the lands of the Persian Empire.

Another of Hermias’ significant contributions was the insight gained through his accounts (as recorded by Aristotle) of the social and political events of the fourth century BC Greek and Persian states. A knowledgeable witness active in the political power struggle of the time, accounts of Hermias' life offer information regarding the political circumstances that facilitated the Macedonian conquests of Greece and then Persia. This included the diminishing power and general disorder of the Greek city states and the Persian empire. While the turmoil in the aftermath of the Peloponnesian War prevented the Greek city-states from maintaining their influence as a Mediterranean power, internal conflicts and incompetency led to a steady reduction in Persian power and territory. By ending its dynastic conflicts and uniting under King Philip, Macedonia was able to assert itself as a stable and formidable kingdom capable of vast expansion of the lands under its control. Hermias’ accounts offer a useful source of information for this period. While history is commonly determined by the victor, Hermias’ strong friendship with Aristotle preserved his story as he was constantly mentioned in Aristotle's writing. If it were not for this strong bond, Hermias’ existence would have been forgotten, and his effects on the politics of the time neglected.

== Views about Hermias ==
As little is known of Hermias' life apart from the accounts of Aristotle, there are few sources of past historical interpretations. Due to his Bythinian origins, early Greek historians such as Theopompus and Theocritus regarded him as a barbarian. Declaring him a barbaric tyrant, they made attempts to blacken his reputation, such as spreading the rumour that he was a eunuch. The negative criticism by Theocritus and Theopompus could be due to his taking over the rule of Atarneus. As both historians were born in Chion, an island whose territory once included Atarneus, their resentment towards Hermias is understandable. Threatened by a Macedonian invasion from the north, most of the Greek city-states condemned Hermias because of his connections to King Philip. Even Aristotle was forced to leave Athens as he had connections with both rulers. While immediate historians rebuked Hermias for his affiliations with Macedonia, later studies of Aristotle's writing led to a more sympathetic view of the tyrant.

More modern interpretations suggest that Hermias was an intelligent ruler, who suffered his harsh fate because he was betrayed. Joseph M. Bryant states that his significance is rooted in his attempts to “bring philosophy to power”. Influenced by his academy-based education as well as his numerous philosopher friends, Hermias gradually relaxed his harsh tyranny, leaving in place a government based on Platonic principles.
