= Callistratus (jurist) =

Callistratus, a Roman jurist, who, as appears from passages in Justinian's Digest, wrote at least as late as the reign (AD 198–211) of Septimius Severus and Caracalla.

== Associations ==
In a passage of the Augustan History (Alex. Sev. 68) which, either from interpolation or from the inaccuracy of the author, abounds with anachronisms, Callistratus is stated to have been a disciple of Papinian, and to have been one of the council of Alexander Severus. This statement may be correct, notwithstanding the suspicious character of the source whence it is derived.

== Works ==
The numerous extracts from Callistratus in the Digest occupy eighteen pages in Hommel's Palingenesia Pandectarum; and the fact that he is cited by no other jurist in the Digest may be accounted for by observing that this work contains extracts from few jurists of importance subsequent to Callistratus. The extracts from Callistratus are taken from works bearing the following titles:

- Libri VI de Cognitionibus
- Libri VI Edicti Monitorii
- Libri IV de Jure Fisci, or de Jure Fisci et Populi
- Libri III Institutionum
- Libri II Quaestionum

The titles of the first three of these works require some explanation.

=== de Cognitionibus ===
This treatise relates to those causes which were heard, investigated, and decided by the emperor, the governor of a province, or other magistrate, without the intervention of judices. This departure from the ordinary course of the civil law took place, even before Diocletian's general abolition of the ordo judiciorum, sometimes by virtue of the imperial prerogative, and in some cases was regularly practiced for the purpose of affording equitable relief where the strict civil law gave no remedy, instead of resorting to the more tortuous system of legal fictions and equitable actions.

=== Edictum Monitorium ===
What is meant by the title of this work is by no means clear. Haubold (de Edictis Monitoriis ac Brevibus, Leipzig, 1804) thinks that monitory edicts are not special writs of notice or summons directed to the parties in the course of a cause, but those general clauses of the edictum perpetuum which relate to the law of procedure, giving actions and other remedies on certain conditions, and therefore, tacitly at least, containing warnings as to the consequences of irregularity or nonfulfilment of the prescribed conditions. The fragments of Callistratus certainly afford much support to this view. Haubold distinguishes the edictum monitorium from the edictum breve, upon which Paulus wrote a treatise. The latter he supposes to consist of those new clauses, which, in process of time, were added as an appendage to the edictum perpetuum, after the main body of it had acquired a constant form.

=== de Jure Fisci (et Populi) ===
The phrase de Jure Fisci et Populi appears anomalous, but it occurs elsewhere. (See Paulus, Recept. Sent. 5.12.) The Augustan History also (Alex. Sev. 15) says that Alexander Severus "leges de jure populi et fisci moderatas et infinitas (?) sanxit." Probably under the phrase "jus populi" must here be understood the law relating to the aerarium, or to the arca publica (which latter, practically as well as theoretically, was at the disposal of the senate) as distinguished from the fiscus, which was the emperor's own, not as res privata, but as property attached to the imperial dignity. (Augustan History, Aurelian 20.)
