= Proxenus of Atarneus =

Proxenus of Atarneus (Greek: Πρόξενος ὁ Ἀταρνεύς) is most famous for being Aristotle's guardian after the death of his parents. Proxenus educated Aristotle for a couple of years before sending him to Athens to Plato's Academy. He lived in Atarneus, a city in Asia Minor.

Proxenus had married Aristotle's older sister Arimneste, whereby they had a daughter Hero and a son Nicanor. Hero's own son, Callisthenes, would later become a student and collaborator with his great-uncle Aristotle. Nicanor eventually married Aristotle's daughter, Pythias.
