= Atarneus =

Ancient Greek city and archaeological site in modern Turkey

- Ἀταρνεύς (Ancient Greek)
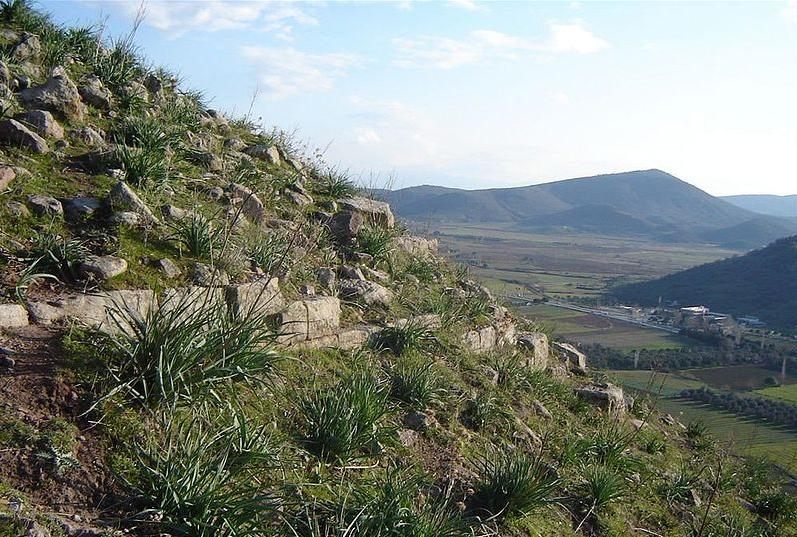
- A view of the plain near Dikili from the site of Atarneus

- Location within Turkey
- 39°05′29″N 26°55′15″E
- Type: Settlement
- Associated with: Hermias, Proxenus
- Location: Dikili, İzmir Province, Turkey
- Region: Aeolis

Atarneus (/əˈtɑːrniəs/; Ancient Greek: Ἀταρνεύς), also known as Atarna (Ἄταρνα) and Atarneites (Ἀταρνείτης), was an ancient Greek city in the region of Aeolis, Asia Minor. It lies on the mainland opposite the island of Lesbos. It was on the road from Adramyttium to the plain of the Caicus. Its territory was called the Atarneitis.

Atarneus seems to be the genuine original name, though Atarna, or Atarnea, and Aterne may have prevailed afterwards. Stephanus of Byzantium, who only gives the name Atarna, consistently makes the ethnic name Atarneus. Herodotus tells a story of the city and its territory, both of which were named Atarneus, being given to the Chians by Cyrus the Great, for their having surrendered to him Pactyes the Lydian. Stephanus and other ancient authorities consider Atarneus to be the Tarne written of in the Iliad by Homer; but perhaps incorrectly. The territory was a good corn country. Histiaeus the Milesian was defeated by the Persians at Malene in the Atarneitis, and taken prisoner. The place was occupied at a later time by some exiles from Chios, who from this strong position sallied out and plundered Ionia. Dercylidas besieged the city for eight months and at the end the citizens of the city accepted his terms. He appointed Dracon of Pellene in charge of the city.

Atarneus flowered in the 4th century BCE, when it was the seat of government of Hermias of Atarneus, a friend of Aristotle, ruling over the area from Atarneus to Assos. The city was deserted by inhabitants in the 1st century BCE, possibly following an outbreak of an unknown epidemic. Pausanias says that the same calamity befell the Atarneitae which drove the Myusii from their city; but as the position, of the two cities was not similar, it is not quite clear what he means. They left the place, however, if his statement is true; and Pliny the Elder, in his time, mentions Atarneus as no longer a city. Pausanias speaks of hot springs at Astyra, opposite to Lesbos, in the Atarneus.

The city is known by many for its association with the life of Aristotle. After the death of his father, Aristotle was cared for and educated by Proxenus of Atarneus, possibly an uncle of his. At the Academy Aristotle made friends with Hermias, who was later to become the ruler of Atarneus. Indeed, after the death of Plato, Aristotle went to stay with Hermias, subsequently marrying Hermias's niece Pythia.

According to Pliny the Elder, the Cetionis which was a transparent stone of many colours could be found in Atarneus.

Its site is located at Kale Tepe, northeast of the town of Dikili, Asiatic Turkey.
