= Pieter van Hanselaere =

Belgian painter

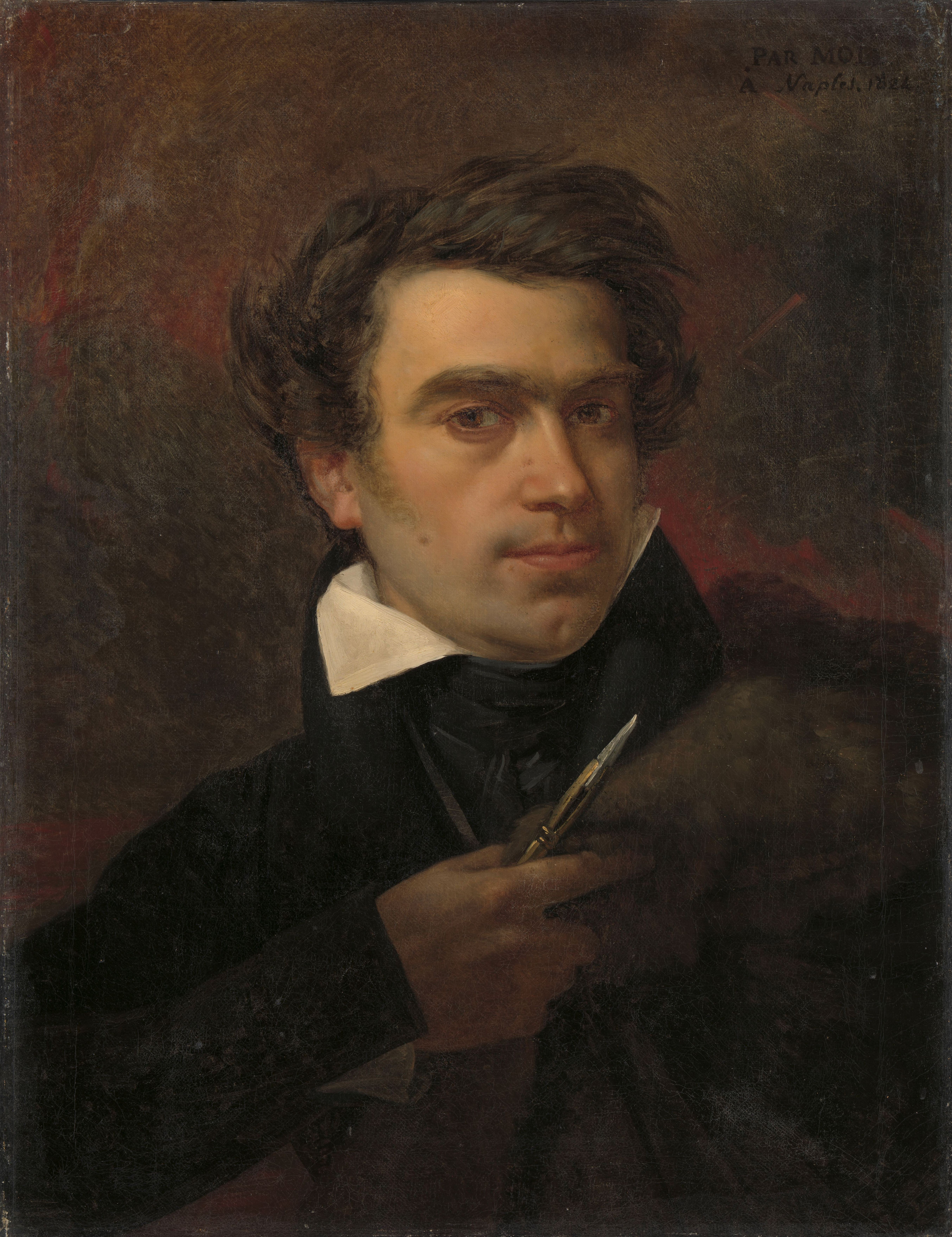
Pieter Van Hanselaere, self-portrait, 1824

Pieter van Hanselaere (Dutch pronunciation: [ˈpitər vɑn ˈɦɑnsəˌlaːrə]; 1786–1862), also credited as Pierre van Hanselaere (French pronunciation: [pjɛʁ]), was a Belgian painter in the neoclassical style, who specialized in portraits and religious and historical scenes.

== Biography ==
Pieter van Hanselaere was born in Ghent on 31 July 1786; he studied at the Academy of Ghent with Pierre Van Huffel, and then in Paris at the Académie royale de peinture et de sculpture with Jacques-Louis David, in 1809. In 1814 he was back in Ghent and competed for the prize in historical painting; winning it gave him the funds to travel to Italy.

In his early days he specialized in portraiture and achieved a high level of technical perfection. Due to the Napoleonic wars he was not able to leave for Italy until 1816; when he did, he first stayed in Rome and painted portraits of some high-ranking officials, before moving to Naples and achieving success there as well, becoming the painter for the royal court. In 1828 he returned to Ghent, where a position as professor had opened up, and competed with two others for the position; Suzanna and the elders was one of his contributions, and he was offered the position in 1829.

At the Academy of Ghent Cornelis Kimmel (1804-1877) and Pierre Olivier Joseph Coomans (1816–1889) were among his pupils. Van Hanselaere exhibited in many cities and had amassed a considerable fortune, allowing him to buy three houses in the Rue Courte du Marais. By 1844 he had finished his pièce capitale, a 24 by 16 foot painting depicting Philip van Artevelde and his army leaving Ghent to fight Louis II, Count of Flanders (1381). Critical response of the large and confused piece was negative, and van Hanselaere never fully recuperated from the disappointment. The death of his only son hastened him towards his death, on 10 March 1862.

Work of his was in the Rijksmuseum in Amsterdam in 1890.

== Selected works ==
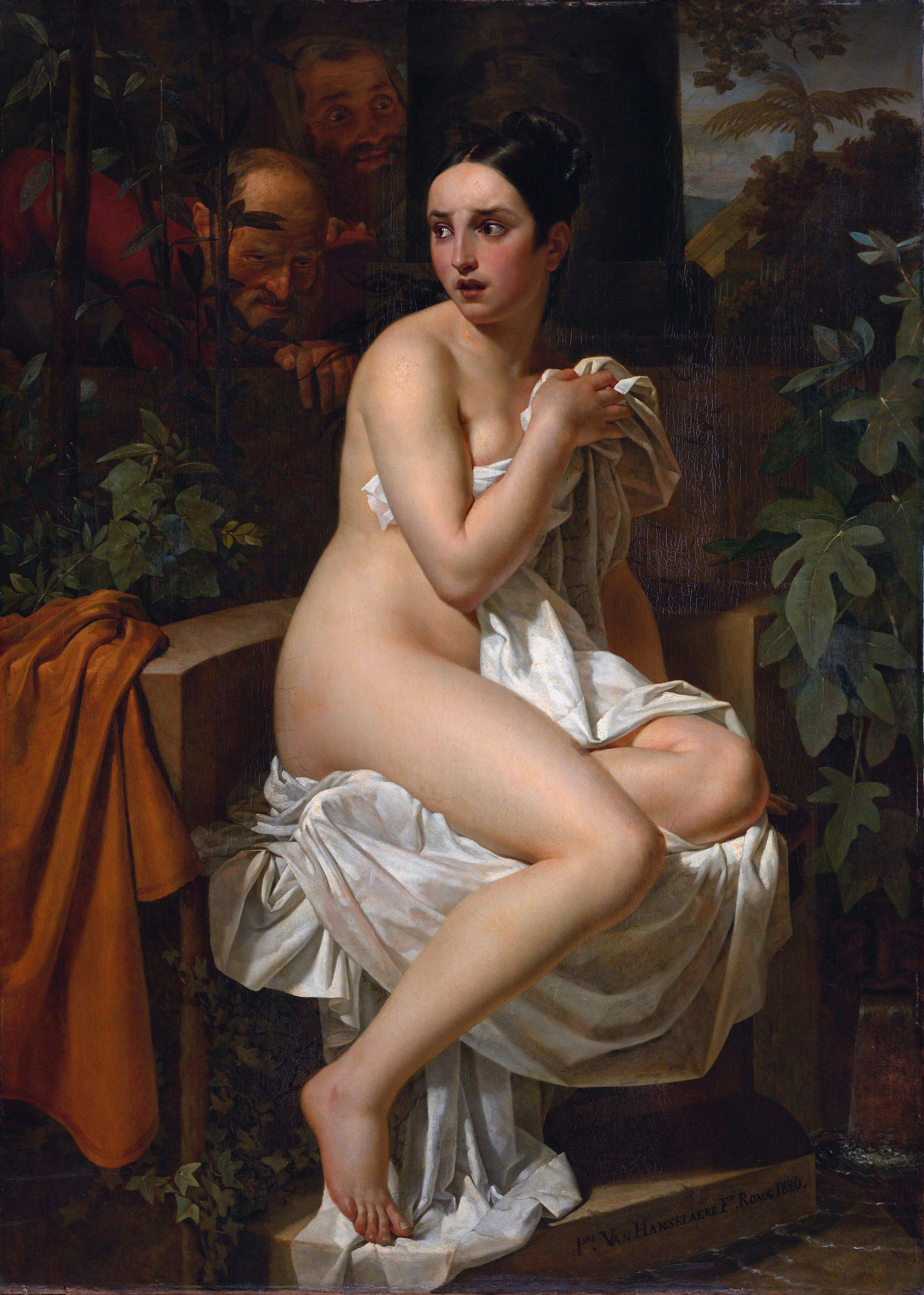
Suzanna and the elders

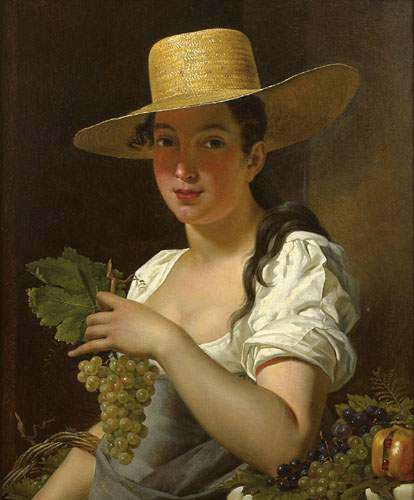
Young woman with hat and grapes

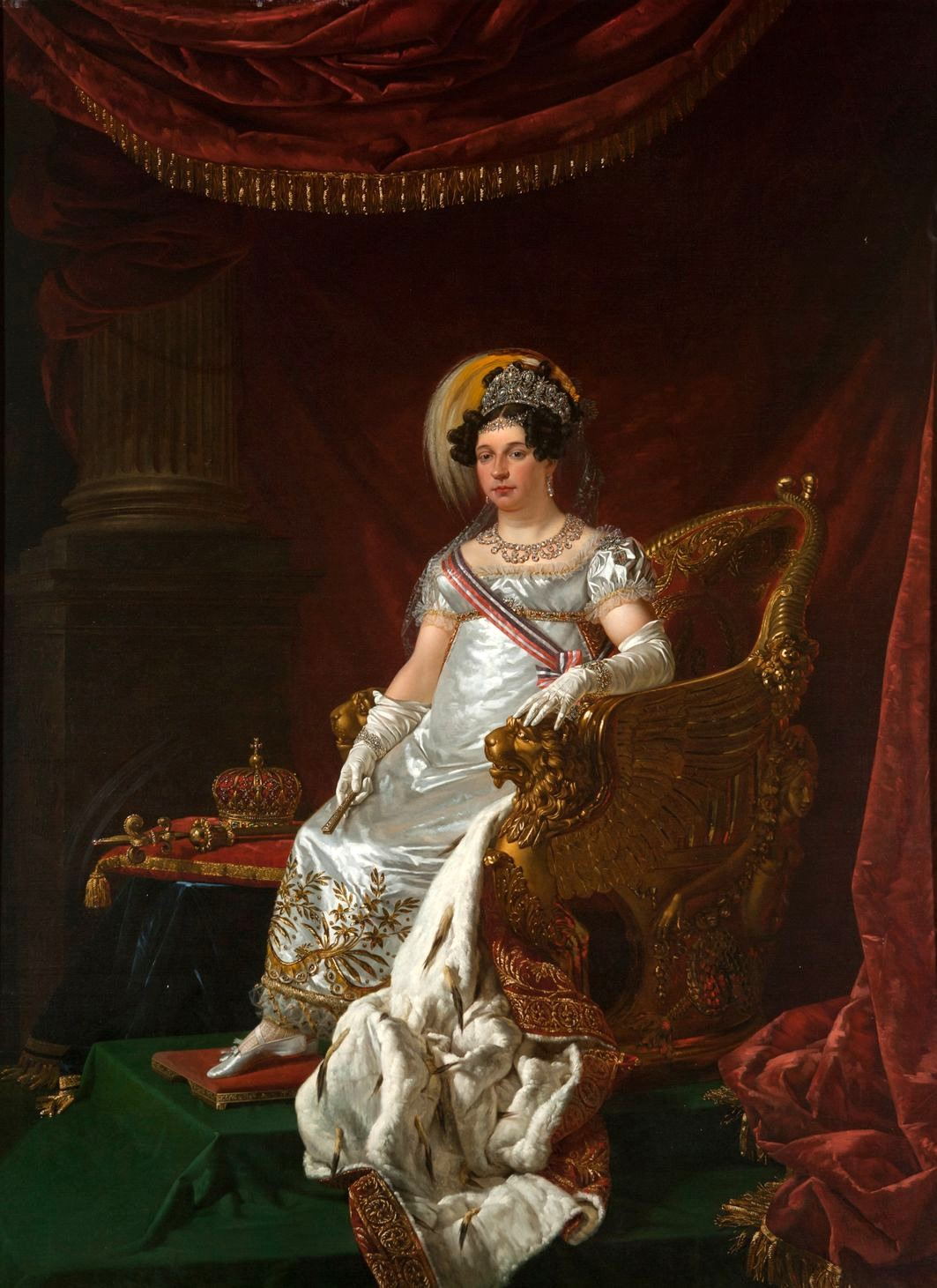
Infanta Maria Isabella

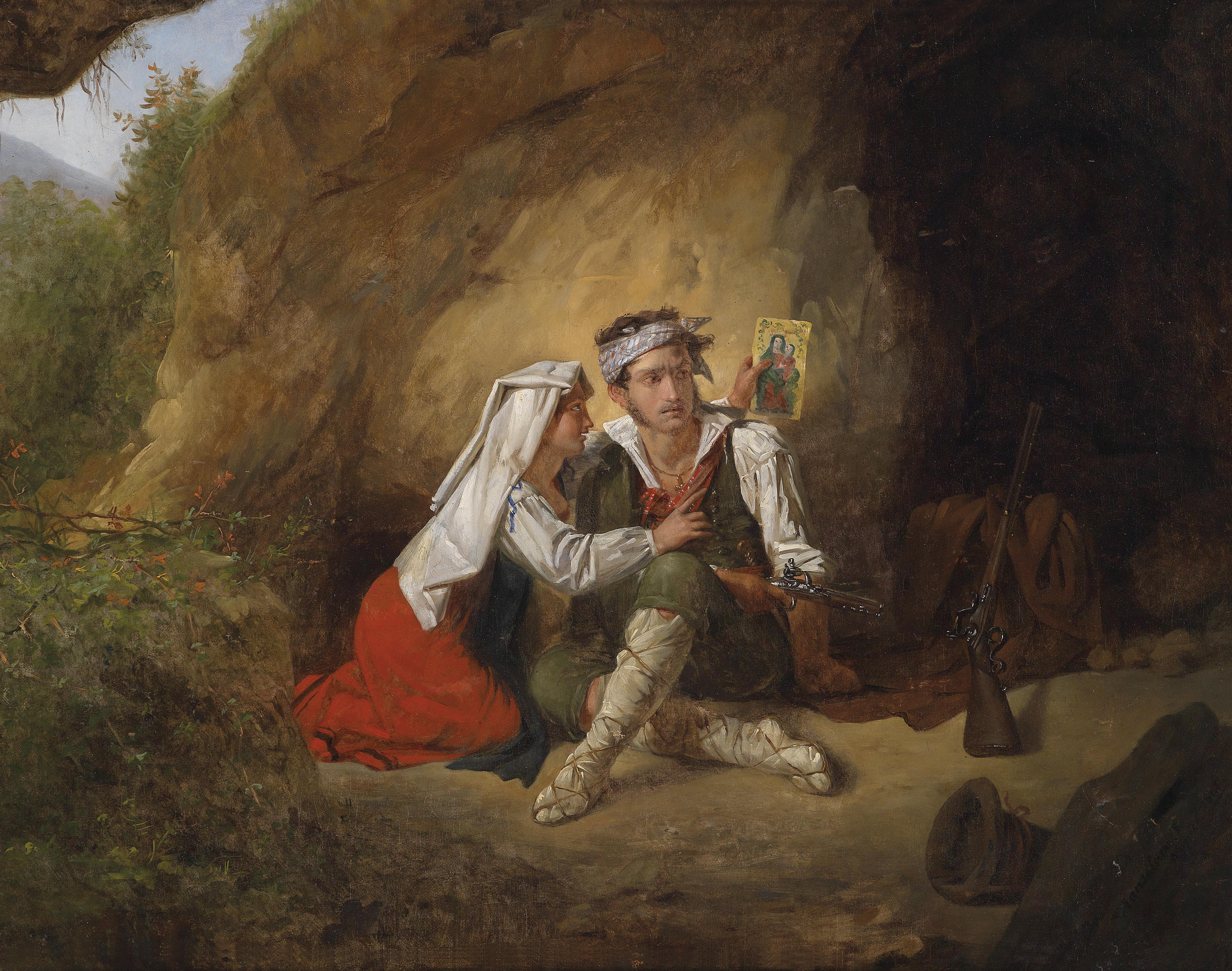
Exhortation before the battle
