= Pierre Olivier Joseph Coomans =

Belgian painter (1816–1889)

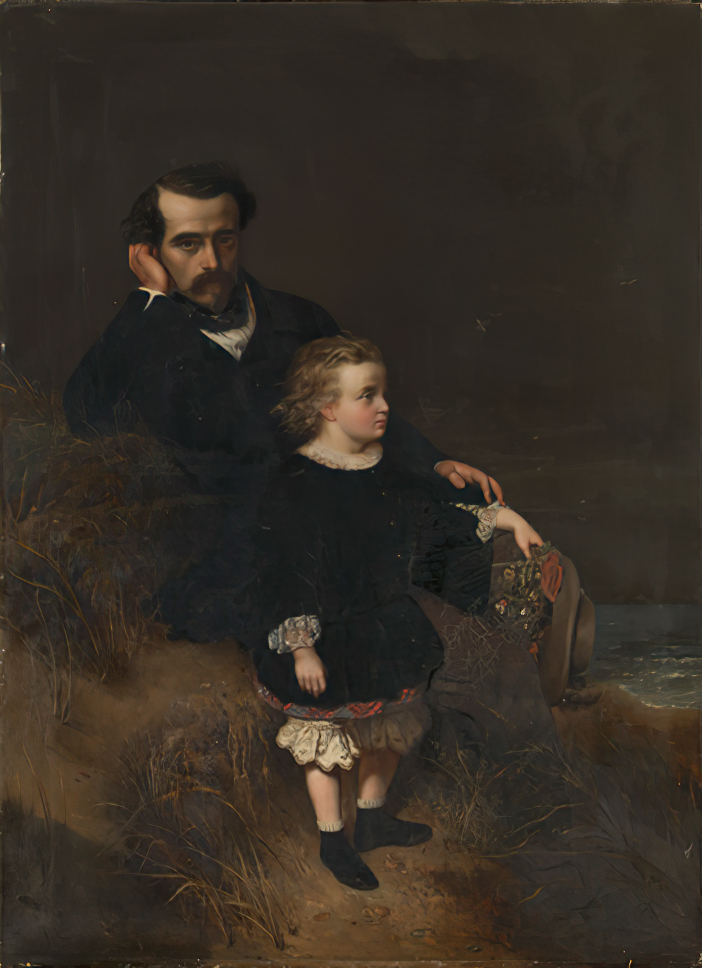
- Self-portrait with son Oscar
- Born: Pierre Olivier Joseph Coomans; 28 June 1816; Brussels, Belgium
- Died: 31 December 1889 (aged 73); Boulogne-Billancourt, France
- Education: Antwerp Academy
- Known for: Painting
- Notable work: Attila's Last Charge in the Plains of Châlons-sur-Marne
- Movement: Academicism, Romanticism, Neo-Pompeianism
- Spouse(s): Zoé van Male de Brachene, Adelaïde Lacroix
- Awards: Vermeil Medal, Brussels

Pierre Olivier Joseph Coomans (June 28, 1816 – December 31, 1889) was a painter and illustrator born in Brussels, United Kingdom of the Netherlands. He was the son of Josse-Joseph Coomans (1787–1868), inspector of registration and estates and author of novels and poetry, and Cécile Lesprit (1792–1871). He was known as one of Belgium's most celebrated 19th-century painters of historic subjects, genre scenes, and landscapes.

== Early career ==
Already a talented draftsman at the age of 16, Coomans studied painting under Pieter van Hanselaere in Ghent, exhibiting "A Young Greek Shepherd" at the first National Fine Arts Exhibition. Then he attended the academy at Antwerp and studied painting under the noted historical romanticists, Nicaise de Keyser (1813–1887) and Gustave Wappers (1803–1874). At the age of 19, he illustrated the History of Belgium written by his older brother with fifty-two engravings and worked on other historical titles as well. He also authored a novel based on Algerian history entitled Gzana.

== A Royal Commission and military service ==
In 1843, Queen Louise-Marie of Orleans sent him to Algeria to follow the French army in Kabylie. He was attached to the General Staff of Marshal Thomas-Robert Bugeaud and met the military painter Horace Vernet there. His three stays in Algeria (1843, 1844, and 1845) introduced Orientalism into his work focusing on North African landscapes, Arab portraits, Algerian dancers and battle scenes. He exhibited his Algerian subjects at art fairs in Antwerp and Brussels.

In 1847 he married the widow Zoé van Male de Brachene (1807–1848), whose husband, Captain Prosper Renoz, had died in Algeria. His son Oscar was born in 1848 but his wife died shortly after the birth, plunging the artist in a deep depression. Although his work, Attila's Last Charge in the Plains of Châlons-sur-Marne had garnered a vermeil medal in Brussels that year he did not paint for two years but traveled to Italy and Palestine. Then in 1854 and 1855, he joined his military friends from Algeria and served General Aimable Pélissier in the Crimean War as a military painter. During this period he painted historical medieval subjects and portraits. He worked with models both in studios and in exterior settings and his portraits, featuring exotic costumes, jewelry, and dusky sensual looks yet produced with a subtlety of tone and color were greatly prized by European collectors. He also painted children at play, a popular theme in late nineteenth-century European and American Art as childhood was studied in terms of its significance to personal development and education.

== Inspired by Pompeii ==
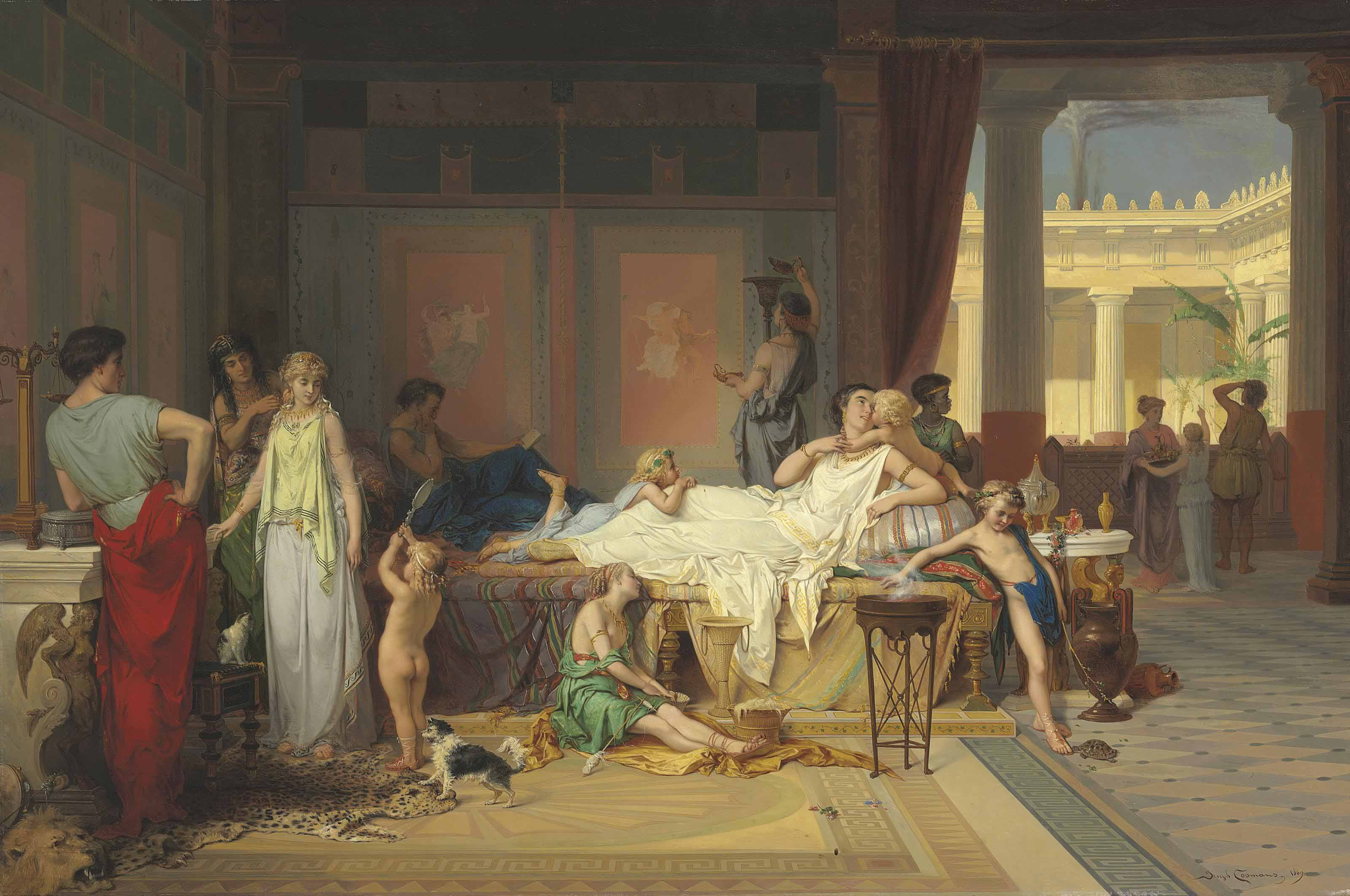
The Last Hour of Pompeii – The House of the Poet

In 1855, Coomans contracted cholera in Varna and left the battlefields to recuperate in Constantinople, then Greece, and Italy. He married Adelaïde Lacroix (1838–1884) in Albania in 1856 and the couple moved to Naples where they lived until 1860. There his exposure to the excavations in Pompeii inspired him to create genre paintings of antiquity in the Neo-Pompeian style. Coomans moved to Paris in 1860, where his daughter Heva was born on May 2, 1860. His second daughter, Diana, was born on August 16, 1861. Coomans exhibited regularly at the Paris Salons and his scenes of family life in ancient Rome sold well. His wealth enabled him to build a Pompeian villa of his own on a piece of land next to the Bois de Boulogne between 1874 and 1877 although the structure is no longer extant. Critics thought despite their pictorial virtuosity, intimacy and rigorous compositions, his Pompeian subjects did not have the breadth of his romantic painting, nor the grandiloquent character of the compositions of Jean-Léon Gérôme, nor the fascinating eroticism of Lawrence Alma-Tadema, the two recognized masters of the Pompeian genre. His work achieved international success, though, thanks to its photographic and lithographic reproductions. He also instructed and greatly influenced his two daughters, who both became successful painters as well, specializing, like their father, in portrayals of inhabitants of ancient Pompeii with their father's manner and feeling of color.

== A final trip to America ==
In October 1888 at the age of 72, Coomans and his daughters embarked on an extended trip to Philadelphia and New York. There, he and his talented daughters became favorites of New York society. But the trip home in June 1889 exhausted him and he died on December 31, 1889, in Boulogne-on-Seine, France. He is buried in the old cemetery of Boulogne-Billancourt.

== Gallery ==
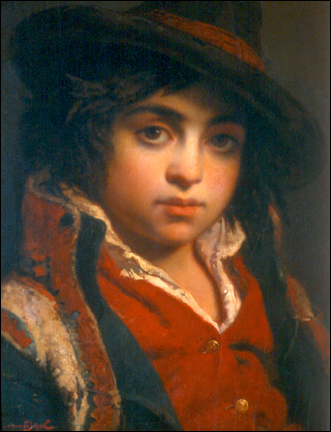
Young Peasant Boy

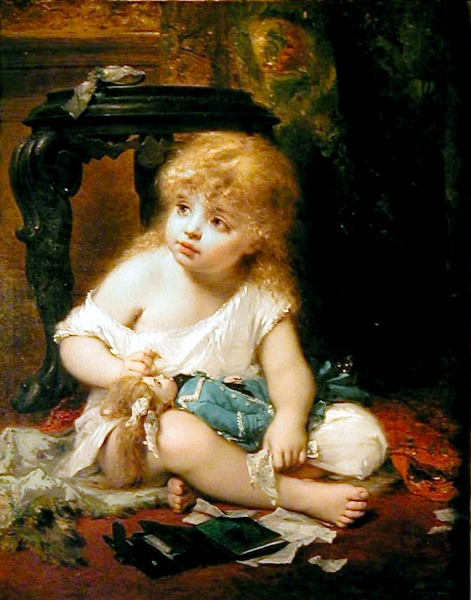
Girl with a doll

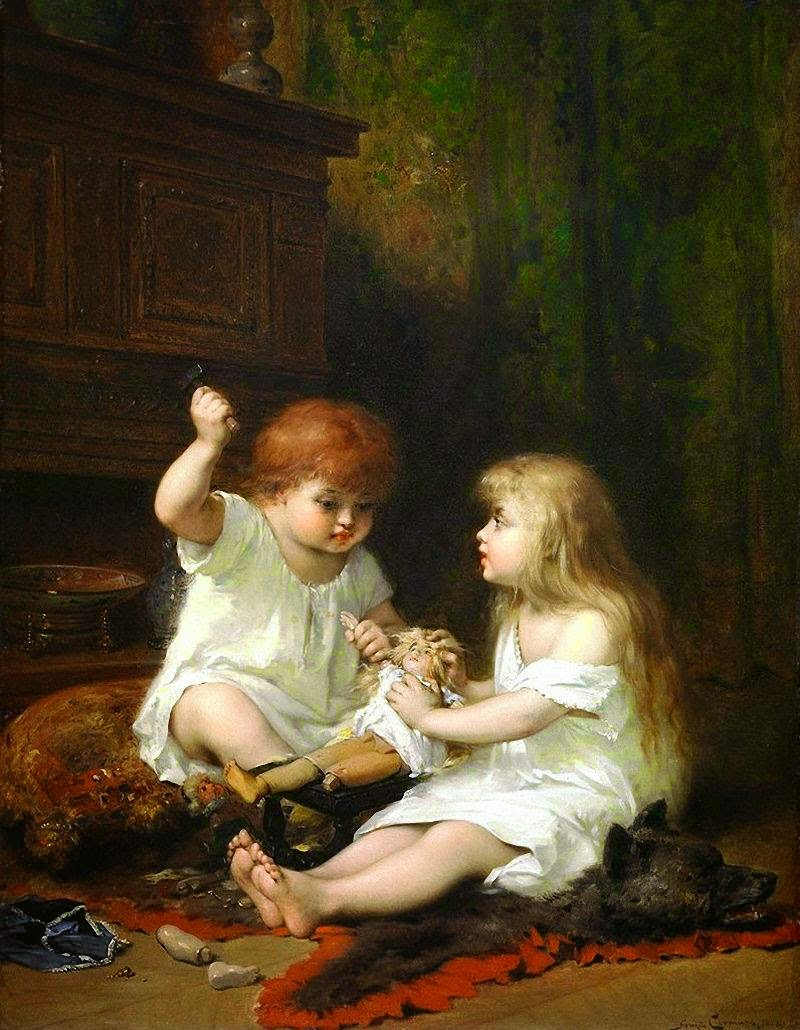
Kinder

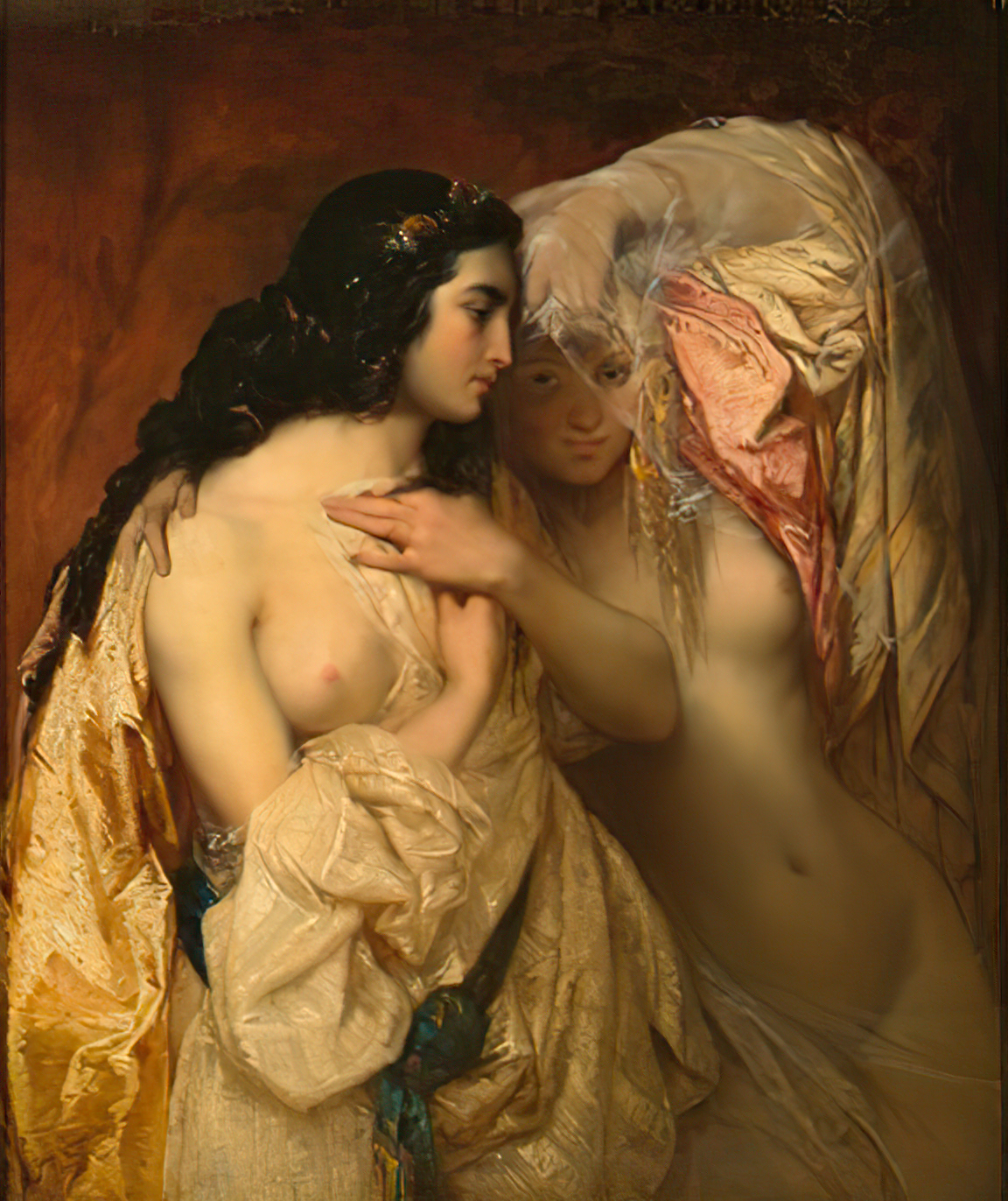
Mystery of Love

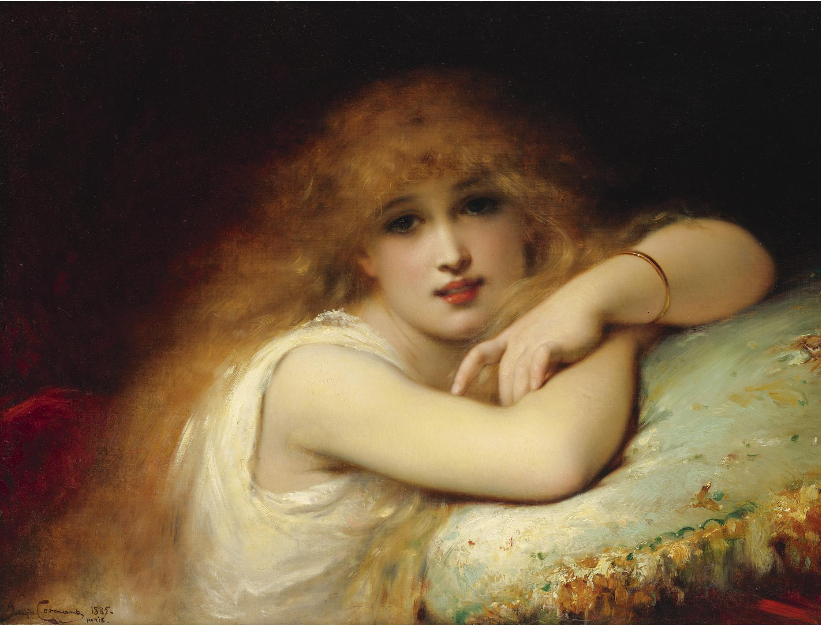
A young woman of leisure

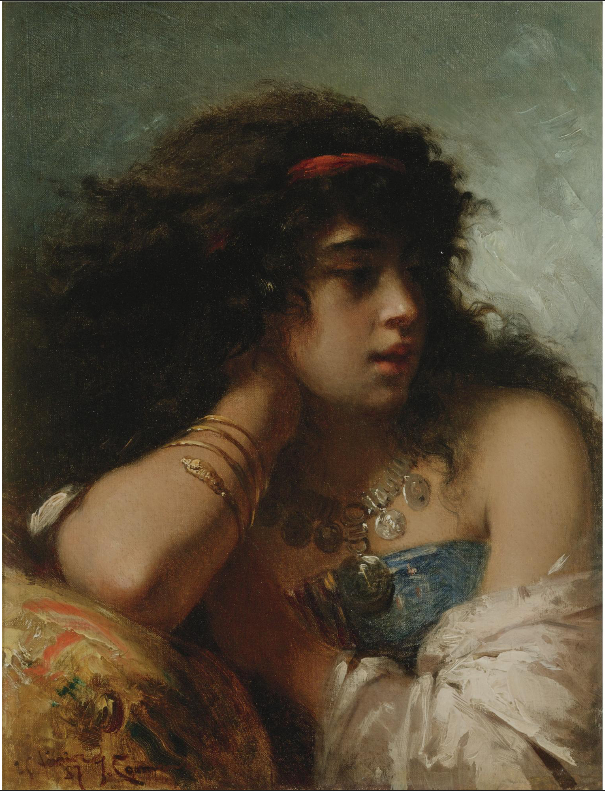
Odalisque

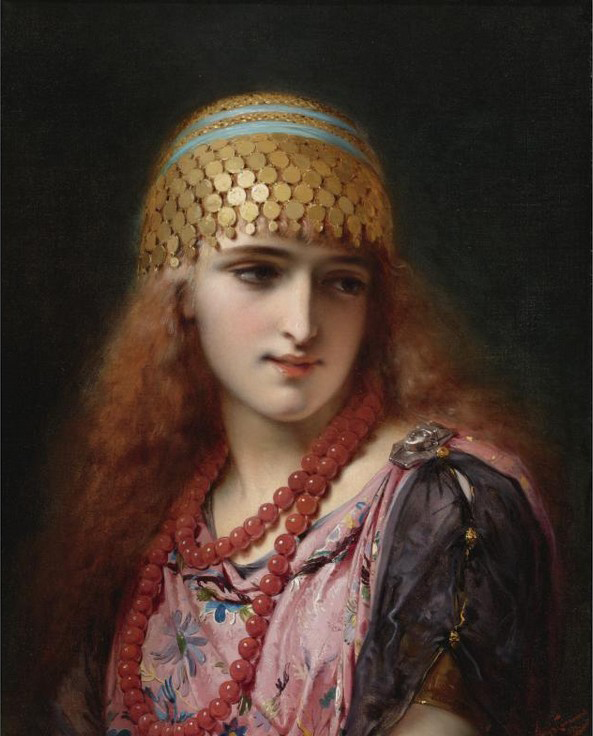
An oriental beauty, 1879

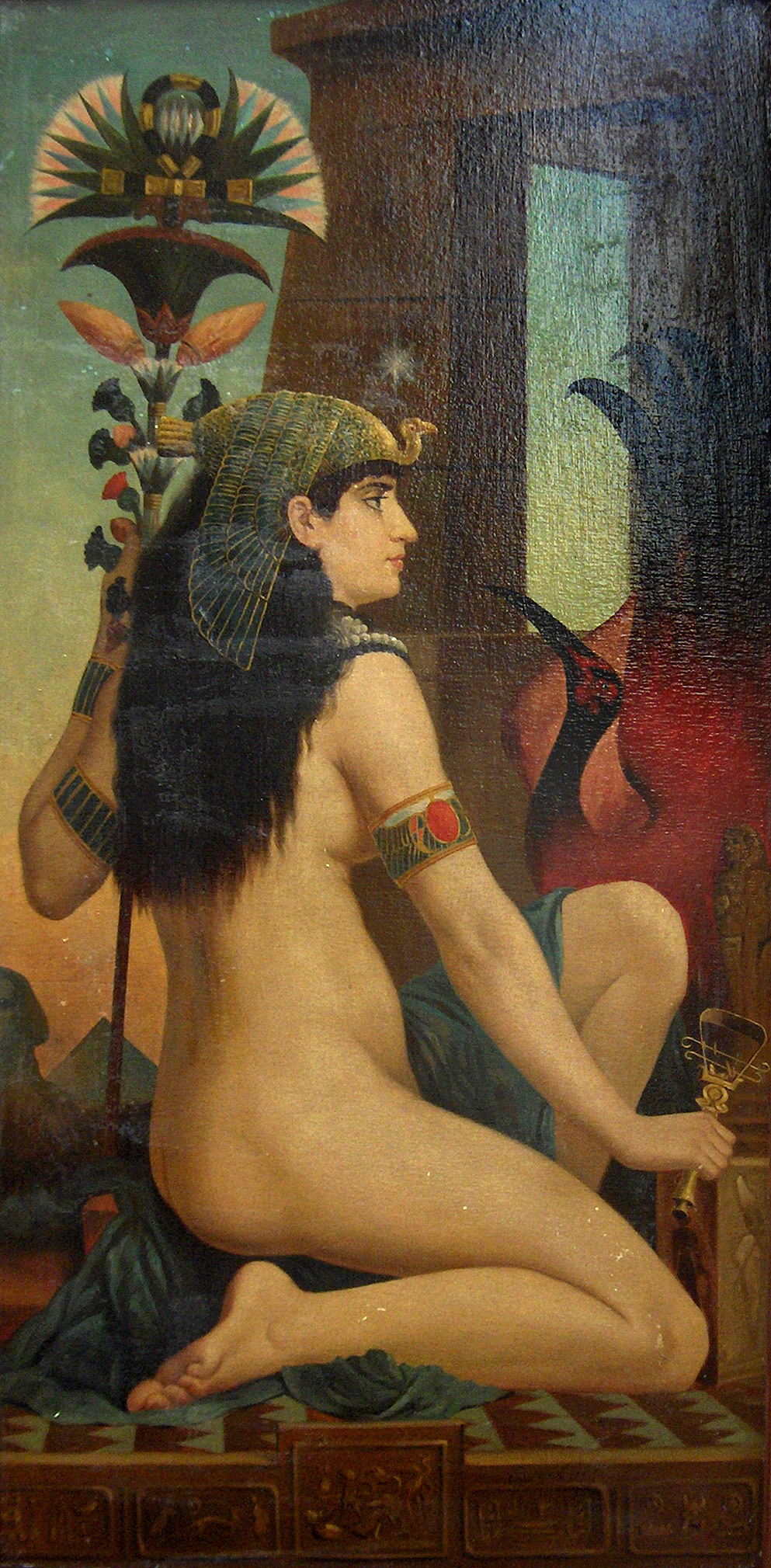
Cleopatra

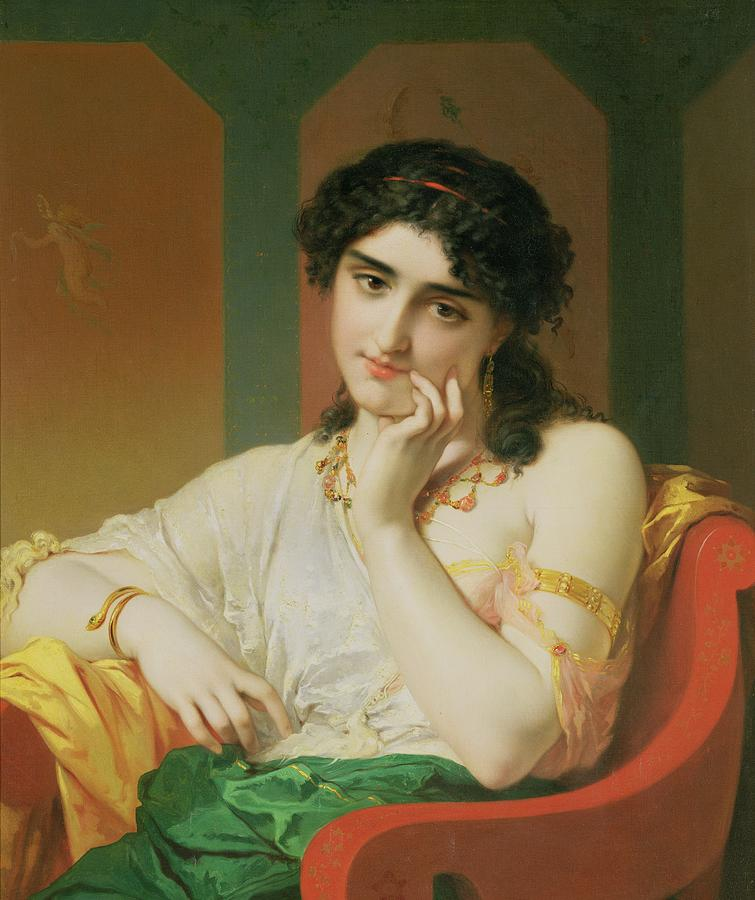
A classical beauty

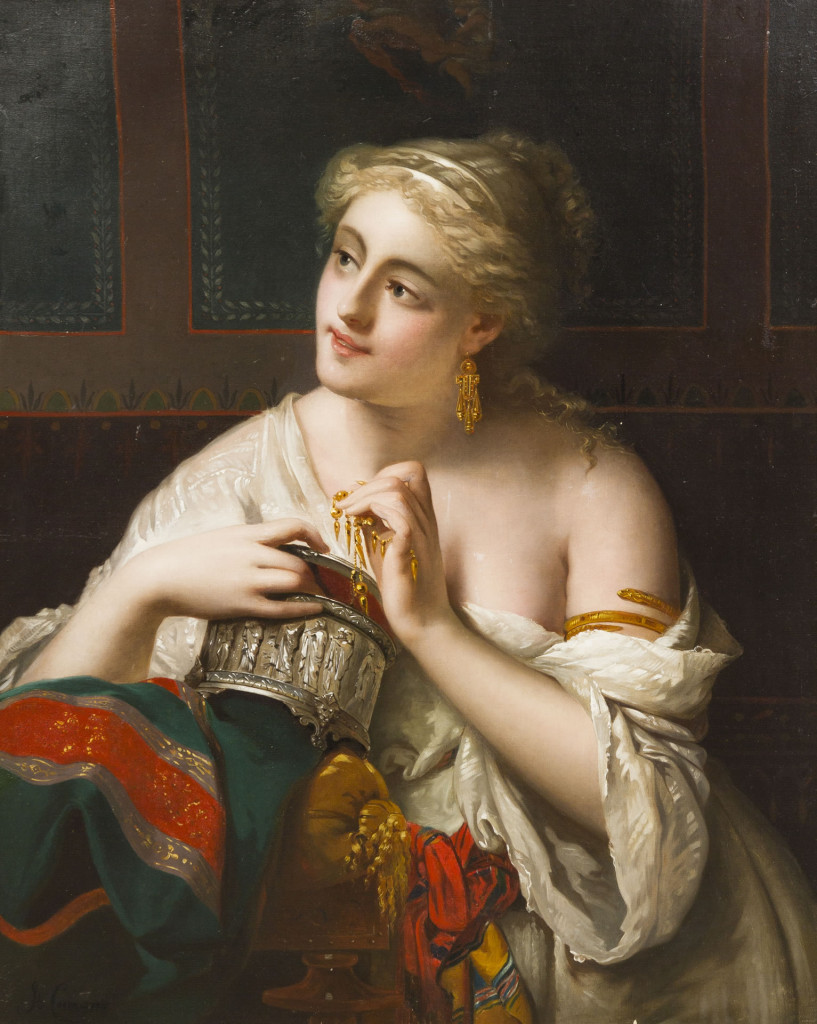
The jewellery box

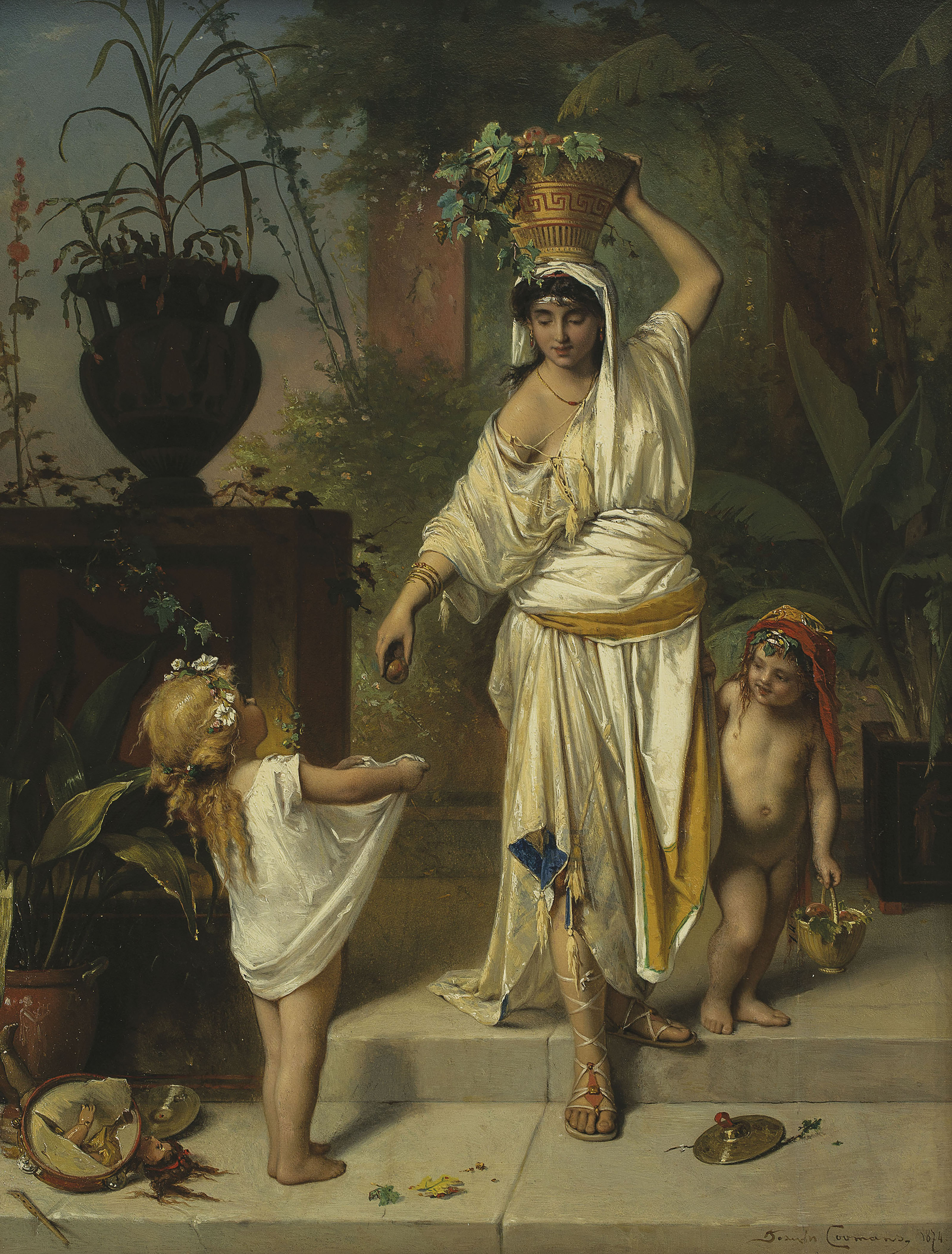
Return from the grape harvest

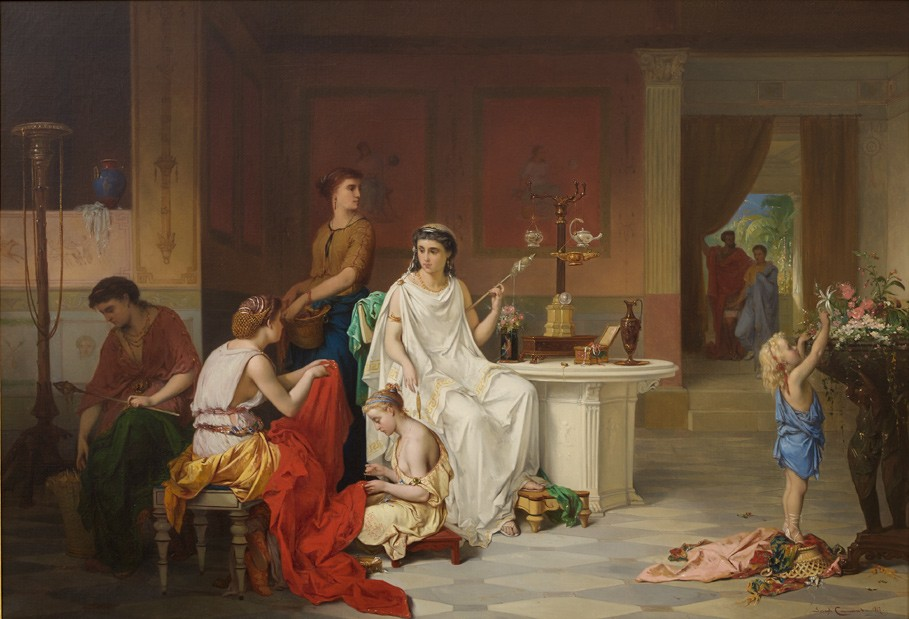
Preparing for the festival

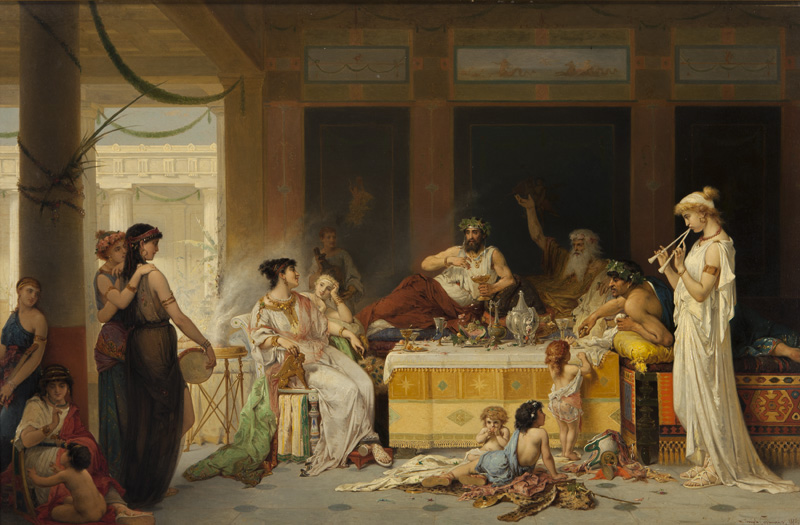
Roman banquet

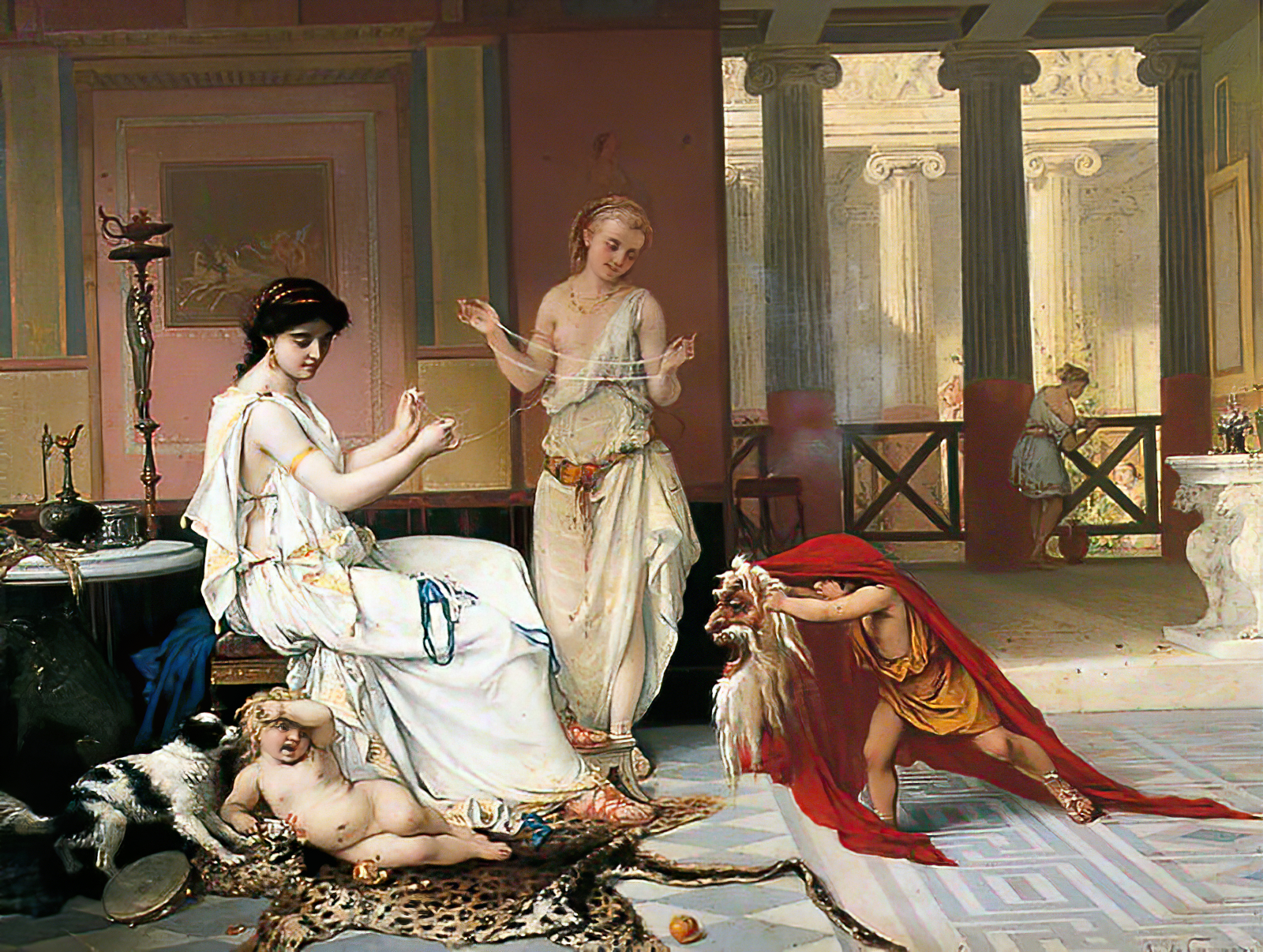
The mask

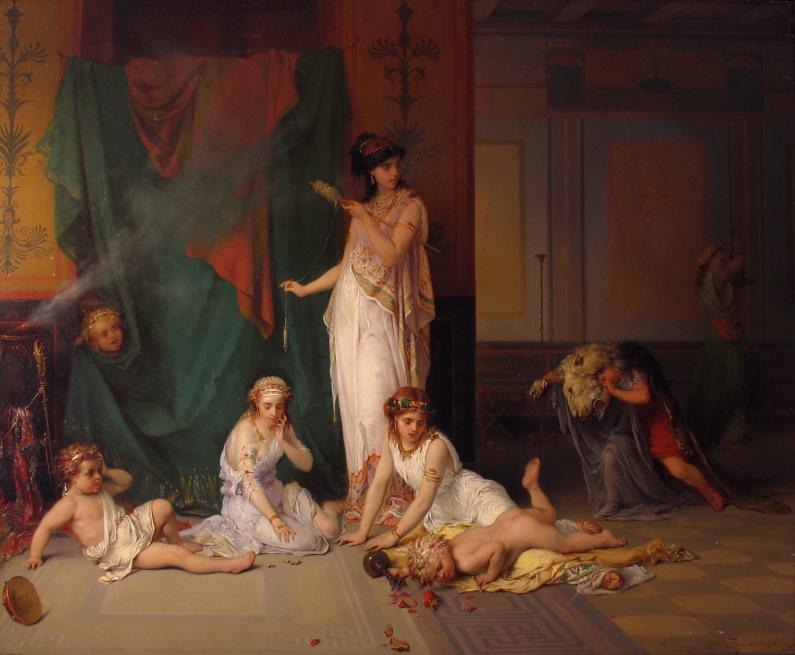
The panic

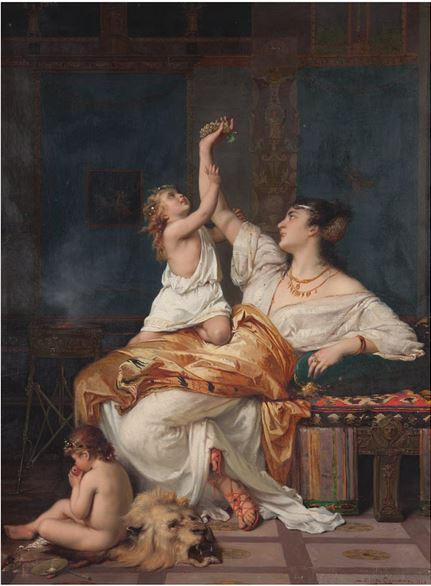
The reward

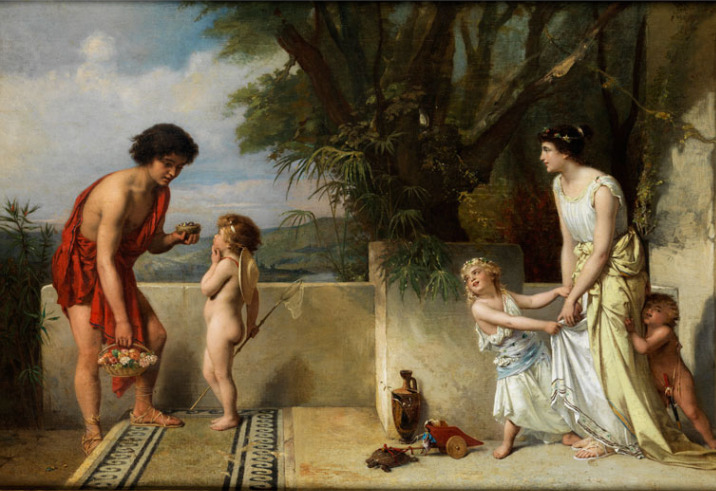
The visit

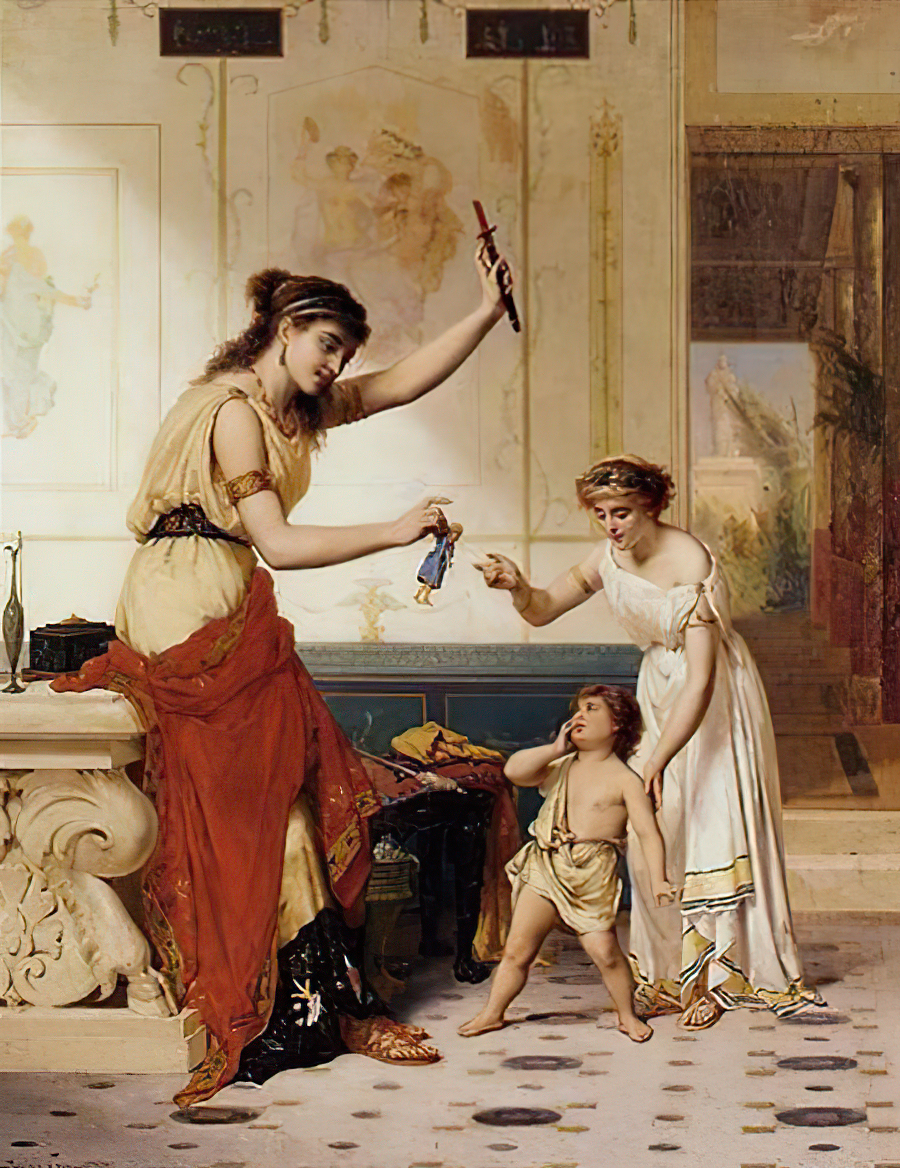
A Difficult Choice

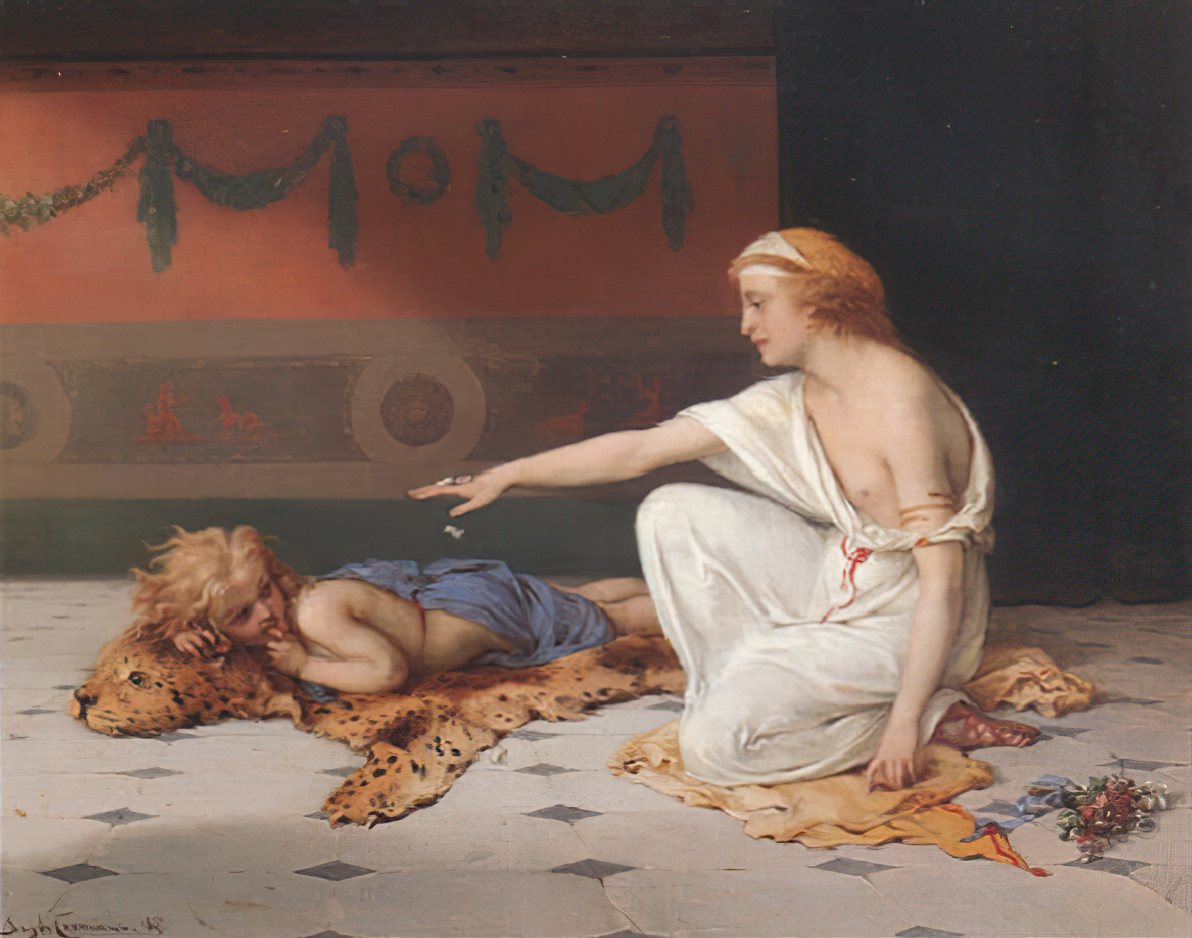
An Afternoon's Amusement

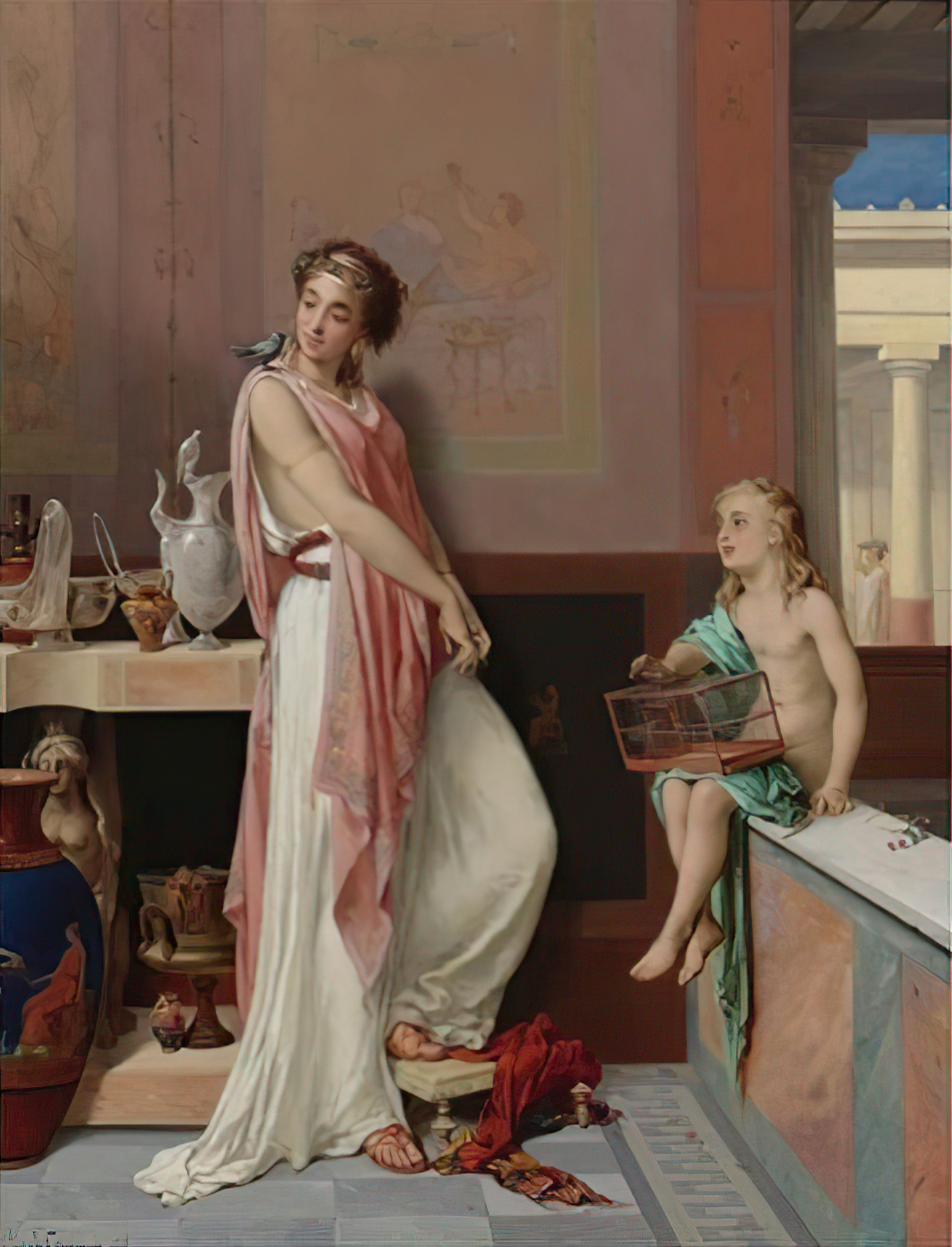
The Favorite Pet or Feathered Friend

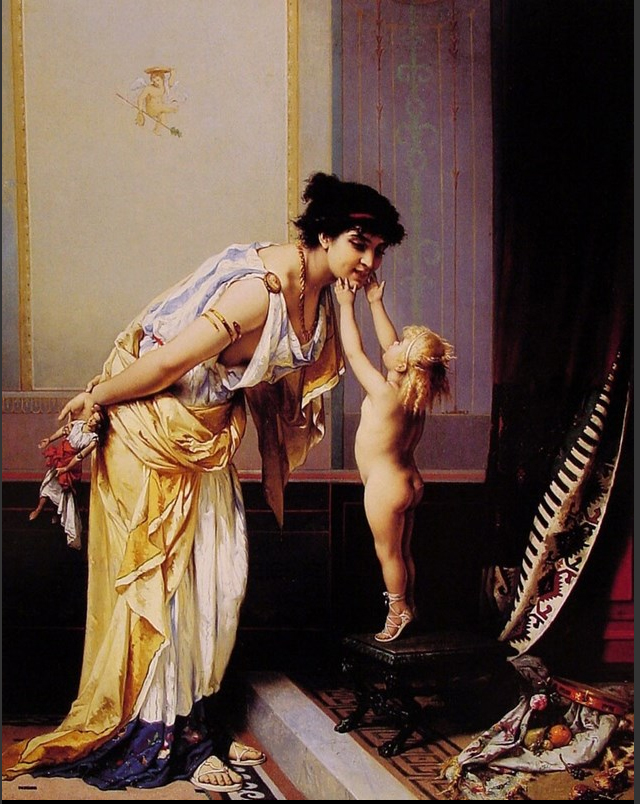
A Warm Exchange, 1875

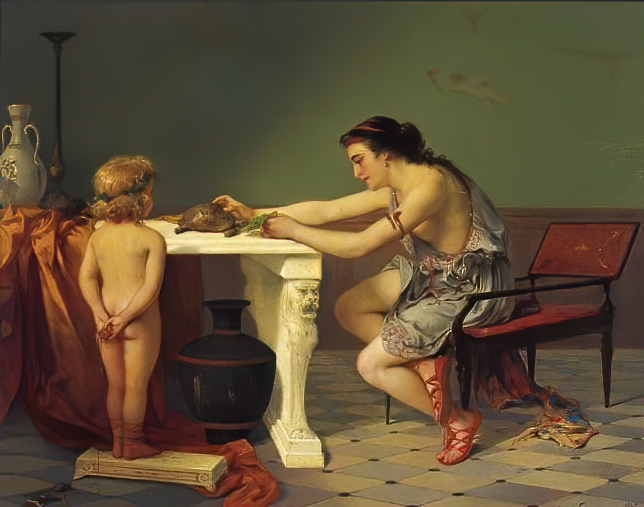
Feeding The Turtle

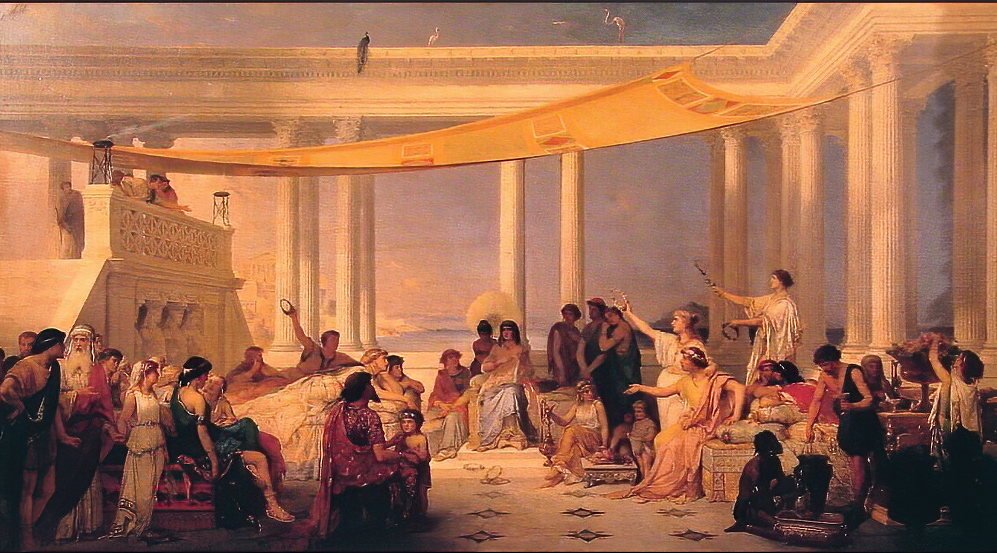
Sappho at Mitylene, 1876
