= Apollonius =

Apollonius (Ancient Greek: Ἀπολλώνιος) is a masculine given name which may refer to:

== People ==
=== Ancient world ===
==== Artists ====
- Apollonius of Athens (sculptor) (fl. 1st century BC)
- Apollonius of Tralles (fl. 2nd century BC), sculptor
- Apollonius (satyr sculptor)
- Apollonius (son of Archias), sculptor

==== Historians ====
- Apollonius of Aphrodisias (fl. c. 3rd century BC), historian of Caria
- Apollonius of Ascalon, historian mentioned by Stephanus of Byzantium

==== Writers ====
- Apollonius Attaleus, writer on dreams
- Apollonius of Acharnae, ancient Greek writer on festivals
- Apollonius of Laodicea, writer on astrology
- Apollonius of Rhodes (born c. 270 BC), librarian and poet, best known for the Argonautica
- Apollonius (son of Chaeris), ancient Greek writer, mentioned by the scholiast on Aristophanes
- Apollonius (son of Sotades), writer

==== Oratory ====
- Apollonius Dyscolus (fl. 2nd century AD), grammarian
- Apollonius Eidographus, ancient Greek grammarian
- Apollonius Molon (fl. 70 BC), rhetorician
- Apollonius of Athens or Apollonius of Naucratis, (fl. 2nd century AD), sophist and rhetorician
- Apollonius the Effeminate (fl. 120 BC), Greek rhetorician of Alabanda in Caria
- Apollonius the Sophist, grammarian who lived towards the end of the 1st century, and wrote a renowned Homeric lexicon

==== Philosophers ====
- Apollonius Cronus (fl. 4th century BC), philosopher of the Megarian school
- Apollonius of Chalcedon, philosophy tutor to the emperors Marcus Aurelius and Lucius Verus
- Apollonius of Syria, Platonic philosopher
- Apollonius of Tyana (c. 40–c. 100 AD), Neo-Pythagorean philosopher
- Apollonius of Tyre (philosopher), Stoic philosopher
- Apollonius paradoxographus (fl. 2nd century BC), paradoxographer

==== Political ====
- Apollonius (ambassador) (fl. 2nd century BC), ambassador sent from the Seleucid Empire
- Apollonius (consul 460), consul in 460
- Apollonius (freedman), or Publius Licinius Apollonius, secretary of Publius Licinius Crassus
- Apollonius (magister militum) (fl. 443–451), Eastern Roman general
- Apollonius of Clazomenae (fl. 2nd century BC), ambassador sent to the Seleucid Empire
- Apollonius of Drepanum (fl. 2nd century BC), citizen of Sicily
- Apollonius of Sicily, leader of a revolt in 103 BCE
- Apollonius (praetorian prefect) (442–443), Roman Praetorian prefect
- Apollonius (Seleucid) (fl. 2nd century BC) a friend of Demetrius I Soter
- Apollonius (son of Charinus), politician under Alexander the Great
- Apollonius the dioiketes (fl. 250 BC), finance minister of Egypt
- Apollonius (tyrant), (fl. 1st century BC), Mesopotamian tyrant
- Apollonius, general of the Samarians, who was defeated at the Battle of Ma'aleh Levona in 167 BC

==== Religious figures ====
- Apollonius, Bishop of Corinth, 2nd-century Bishop of Corinth
- Apollonius (bishop of Ephesus), 2nd-century Christian writer
- Apollonius (martyr), Christian martyr of the 2nd century
- Apollonius of Egypt, theorist on the age of the world
- Apollonius of Ephesus (fl. 180–210), religious leader and writer
- Apollonius the Apologist (died c. 186), religious leader
- Apollonius of Rome, Christian martyr of the 4th century

==== Physicians and scientists ====
- List of physicians named Apollonius, a list of physicians in ancient Greece and Rome
  - Apollonius Glaucus, physician
  - Apollonius of Citium (fl. 1st century BC), physician
- Apollonius of Perga (late 3rd–early 2nd centuries BC), geometer and astronomer

==== Other ====
- Apollonius of Myndus, ancient astrologer said to be skilled with horoscopes

=== Modern world ===
- Apollonius Schotte (c. 1579–1639), Dutch statesman
- Apollonius von Maltitz (1795–1870), Russian diplomat
- Apoloniusz Bębnista, Polish teacher, Barbarka massacre victim
- Apoloniusz Kędzierski (1861–1939), Polish painter, illustrator and decorator
- Apoloniusz Nieniewski, Polish architect of Mier Halls
- Apoloniusz Tajner (born 1954), Polish Nordic combined skier and former coach of the Polish national ski jumping team
- Apoloniusz Tyszka, Polish scientist

== Fictional characters ==
- Apollonius of Tyre, medieval fictional character

== See also ==
- Apollinaris (disambiguation)
- Apollo (disambiguation)
- Apollodorus (disambiguation)
- Apollonia (disambiguation)
- Apollonius point, a triangle center in plane geometry
- Apollonius' theorem, an elementary geometry theorem about triangles
- Circles of Apollonius
- Problem of Apollonius, geometric problem touching on tangency of circle
- Parnassius apollonius, scientific name of a butterfly
