= Alabanda (surname) =

Alabanda is a surname. Notable people with the surname include:

- Apollonius of Alabanda, Greek rhetorician with epithet Malakos
- Apollonius of Alabanda, Greek rhetorician with epithet Molon
- The Alabanda noble family of Poland
- Sebastián Alabanda (born 1950), Spanish footballer
