= Josephine Lang =

German composer (1815–1880)

Josephine Caroline Lang
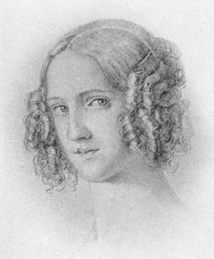
- Born: March 14, 1815; Munich, Kingdom of Bavaria
- Died: December 2, 1880 (aged 65); Tübingen, Kingdom of Württemberg, German Empire
- Era: Romantic

Josephine Caroline Lang (14 March 1815 – 2 December 1880) was a German composer. Josephine Lang was the daughter of Theobald Lang, a violinist, and Regina Hitzelberger, opera singer. Her mother taught young Josephine how to play piano, and from age five it became apparent that Josephine was possessed with great potential as a composer. As early as age eleven Josephine started giving piano lessons herself. Through her godfather, Joseph Stieler, Josephine was exposed to some of the greatest artists of her time. Both Felix Mendelssohn and Ferdinand Hiller went to great lengths to ensure that Lang learned the proper theory for song-writing, and used their connections to publish Lang's music. Even Robert Schumann published a song of Josephine's in Neue Zeitschrift für Musik in 1838.

== Biography ==
Born in Munich, Lang had from a very young age been described as having a "weak constitution". Thus she was always struggling to keep up her education and performance while simultaneously maintaining her health. Once during a performance for the king and queen of Bavaria, Queen Caroline Augusta of Bavaria took notice of Josephine's poor state of health and arranged for her to go to Wildbad Kreuth in the German Alps to recover. During her stay there, she met Christian Reinhold Köstlin, a lawyer who also took to writing poetry on the side. According to all sources, the two fell in love and shared a happy marriage. Köstlin was a professor at the University of Tübingen.

Köstlin died in 1856 of what is now suspected to be cancer. To sustain her family, Lang went back to song writing and piano pedagogy. After some financial floundering and unsuccessful attempts at publishing music, she contacted Ferdinand Hiller and Clara Schumann for aid and assistance. Upon hearing the news, Clara organised a benefit concert with herself as the pianist, featuring Lang's music. Hiller wrote a biographical essay about Lang in 1867 to send to publishers. Soon thereafter, primarily due to Hiller's essay, Lang become a prominent composer successful enough to have her work published.

Her last years were filled with trauma and illness. Lang lived to see her three sons die for various reasons, and after her two daughters married in 1868 and 1870, Josephine was left feeling alone and abandoned. She herself suffered during this time period, though she still composed music and taught piano through this entire time. On 2 December 1880, Lang died in Tübingen of a heart attack; she left an important legacy in her music.

== Selected list of published works ==
=== Songs ===
- 8 German Lieder Lieder, opus 1 (Munich, 1831), texts by Goethe, Schiller, King Ludwig I of Bavaria, Gottfried Wilhelm Fink, Ludwig Hölty, Theodor Körner
- 6 German Lieder, opus 2, (Munich, 1831), texts by Hölty, Karoline Pichler and others
- 4 German Lieder, opus 3, (Munich, 1834), texts by August Graf von Platen, Leopold Feldmann, Friedrich von Matthisson and Gottwalt (Johann Georg Seegemund)
- 4 German Lieder, opus 4 (Munich/Bern, probably before 1838), texts by Johann Georg Jacobi and others
- 4 German Lieder, opus 5, (Munich, 1834), texts by Goethe, Jacobi and Matthisson
- 4 German Lieder, opus 6 (Munich, probably before 1838), texts by Wilhelm Müller, Goethe, Gottwalt and Matthisson
- 6 Songs, opus 7 (Munich, 1838), texts by Jacobi, Friedrich Förster, Ludwig Uhland, Justinus Kerner and King Ludwig I
- 3 Lieder, opus 8 (Vienna, 1838)
- 6 Lieder, opus 9 (Leipzig, 1841), texts by Goethe, Nikolaus Lenau, Christian Reinhard Köstlin, Johann Aloys Blumauer and Jacobi
- 6 Lieder, opus 10 (Leipzig, 1841), texts by Köstlin, Goethe, Christoph August Tiedge, Lenau and Ernst Schulze
- 6 German Lieder, opus 11 (Leipzig, 1845), texts by Uhland and Kerner
- 6 Lieder, opus 12 (Leipzig, 1845), texts by Köstlin
- 6 Lieder, opus 13 (Mainz/Antwerp/Brussels, 1847), texts by Köstlin, Heinrich Wenzel, Heine, Lenau and Apollonius von Maltitz
- 6 German Lieder, opus 14 (Leipzig, 1848), texts by Köstlin
- 6 German Lieder, opus 15 (Leipzig, 1848), texts by Johann Ludwig Deinhardstein, Heine, Byron and Feldmann
- Am Bache, opus 20 (1850) Text by Köstlin 1852 und 1859
- Auf der Reise, opus 22 (Stuttgart, 1855), text by Ludwig Bechstein
- 3 Lieder, opus 23 (Stuttgart, 1859), texts by Köstlin, Ida, Countess von Hahn-Hahn and Josephine Stieler
- 6 Lieder, opus 25 (Leipzig, 1860), texts by Uhland, von Platen, Köstlin, Rückert and others
- 6 Lieder, opus 26 (Leipzig, 1860), dedicated to Clara Schumann, texts by Hoffmann von Fallersleben, Köstlin, von Platen, Lenau and Friedrich Mayer
- 6 German Lieder, opus 27 (Stuttgart, 1872), texts by Köstlin
- 2 Lieder, opus 28 (Vienna, 1861), texts by Heine and Josephine Stieler
- Songs of Sorrow, opus 29 (Bonn, 1862)
- Zwei Lieder, opus 30 (Stuttgart, 1864), texts by Ottilie Wildermuth
- Disteln und Dornen, opus 33 [34] (Hamburg, 1864/69), texts by Goethe, Heine and others
- 2 Lieder, opus 34 [35] (Stuttgart, 1864)
- 3 Lieder, opus 34 [36] (Berlin, 1872)
- 3 Lieder, opus 36 [38] (Leipzig/Winterthur, 1866 or 1867)
- 6 Lieder, opus 38 [39] (Leipzig/Winterthur, 1867) texts by Robert Prutz, Niklas Müller, Heine, Fink and Köstlin
- 6 German Lieder, opus 40 (Stuttgart, 1867), texts by Goethe, Heine, von Platen and others
- Ich möchte heim!, opus 41 (Leipzig/Winterthur, 1866) text by Carl Gerok
- 5 Songs, opus 43 (Stuttgart, 1879), texts by Matthias Claudius, Uhland, Gerok, Köstlin and Zeller
- 5 Lieder from the Trumpeter of Säckingen (Weimar, 1879),
- 40 Lieder (Leipzig, 1882), texts by Byron, Max von Schenkendorf, Christian Fürchtegott Gellert, Luise Henriette von Oranien, Paul Gerhardt, amongst others, and from Des Knaben Wunderhorn
- Selected songs on texts by Heine, Goethe, Lenau and others (published by Furore Verlag, 2009)
- Selected songs after texts by Reinhold Köstlin (published by Strube Verlag, 2008)

=== Choral works ===
In "Selected songs after texts by Reinhold Köstlin", 2008:

- „Flieg’ auf o deutscher Adler“ for male voice choir, text by Köstlin
- Hochzeitlied for women's choir, text by Köstlin

=== Piano music ===
- Apollo March, published in Allgemeine Illustrirte Zeitung, 1859
- Elegie on the Death of Ludwig Uhland, opus 31 (Stuttgart, 1863)
- Festmarsch, opus 31(32) (Stuttgart, 1866)
- Two Character Pieces, opus 32 (Stuttgart, 1864)
- Songs without Words, opus 35 (1860/1861)
- Wedding March, opus 42 (Stuttgart, 1878)
- Gruß in die Ferne, opus 44 (Stuttgart, 1879)
- Danse infernale, opus 46 (Weimar, 1879)
- German Victory March, opus 48 (Leipzig, 1888)
- Two Mazurkas, opus 49 (Leipzig, 1888)
- In the Twilight, Impromptu opus 50 (Leipzig, 1888)
- Three Piano Pieces (Arabesque, The Mournful Humour and Homesickness) (Frankfurt, 1890 or earlier)

(All dates are of publication, not composition)

== Discography ==
- Josephine Lang. Dana Mckay, soprano; Thérèse Lindquist, piano. SBPK Deutsche Schallplatten DS 1016-2 (1995).
- Josephine Lang, Johanna Kinkel; Ausgewählte Lieder. Claudia Taha, soprano; Heidi Kommerell, piano. Bayer Records BR 100 248 (1995).
- Münchner Komponistinnen der Klassik und Romantik. Christel Krömer, soprano; Jutta Vornehm, piano. Musica Bavarica MB 902. Reissued on CD as MB 75121 (1997).
- Alphabetic listing of musical settings:

== Bibliography ==
- Citron, Marcia J. “Lang, Josephine.” Oxford University Press, 2007, Grove Music Online (Accessed 15 February 2007), http://www.grovemusic.com
- Citron, Marcia. "Women and the Lied, 1775–1850." Women Making Music, ed. Jane Bowers and Judith Tick. Chicago: University of Illinois Press, 1986
- Krebs, Harald (2003). "Josephine Lang". In Schleifer, Martha Furman; Glickman, Sylvia (eds.). Women Composers: Music Through The Ages. Vol. 7: Composers Born 1800-1899: Vocal Music. New York: G. K. Hall. ISBN 978-0-7838-8194-2.
- Krebs, Harald. "Josephine Lang and the Salon in Southern Germany", Musical Salon Culture in the Long Nineteenth Century, ed. Ed. by Anja Bunzel / Natasha Loges, Woodbridge 2019, p. 199–210.
- Biography and appreciation including a completed workslist by: "Musik und Gender im Internet" (MUGI): (in German)
