= Asianism =

Asianism may refer to

- Asiatic style, an Ancient Greek rhetorical tendency
- Pan-Asianism, an ideology aimed at creating political and economic unity among Asian peoples
