= Schotte =

Schotte is a surname. Notable people with the surname include:

- Apollonius Schotte (c. 1579–1639), Dutch statesman, jurist and poet
- Briek Schotte (1919–2004), Belgian professional cyclist
- Gerrit Schotte (born 1974), politician from Curaçao
- Jacques Schotte (1928–2007), Belgian psychiatrist and psychoanalyst
- Jan Pieter Schotte (1928–2005), Belgian Cardinal
