= Thomas Burnet (judge) =

English wit, barrister and judge

Thomas Burnet (1694–1753) was an English wit, barrister and judge, from a Scottish-Dutch background.

== Early life ==
He was the grandson of the Scottish judge Robert Burnet, Lord Crimond; and third and youngest son of Gilbert Burnet by his second wife, Mrs. Mary Scott, a rich Dutch lady of Scottish extraction. His mother died in 1698: two years later his father remarried her best friend Elizabeth Berkeley, who proved to be a kindly stepmother to Thomas and his siblings. He was educated at home, entered Merton College, Oxford, and in 1706 went to the University of Leyden, where he remained for two years. Afterwards, he travelled in Germany, Switzerland, and Italy, and on his return entered at Middle Temple in 1709.

As a young man, Burnet's attention was on Whig politics; he was notorious about London for debauchery and wit. Jonathan Swift, writing of the Mohocks in 1712, said: "The bishop of Salisbury's son is said to be of the gang; they are all whigs". His reputation for debauchery caused his father much distress, although there was no permanent estrangement, and Thomas was sincerely grieved by the death of Gilbert, whom he called "the best of fathers", in 1715.

In 1716, he went as the King's Secretary to the Diet of Regensburg. He published many pamphlets, for one of which, Certain information of a certain discourse, the Whigs, on their accession to power, rewarded him with the consulship at Lisbon, a post he held from 1719 to 1728 There he quarrelled with Charles O'Hara, 1st Baron Tyrawley, the English ambassador, and took revenge by appearing on a great occasion in a plain suit himself, but with lacqueys in suits copied from that which the ambassador was to wear.

== Judge ==
Burnet returned to England in 1728 and was called to the bar in 1729. He prevailed upon Attorney General Philip Yorke for employment, and was successful in securing a position as Serjeant-at-Law in Easter term 1736, and King's Serjeant in May 1740. He was appointed a judge of the Court of Common Pleas in October 1741, when William Fortescue became Master of the Rolls. He was knighted in November 1745 and was a Fellow of the Royal Society.

Burnet died unmarried, at his house in Lincoln's Inn Fields, on 8 January 1753, of gout in the stomach, and was buried near his father at St. James's Church, Clerkenwell. Some scandal was created by a clause in his will that he "lived as he trusted he should die, in the true faith of Christ as taught in the scriptures, but not in any one visible church that I know of, though I think the Church of England is as little stuffed with the inventions of men as any of them".

== Works ==
His writings were numerous. To his father's History of my own Time he prefixed a life and copy of his will. He is said to have submitted his father's manuscript to Sarah Churchill, Duchess of Marlborough, who made some alterations, and to have curtailed it himself. The bishop's will had directed that no passages should be omitted, and in the second volume Burnet had promised to deposit the manuscript of both volumes, written by the bishop's amanuensis and corrected throughout by himself, in the Cotton Library; but failed to fulfil his promise.

Other works are:

- Our Ancestors as Wise as we, by T. B., 1712, and a sequel, The History of Ingratitude;
- Essays Divine, Moral, and Political, by the Author of “The Tale of a Tub,” 1714;
- The True Character of an Honest Man;
- Truth if you can find it;
- A Letter to the People, to be left for them at the Booksellers;
- Some New Proofs by which it appears that the Pretender is truly James III, 1713 and 1714;
- A Second Tale of a Tub, 1715;
- British Bulwark, 1715;
- The Necessity of impeaching the late Ministry, a Letter to Earl of Halifax, three editions, 1715;
- Homerides, by Sir Iliad Doggerel (an attack on Alexander Pope in collaboration with George Ducket);
- The True Church of Christ, 1753;

and a volume of posthumous poems, 1777. He also wrote in The Grumbler and replied to George Granville's vindication of General George Monck against Gilbert Burnet's strictures.

== Bibliography ==
- "Burnet, Thomas (1694-1753)" . Dictionary of National Biography. London: Smith, Elder & Co. 1885–1900.
- McLeod, Anne Byrne (2011). The Mid-Eighteenth Century Navy from the Perspective of Captain Thomas Burnett and His Peers (Ph.D.). Exeter University. OCLC 757128667.

Attribution

This article incorporates text from a publication now in the public domain: "Burnet, Thomas (1694-1753)". Dictionary of National Biography. London: Smith, Elder & Co. 1885–1900.
