= Androetas =

Geographer of ancient Greece

Androetas (Ancient Greek: Ἀνδροίτας) of Tenedos was a geographer of ancient Greece of uncertain date. He was the author of a work The Circumnavigation of Marmara (Περίπλους τῆς Προποντίδος), which was referenced by the scholiast on Apollonius of Rhodes. This work is now lost, and nothing more is known of him.
