= Zenodotion =

Zenodotion (Ancient Greek: Ζηνοδότιον), or Zenodotium or Zenodotia, was a city in Mesopotamia that was destroyed in the 1st century BCE.

Zenodotion was a polis of Osroene near Nicephorium (modern Raqqa, in Syria), though we do not know its exact location. It may have been a native Mesopotamian town, a Greek colony, or a colony founded on or adjacent to a native town. The writer Plutarch mentions this city, saying the Greeks called it Zenodotion, implying that its inhabitants might have called it something else. The historian Cassius Dio thought it was a Greek and Macedonian colony.

The classical scholar William Woodthorpe Tarn suggested that, like the Phrygian city of Docimium, Zenodotion was a city named after the military officer who first settled it. It is possible that the city was founded by a man in the army of Alexander the Great or Antigonus I Monophthalmus, or a member of the Seleucid Empire, but there is no compelling evidence to show the way here.

== Destruction ==
Plutarch tells the story of the invasion of Marcus Licinius Crassus into the region, and how Zenodotion, ruled by Apollonius, was the only city that offered significant resistance. It symbolically surrendered to the overwhelming Roman army, and as was common, requested a garrison, and was granted one: a Roman century, approximately 100 men. One night the people of Zenodotion took the century by surprise and executed all of its members.

For this, Crassus sacked and destroyed the city, and sold its inhabitants into slavery. He later hailed himself as Imperator for this feat, which attracted the scorn of his contemporaries, as this was not considered that impressive a victory at all.
