= Aeschines of Miletus =

1st-century BC orator

Aeschines of Miletus (Gr. Αἰσχίνης ὁ Μιλήσιος) was a contemporary of Cicero, and a distinguished orator in the Asiatic style of eloquence, which, according to Cicero, "rushes with an impetuous stream. But it is not merely fluent; its language is ornate and polished."

Aeschines is said by Diogenes Laërtius to have written on politics. He died in exile on account of having spoken too freely to Pompey.
