= Atticism =

Rhetorical movement originating from 1st century BC Greece

Atticism (meaning "favouring Attica", the region of Athens in Greece) was a rhetorical movement that began in the first quarter of the 1st century BC. It may also refer to the wordings and phrasings typical of this movement, in contrast with various contemporary forms of Koine Greek (both literary and vulgar), which continued to evolve in directions guided by the common usages of Hellenistic Greek.

Atticism was portrayed as a return to Classical methods after what was perceived as the pretentious style of the Sophist rhetoric and called for a return to the approaches of the Attic orators.

Although the plainer language of Atticism eventually became as belabored and ornate as the perorations it sought to replace, its original simplicity meant that it remained universally comprehensible throughout the Greek world. This helped maintain vital cultural links across the Mediterranean and beyond. Admired and popularly imitated writers such as Lucian also adopted Atticism, so that the style survived until the Renaissance, when it was taken up by non-Greek students of Byzantine immigrants. Renaissance scholarship, the basis of modern scholarship in the West, nurtured strong Classical and Attic views, continuing Atticism for another four centuries.

Represented at its height by rhetoricians such as Dionysius of Halicarnassus, and grammarians such as Herodian and Phrynichus Arabius at Alexandria, this tendency prevailed from the 1st century BC onward, and with the force of an ecclesiastical dogma controlled all subsequent Greek culture, so that the living form of the Greek language was quite obscured and only occasionally found expression, chiefly in private documents, though also in popular literature.

However, there were writers such as Strabo, Plutarch and Josephus who intentionally withdrew from this way of expression in favor of the common form of Greek.

== See also ==
- Asiatic style
- Laconism
