= John Kennedy, 6th Earl of Cassilis =

Scottish peer

John Kennedy, 6th Earl of Cassillis, PC (died April 1668) was a Scottish peer, the grandson of Gilbert Kennedy, 4th Earl of Cassillis, and nephew of John Kennedy, 5th Earl of Cassillis. He succeeded to the titles of 8th Lord Kennedy and 6th Earl of Cassillis on 25 July 1616. He was a non-sitting member of Cromwell's House of Lords, and was invested as a Privy Counsellor of Scotland on 13 February 1660/61. He held the office of Justice-general from 1649 to 1651 and of an Extraordinary Lord of Session for Scotland from June 1661 to July 1662.

== Support of the Covenanters ==
Kennedy was devoted to the Presbyterian cause in Scotland against the efforts of King Charles I to impose an Anglican form of church polity on the northern kingdom in 1638. In 1639, strongly sympathetic to Covenant theology, Cassillis was among the 20,000 Covenanters who met the king's army at Duns Law, a show of force which resulted in royal permission to summon a free General Assembly and to seat a free Parliament to ratify the Assembly's acts.

In 1643, Cassillis represented Scotland's Solemn League and Covenant at the Westminster Assembly, a convention of English divines and Members of Parliament of Calvinist persuasion who desired to reduce episcopal influence in the Church of England and reorganize with elders, or presbyters, in the manner of the Scottish Church. After the defeat of the Covenanters at the Battle of Kilsyth in 1645, Cassillis fled to Ireland, but in the next year was one of the Scottish commissioners who met with King Charles to gain his assent to the decisions of the English (Puritan) Parliament. However, in 1648, he opposed the Engagers, a Covenanter faction desirous of treating with Charles I.

After the Engagers were defeated by the Cromwellians at the Battle of Prestonpans, Cassillis joined with John Campbell, 1st Earl of Loudoun, and Alexander Montgomerie, 6th Earl of Eglinton, as leaders of the Whiggamore Raid on Edinburgh, undertaken to oust the Engager-dominated Committee of Estates and strengthen the hand of the Kirk party.

After the execution of Charles I in London, in January 1649, Cassillis was among the seven commissioners who met with Charles II (whom the Scots, unlike the English, continued to recognize) in The Hague the following March. They hoped to persuade the young king to accept both the Scottish National Covenant of 1638 and the Solemn League and Covenant of 1643. They further insisted that he enjoin acts of the Scottish Parliament on England and Ireland.

On 19 May Charles replied that he would accept the Scottish acts relating to the National Covenant and Presbyterian doctrine and would adopt anything in the Solemn League and Covenant that benefitted Scotland without injuring England or Ireland; however, he would not overthrow the recent peace agreement between England and Ireland. The commission regarded this response as a rejection of their demands and returned to Scotland, landing at Leith on 27 May.

In February 1650, Cassillis was in attendance at a meeting of the Committee of Estates, whose members were divided into two strongly opposed groups. One group wanted to send commissioners to treat with Charles at Breda in the Netherlands, his headquarters in exile. This group included Argyll, Loudoun, and all the lords present except Cassillis. But rumours were about that Charles was consolidating an alliance with Irish Catholics, which drove the other faction on the Committee of Estates to double down on the demand that Charles acknowledge the legality of the sitting Scottish Parliament.

Argyll's group at first prevailed, but in the debate regarding the instructions to be given to the commissioners, Cassillis' opinion prevailed and the group was commissioned "to require of Charles the same absolute surrender which had been required of him at The Hague". To provide balance, representatives of both camps were included in the commission, with Cassillis representing the firmer position on behalf of the Covenant. Cassillis also served as one of the commissioners of the Kirk who were joining in their secular counterparts on the embassy to Breda.

On 25 March the commissioners met with Charles in the Netherlands and put forward the following demands:

- He was to consent to the establishment of the Presbyterian system in England and Ireland.
- He was to practice Presbyterianism personally and enforce its practice amongst the members of his household.
- He was to acknowledge the legality of the recent sessions of the Scottish Parliament.
- He was to agree that all secular matters in Scotland would be decided by the Parliament; and ecclesiastical matters, by the general assemblies of the Kirk.
- He was to suspend toleration of Catholicism and cancel all declarations that were deemed prejudicial to the Covenant.

Anticipating Charles' response, William II, Prince of Orange, offered to negotiate a compromise, but the commissioners, who had been cautioned upon their departure from Scotland not to negotiate anything beyond what their commission stated, would not relent. Aware that Charles was having difficulty solidifying support in England, Cassillis and two other commissioners, acting through the Prince of Orange, sought to put his mind at rest:

If in any particular our answers be not fully satisfactory to his Majesty's desires, we humbly conceive it more expedient that his Majesty, putting himself on the affections of his [Scottish] people, should refer them to his [Scottish] Parliament where his Royal presence will obtain more than we are warranted to grant,

Charles, despite a few more attempts at negotiation, assented to this proposal, though historian Samuel Rawson Gardiner has noted that behind the scenes "the Duke of Lorraine, the Queen of Sweden, and the Prince of Orange . . . combined in urging him to promise anything with the direct intention of breaking his word whenever he was strong enough to do it with impunity".

Perhaps in this hope, the king raised his hackles once more and indicated that his willingness to execute penal laws against the Catholics notwithstanding, he would not consent to annual reconstructions to the treaties with the Irish and would protect the Second Peace Treaty (1649) which had exempted Irish Catholics from the penal laws. Still, lacking anything more than moral support from his allies, Charles could only capitulate and, accordingly, on 28 April sent a private note to Cassillis promising "to insert the required form of words after his landing in Scotland if the Parliament should require him so to do", which Gardiner views as proof that the king was marvellously naïve in his understanding of the resolve of the Scottish lawmakers.

On 1 May Charles signed a draft of his agreement with the commissioners, which is known in history as the Treaty of Breda. Satisfied, the commission invited Charles to Scotland on 29 May.

== After the Restoration ==
In 1660, Charles II was restored to the throne of England in the wake of the Puritan collapse following Cromwell's death. The religious issue that had sparked the Civil War was still simmering. In the Parliament of April 1662, all laws passed during the Interregnum were annulled, and the provisions for church polity of 1633 were restored. So great a hegemony was given to the bishops, that even the bishops themselves deemed the provisions excessive. As for Cassilis, "a man of most inflexible firmness", when asked to submit, he chose instead to resign his offices and leave Parliament.

In 1665, when some among the Scots were seeking assistance from Holland against the English, Cassilis was approached for support, but he declined inasmuch as he "had given his word to the king that he would never engage in any plots, and he had got under the King's hand a promise that he and his family should not be disturbed, let him serve God in what way he pleased".

In 1681, Charles initiated a move in Scotland to return the Presbyterians to the original Covenant established by John Knox in the reign of James VI, a document which had been composed before either the Solemn League and Covenant or the National Covenant. It was also deemed necessary to force a Test Act on the Scots similar to that which had already been established in England. The test would be required of any person who desired to hold any office—ecclesiastical, educational, or governmental—in Scotland. Scottish historian George Buchanan summarized the planks of the Test Act by pointing out that those who wished to hold office had to swear the following:

. . . that they owned and sincerely professed the true protestant religion contained in the aforesaid confession of faith; that they believed it to be founded on and agreeable to the written word of God; that they would adhere to it all the days of their lives, educate their children therein, and never consent to any change or alteration contrary thereunto. In this summary, the duty of associating together, of resisting tyranny, and limiting the power of the magistrate is expressly asserted as a sacred obligation; but without adverting to that circumstance, the test oath in the next sentence affirmed that the king’s majesty was the only supreme governor of the realm over all persons and in all causes civil or ecclesiastical; and the lieges swore that they would never consent or determine upon any subject relating to the church or state without his express permission; that they held it unlawful to form associations for redressing grievances or to take up arms against the king; that they would never decline his power and jurisdiction in any case, but would defend the same against all deadly; and this oath was required to be taken in the plain genuine sense of the words, without any equivocation, under the penalty of confiscation.

That the king's legitimate children and brother were to be exempted from the Test Act became a sore point among the Scots, and reaction was so extreme that the Marquess of Argyll and others elected to leave the kingdom rather than submit. Cassilis and other nobles remained in Scotland but made it known they would not sign the oath even if their heritable properties were taken from them.

Tensions continued to mount, and the Covenanters took to the hills, where they would worship in secret meetings, called conventicles, to avoid punishment. However, to demand conformity, the Duke of Lauderdale pushed through the Conventicles Act in 1670 with penalties so severe—not stopping at execution—that even the king stated he would not have passed it had he known all ramifications. The Earl of Cassilis at this time was the only member of Parliament to vote against the act.

In 1675, despite the fact that all Scottish nobles and landed gentry were forbidden to leave Scotland, Cassilis was the first to exit, making for London to complain to the king about Lauderdale's severe measures. Regarding the response of the king, David Hume wrote, "These violent proceedings of Lauderdale were opposite to the natural temper of Charles and he immediately issued orders for discontinuing the bonds and the writs of law-burrows,” yet later was heard to say, "I perceive that Lauderdale has been guilty of many bad things against the people of Scotland; but I cannot find that he has acted anything contrary to my interest".

== "The Gypsy Laddy" and the Countess of Cassilis ==
"The Gypsy Laddy," an old Scottish ballad about Johnny Faa, king of the "Egyptians", or "Gypsies,” became associated with Jean Hamilton, Kennedy's first wife, in the eighteenth century. The ballad narrates the tale of a gypsy band who carried away the lady loved by Johnny Faa. In the eighteenth century, the people of Ayrshire began to associate the tale with Jean Hamilton, adding elements which placed the kidnapping at a time when the Earl was away at Westminster and included the Earl's revenge against the band of "bonny" gypsies. In 1827, Robert Chambers in his Picture of Scotland added the fiction that the Earl imprisoned his wife for the remainder of her life, and that while she still lived, he married another woman. These elements have all been disproved, however. Folklorist Francis James Child explained in the nineteenth century that, first of all, Jean Hamilton had died a year before the Earl went to Westminster; secondly, the Earl's second marriage did not take place until February 1644, more than a year after Lady Hamilton's death; and thirdly, that upon the death of his wife, the Earl wrote a letter of lament to fellow Covenanter the Earl of Eglinton, saying "It hath pleased the Almighty to call my dear bedfellow from this valley of tears to her home (as she herself in her last hour so called it),” and urging Eglinton's attendance at the funeral.

== Family ==
Kennedy's wife, Jean Hamilton (1607–1642), was a daughter of Thomas Hamilton, 1st Earl of Haddington and Margaret Foulis. They married in January 1622. They had three children:

- Lady Catherine Kennedy (d. c Feb. 1700), who married Lord William Cochrane.
- James Kennedy, Lord Kennedy (d. 1642/43)
- Lady Margaret Kennedy (d. 1685), first wife of Bishop Gilbert Burnet

His second wife was Lady Margaret Hay, daughter of William Hay, 10th Earl of Erroll, and Lady Anne Lyon. They married on 15 March 1643/44. They had one child:

- John Kennedy, 7th Earl of Cassilis (Nov. 1653 – 23 July 1701)

Peerage of Scotland
Preceded by John Kennedy	Earl of Cassilis; 1616–1668	Succeeded by John Kennedy
