= Apollonius of Acharnae =

Apollonius of Acharnae (Ancient Greek: Άπολλώνιος) was a heortologist and writer of ancient Greece who lived in the late 2nd century BCE. He was the author of a work on the festivals, On the Festivals (Περὶ ἑορτῶν).

Modern scholars have a dubious opinion of some of the assertions of Apollonius that have been handed down to us -- namely that the Diasia and Meilichios were two separate and distinct festivals.
