= Gilbert Burnet =

Scottish theologian and historian, and Bishop of Salisbury

The Right Reverend Gilbert Burnet
- Bishop of Salisbury
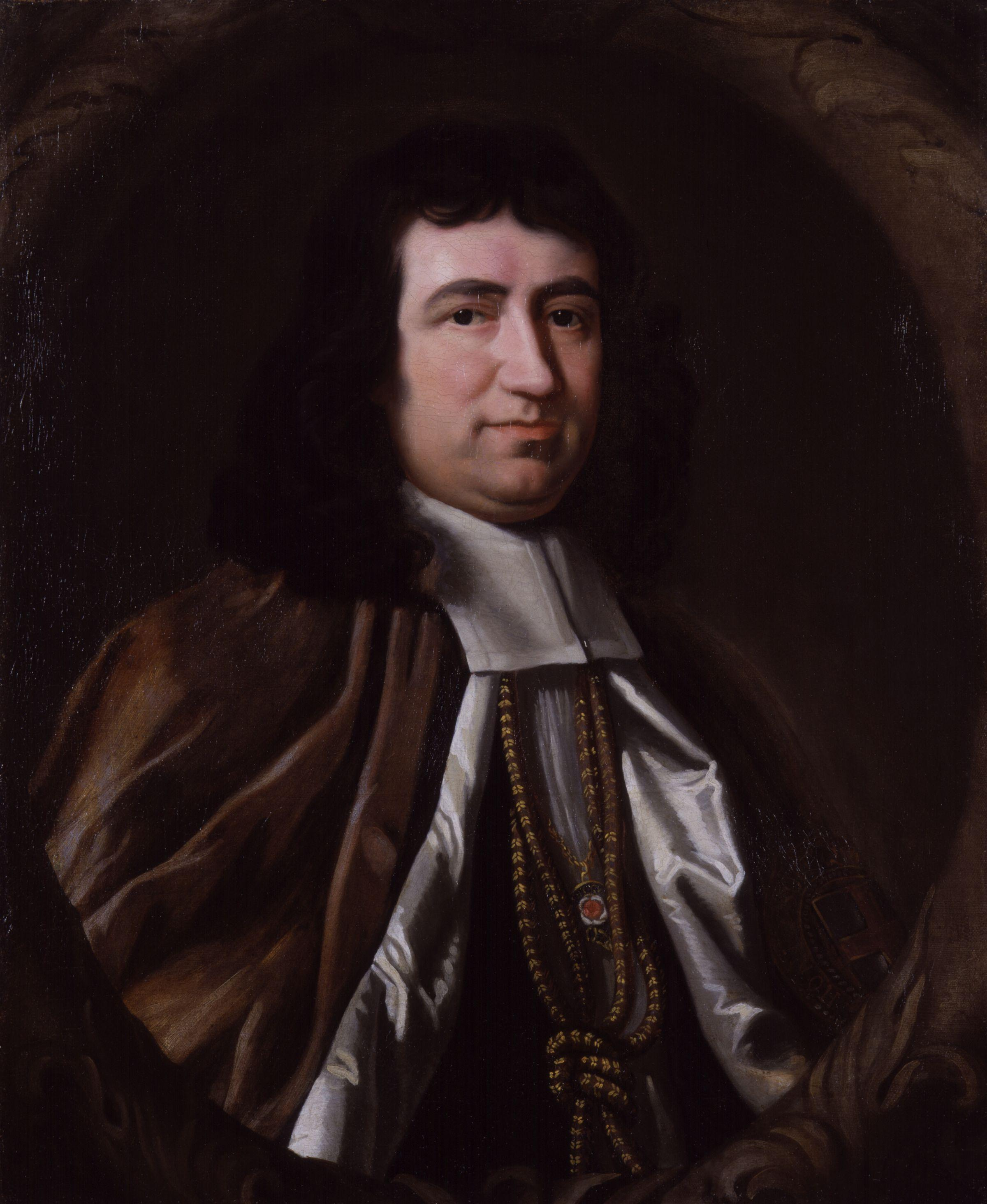
- Church: Scottish Episcopal Church / Church of England
- Predecessor: Seth Ward
- Successor: William Talbot

Orders
- Consecration: 13 March 1689 by Henry Compton

Personal details
- Born: 19 September 1643 Edinburgh, Scotland
- Died: 17 March 1715 (aged 71) St John's Court, Clerkenwell, London, England
- Education: University of Aberdeen

Gilbert Burnet FRS (18 September 1643 – 17 March 1715) was a Scottish philosopher and historian, and Bishop of Salisbury. He was fluent in Dutch, French, Latin, Greek, and Hebrew. Burnet was highly respected as a cleric, a preacher, an academic, a writer and a historian. He was always closely associated with the Whig party, and was one of the few close friends in whom King William III confided.

== Early life: 1643–1674 ==
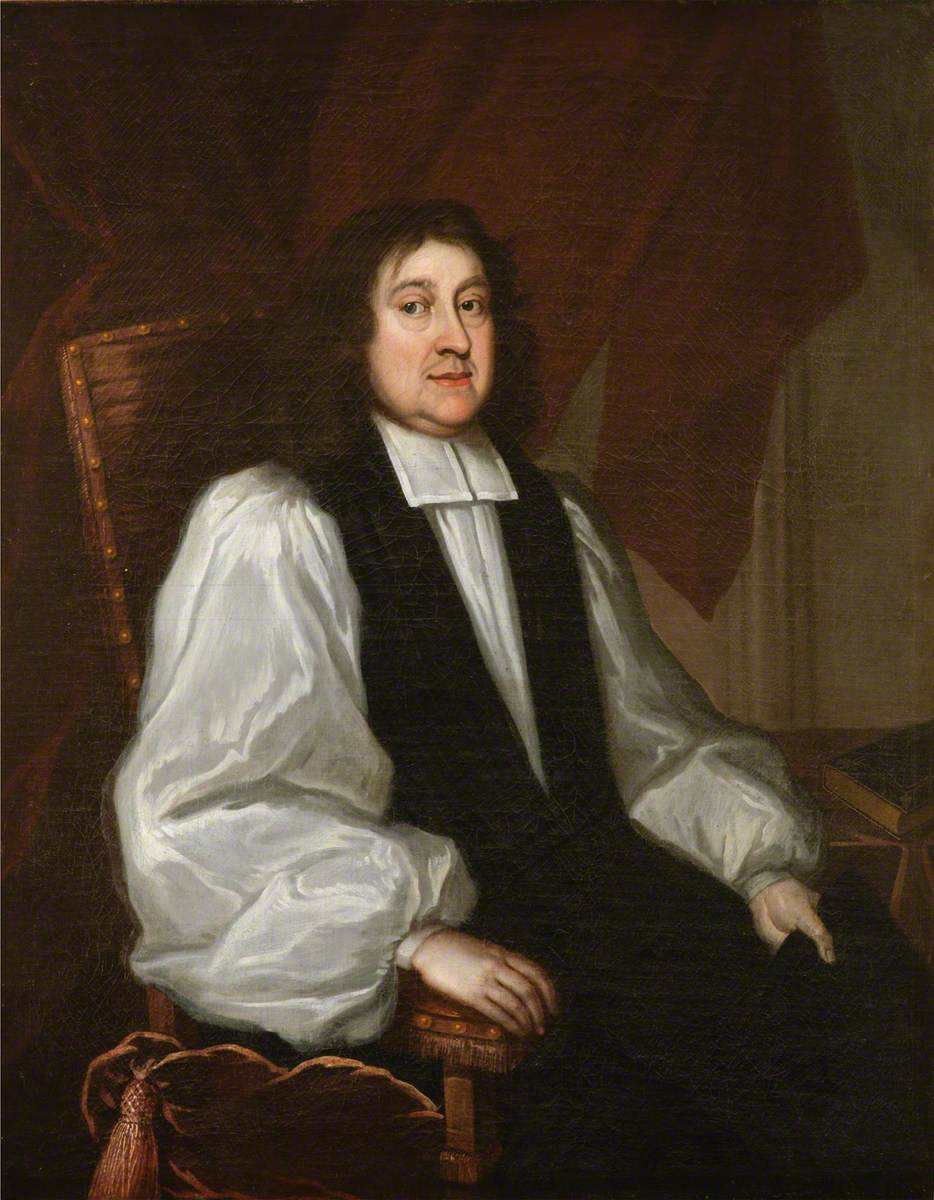
Portrait of Gilbert Burnett, Bishop of Salisbury, painted in the style of Pieter Borsseler.

Burnet was born at Edinburgh, Scotland, in 1643, the son of Robert Burnet, Lord Crimond, a Royalist and Episcopalian lawyer, who became a judge of the Court of Session, and of his second wife Rachel Johnston, daughter of James Johnston, and sister of Archibald Johnston of Warristoun, a leader of the Covenanters. His father was his first tutor until he began his studies at the University of Aberdeen, where he earned a Master of Arts in Philosophy at the age of thirteen. He studied law briefly before changing to theology. He did not enter into the ministry at that time, but travelled for several years. He visited Oxford, Cambridge, London, the United Provinces and France. He studied Hebrew under a Rabbi in Amsterdam. By 1665 he returned to Scotland and was ordained in the Church of Scotland (then episcopal) by the bishop of Edinburgh. In 1664 he was elected a Fellow of the Royal Society.

He began his ministry in the rural church at East Saltoun, East Lothian, and served this community devoutly for four years. In 1669, without his being asked, he was named to the vacant chair of Divinity at the University of Glasgow. At first he declined, since his congregation unanimously asked him to remain at East Saltoun; but, when the Bishop of Edinburgh, Leighton, urged him, he accepted the post. He was later offered, but declined, a Scottish bishopric.

In 1672 or 1673 he privately married Lady Margaret Kennedy, daughter of the Earl of Cassilis, who was many years his senior. The great differences between the couple in age, rank and fortune caused them to keep the marriage secret for a considerable time. Burnet's motives for marriage were certainly not mercenary, as he entered into what has been described as an early form of "pre-nuptial agreement" by which he renounced any claim to his wife's money. Burnet himself recalled that they had been good friends for several years, but that in his view such a close friendship between a single man and a single woman could not continue indefinitely unless they married. The marriage seems to have been happy, despite their lack of children, which Burnet regretted. He was to have numerous children by later marriages.

== London: 1674–1685 ==
In view of the unsettled political times, he left the university in 1674 and moved to London. In London, his political and religious sentiments prompted him to support the Whigs. His energetic and bustling character led him to take an active part in the controversies of the time, and he endeavoured to bring about a reconciliation between Episcopacy and Presbytery.

At Court, where his brother Thomas was a royal physician, he gained the favour of Charles II, from whom he received various preferments. He described Charles shrewdly as a man who, despite his affable manner and famed courtesy, was at heart the archetypal cynic: "he has a very ill opinion of men and women, and so is infinitely distrustful... he thinks the world is governed wholly by (self) interest". Burnet noted fairly that this attitude was quite understandable, given the King's experiences in the English Civil War and the Interregnum, which had shown him when he was still very young the "baseness of human nature". Like many other observers he noted Charles's remarkable self-control: "he has a strange command of himself: he can pass from business to pleasure, and from pleasure to business, in so easy a manner that all things seem alike to him." He also recorded some of the King's most memorable sayings, such as "Appetites are free, and Almighty God will never damn a man for allowing himself a little pleasure".

=== The Popish Plot ===
During the Popish Plot, when Queen Catherine was accused of treason, (it was alleged that she had conspired to murder her husband), the King confided to Burnet his feelings of guilt about his ill-treatment of the Queen, "who is incapable of doing a wicked thing", his resolve not to abandon her ("it would be a horrible thing, considering my faultiness to her"), and his wish to live a more moral life in future. Burnet, for his part, told the King frankly that he was wrong to believe that the Earl of Shaftesbury had any part in the charges of treason made against the Queen: Shaftesbury, who was well aware of the Queen's great popularity with the English ruling class, was simply too shrewd a statesman to make such a serious political misjudgment.

As regards the reality of the Plot itself, while the King quickly became a total sceptic on the subject, Burnet probably captures Charles's first reaction to the accusations neatly enough: "among so many particulars I do not know but there may be some truth." Burnet himself was neither a sceptic, nor a convinced believer in the Plot. Like most sensible Protestants he believed that there had probably been a Catholic conspiracy of some sort, but he had grave doubts about the veracity of the informers, especially Titus Oates, while he regarded Israel Tonge, the co-author of the Plot, as insane. He recognised the danger that innocent people might be falsely accused, and it is notable that he praised the Catholic martyr Oliver Plunkett, Archbishop of Armagh, who is nowadays probably the best-known victim of the Plot, as a good and innocent man who was destroyed by the malice of his personal enemies. He also argued strongly that the first victim of the Plot, the young Catholic banker William Staley, was innocent, although his narrative of Staley's trial was undoubtedly coloured by his detestation of William Carstares, the Crown's chief witness at Staley's trial. Whether the Catholic nobleman William Howard, 1st Viscount Stafford, executed for treason in 1680, was innocent or guilty he regarded as a mystery whose solution must await "the great revelation of all secrets".

== History of the Reformation ==
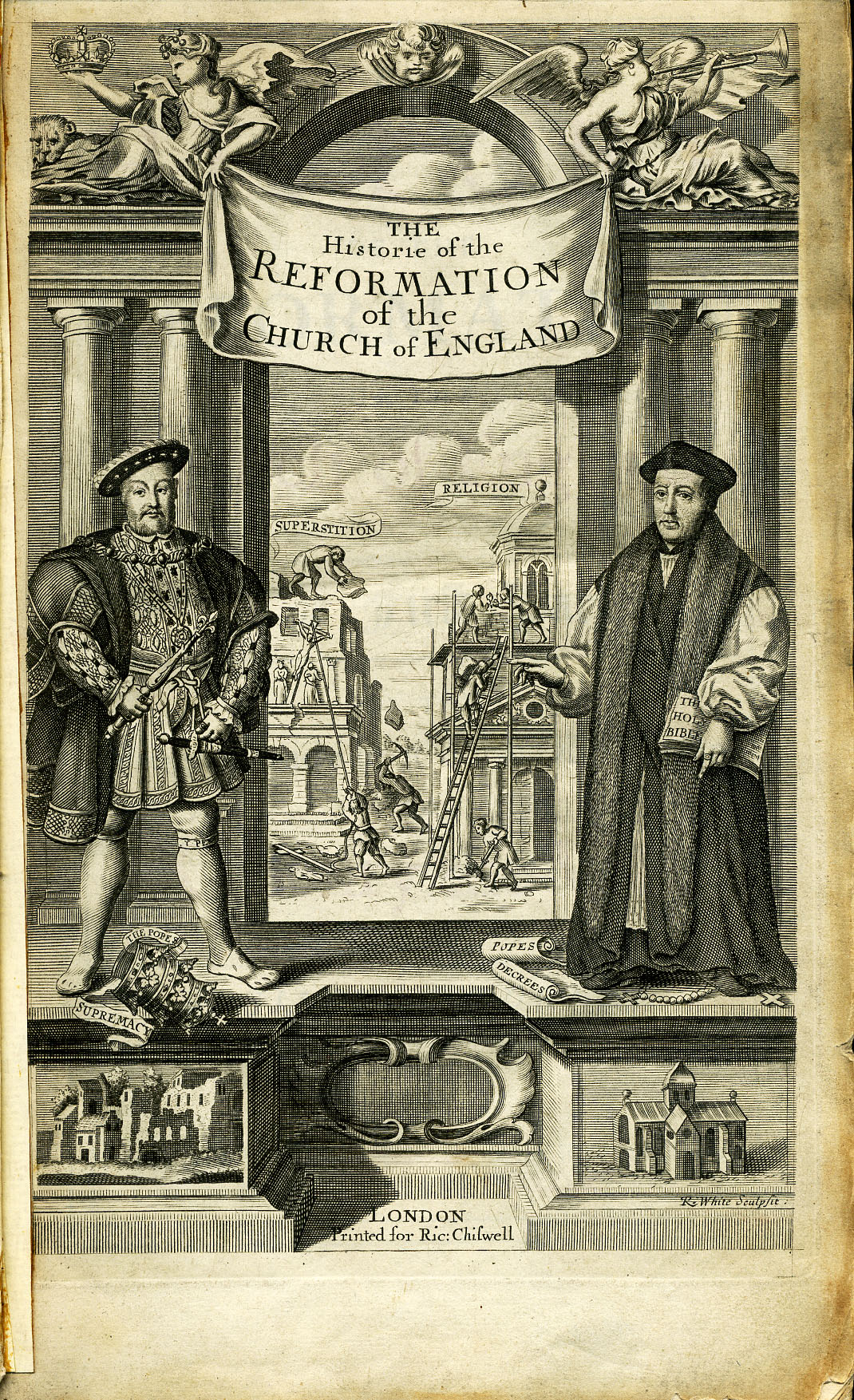
Engraved Title page of the first volume of The History of the Reformation of the Church of England.

In the mid-1670s, a French translation of Nicholas Sanders' De origine et progressu schismatis Anglicani libri tres (1585) appeared. Sanders attacked the English Reformation as a political act carried on by a corrupt king. Several of Burnet's friends wished him to publish a rebuttal of the work, so in 1679 his first volume of The History of the Reformation of the Church of England was published. This covered the reign of Henry VIII; the second volume (1681) covered the reign of Elizabeth I and the Elizabethan Religious Settlement; the third volume (1715) consisted of corrections and additional material. His literary reputation was greatly enhanced by this publication. The Parliament of England voted thanks for Burnet after the publication of the first volume, and in 1680 the University of Oxford awarded Burnet the degree of Doctor of Divinity on the advice of William Sancroft, Archbishop of Canterbury. For over a century this was the standard reference work in the field, although Catholics disputed some of its content.

Initial publication of the three volumes of the History of the Reformation

These early editions of Gilbert Burnet's The History of the Reformation of the Church of England were all published in London:

- 1679 : first edition of Volume 1, that is, The First Part, of the Progress made in it during the Reign of K. Henry the VIII. London: Richard Chiswell.
- 1681 : second edition of Volume 1. London: Richard Chiswell.
- 1681 : first edition of Volume 2, that is, The Second Part, of the Progress made in it till the Settlement of it in the beginning of Q. Elizabeths Reign. London: Richard Chiswell.
- 1683 : second edition of Volume 2. London: Richard Chiswell.
- 1714 : An Introduction to the Third Volume of The History of the Reformation of the Church of England. London: John Churchill. 72 pages. The text of this Introduction was reprinted the following year in Volume 3.
- 1715 : first edition of Volume 3, that is, The Third Part. Being Supplement to the Two Volumes formerly publish'd. London: John Churchill.
- 1715 : fourth edition of Volume 1. London: Daniel Midwinter; and Benjamin Cowse.
- 1715 : fourth edition of Volume 2. London: Daniel Midwinter; and Benjamin Cowse.

Although a "fourth" edition was published in 1715 by Midwinter and by Cowse, a third edition of these volumes was neither prepared nor published by Burnet.

== Exile: 1685–1688 ==
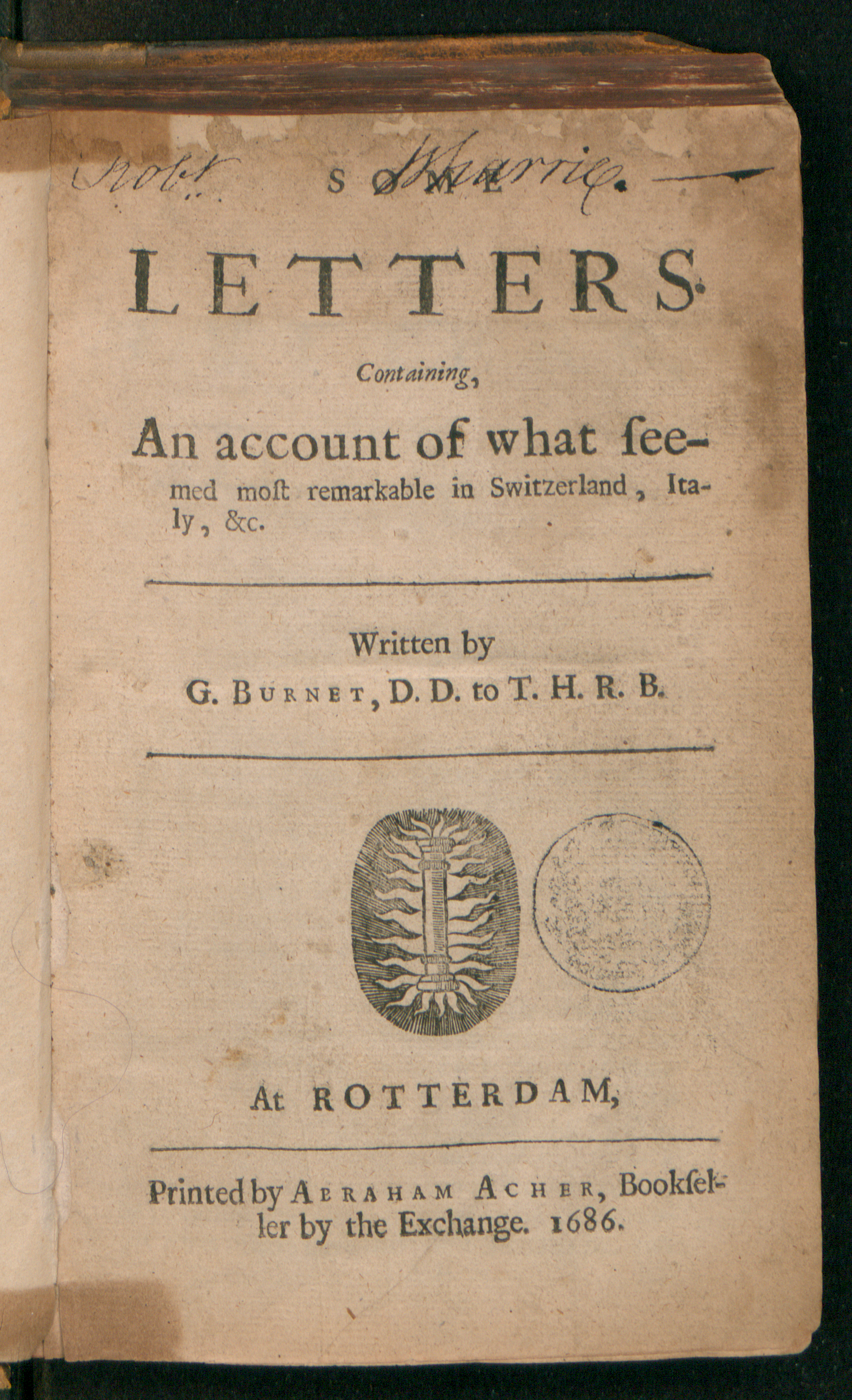
Some letters containing an account of what seemed most remarkable in Switzerland, Italy, 1686

Upon the succession of the Roman Catholic King James II in 1685, Burnet requested permission to go abroad, to which request James heartily consented. Burnet left on 11 May and reached Paris at the end of that month. He then travelled through Switzerland to Italy, where Pope Innocent XI offered him an audience, which Burnet declined on account of his poor knowledge of the Italian language. We cannot know whether a personal meeting with the Pope would have altered Burnet's low opinion of him (in his History he describes Innocent as "jealous, fearful and extremely ignorant," a view not shared by most later historians). After more months of travelling across France, Switzerland and Germany he arrived at Utrecht, Netherlands, in May 1686. He was sent letters from the court of William, Prince of Orange, and his wife Princess Mary inviting him to take up residence at The Hague. This courting of Burnet infuriated James and under his pressure he was formally dismissed from court, but still kept in contact with William and Mary. It was Burnet who pointed out that William's marriage to Mary did not in itself entitle him to reign jointly with her if she became Queen, and that further steps would be necessary to ensure his right to the throne.

In 1687, in light of James's policy of wanting to receive William and Mary's support for the repeal of the Test Act, Burnet wrote a pamphlet against repeal. William and Mary declined to support repeal, apparently on Burnet's advice. Burnet also upset James by becoming engaged to the wealthy heiress Mary (Maria) Scott (his first wife Lady Margaret had died in 1685). James prosecuted Burnet for high treason in Scotland, accusing him of corresponding with Archibald Campbell, 9th Earl of Argyll, and others convicted of high treason. To safeguard Burnet, the States General of the Netherlands naturalised him without opposition, and James's request for Burnet's extradition was declined. Burnet and Mary Scott were married and the marriage proved to be a happy one. Burnet, who had long been resigned to being childless since as his first wife Lady Margaret Kennedy had been nearly twenty years his senior, quickly found himself the father of a growing family.

He translated an open letter written by Gaspar Fagel, William's grand pensionary, setting out a policy of lifting disabilities on non-conformists while retaining them on Catholics, which provided an alternative to the dissenters of an alliance with James's court.

Burnet was not privy to William's decision-making process because he was apparently unable to keep a secret; he was not, for example, informed of William's planned invasion of England until July 1688. However, his help was needed to translate William's Declaration which was to be distributed in England after his landing. When William's fleet set sail for England in October 1688, Burnet was made William's chaplain.

== Glorious Revolution ==
William landed at Torbay on 5 November. When Burnet came ashore he hastened to William and eagerly inquired of him what William now intended to do. William regarded the interference in military matters by non-military personnel with disgust, but he was in good humour at this moment, and responded with a delicate reproof: "Well, Doctor, what do you think of predestination now?"

Burnet was appointed to preach the coronation sermon, on 11 April 1689.

He was appointed tutor to the future Queen Anne's only surviving child, Prince William, Duke of Gloucester, in 1698. He attempted to refuse the appointment, knowing that Anne, who instinctively disliked anyone whom William favored, was strongly opposed to it, but the King was adamant, despite Burnet's plea that he was still in mourning for his second wife Mary Scott, who had recently died of smallpox while on a visit to Rotterdam. The appointment was unwelcome to most of Anne's household as well as to the Princess herself, but as Burnet recalled cheerfully, "I lived with them well enough." He was well known for having no feelings to be hurt. After Mary's death, Burnet, in 1700, married, as his third wife, Elizabeth Berkeley (née Blake): his choice of her met with general approval, as Elizabeth had been Mary's best friend, and Mary herself had told her husband that should he outlive her, she would wish him to marry Elizabeth.

== Bishop of Salisbury ==
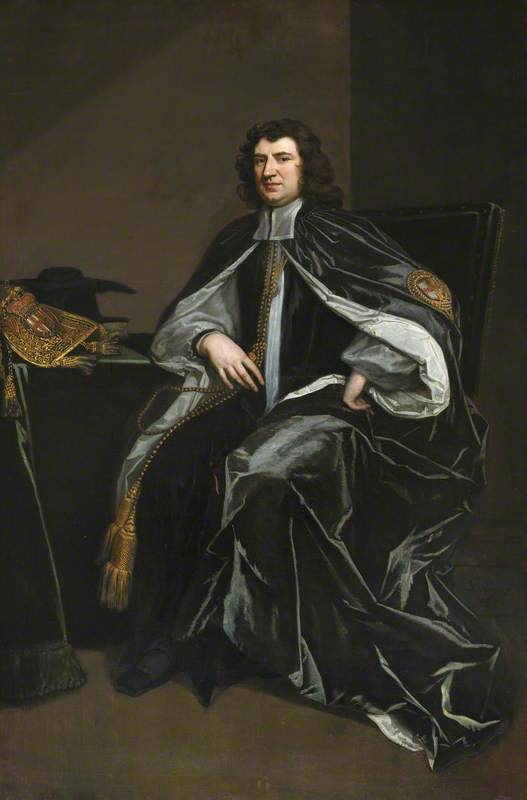
Gilbert Burnet was consecrated Bishop of Salisbury on Easter 1689.

At Easter 1689, Burnet was consecrated Bishop of Salisbury and three days later was sworn as Chancellor of the Order of the Garter. His tenure as bishop is noted for his liberal views and zealous discharge of duty.

His jurisdiction extended over Wiltshire and Berkshire. These counties he divided into districts which he sedulously visited. About two months of every summer he passed in preaching, catechizing, and confirming daily from church to church. When he died there was no corner of his diocese in which the people had not had seven or eight opportunities of receiving his instructions and of asking his advice. The worst weather, the worst roads, did not prevent him from discharging these duties. On one occasion, when the floods were out, he exposed his life to imminent risk rather than disappoint a rural congregation which was in expectation of a discourse from the Bishop. The poverty of the inferior clergy was a constant cause of uneasiness to his kind and generous heart. He was indefatigable and at length successful in his attempts to obtain for them from the Crown that grant which is known by the name of Queen Anne's Bounty. He was especially careful, when he travelled through his diocese, to lay no burden on them. Instead of requiring them to entertain him, he entertained them. He always fixed his headquarters at a market town, kept a table there, and by his decent hospitality and munificent charities, tried to conciliate those who were prejudiced against his doctrines. When he bestowed a poor benefice, and he had many such to bestow, his practice was to add out of his own purse twenty pounds a year to the income. Ten promising young men, to each of whom he allowed thirty pounds a year, studied divinity under his own eye in the close of Salisbury.

== Under Queen Anne ==
He was present at King William's deathbed, and with that knack for appearing absurd which sometimes detracted from his genuine gifts, he rushed in haste to be the first to break the news to the new Queen, and went on his knees in front of her, only to find himself "generally laughed at". He was out of royal favour in the reign of Queen Anne: apart from Anne's reflexive hostility to anyone whom King William had favoured, she apparently thought Burnet to be something of a buffoon, although he could sometimes be an entertaining one. Nonetheless, like her four royal predecessors, she occasionally confided in him. In 1713 he warned her of an impending Jacobite invasion: the Queen, unimpressed, noted drily that while Burnet apparently considered himself to be all-knowing, she could not help recalling that he had made a similar prophecy the previous year, which had proved to be entirely groundless.

He was nominated by John Tillotson, Archbishop of Canterbury, to write answers to the works sponsored by Tillotson's friend, the Socinian businessman and philanthropist Thomas Firmin, who was funding the printing of Socinian tracts by Stephen Nye. Yet neither Burnet nor Tillotson was entirely unsympathetic to non-conformism. Of the Athanasian Creed, the new Archbishop of Canterbury wrote to the new Bishop of Salisbury, "I wish we were well rid of it".

== Last years and death ==
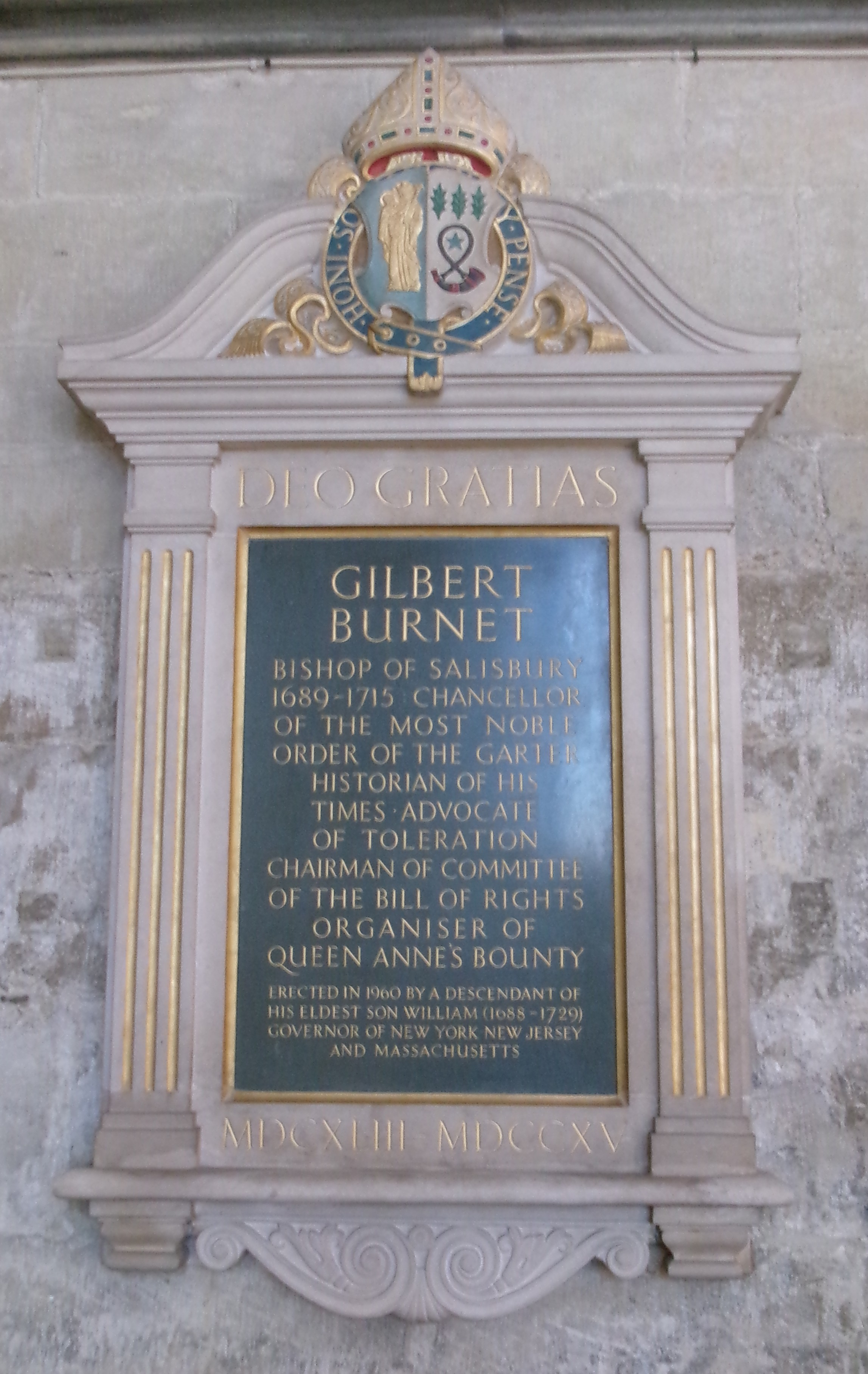
Monument to Bishop Gilbert Burnet in Salisbury Cathedral

In 1714, as Queen Anne approached death, Burnet became briefly, and in the opinion of his critics, somewhat hysterically concerned about the dire consequences for Protestants if her Catholic half-brother, the Old Pretender, succeeded to the throne. His predictions of doom were received with general scepticism: "Be easy my Lord, and disturb not the peace of your old age with vain imaginings of a second Revolution and a flight to Holland... I am sure you need not die a martyr for your faith", wrote one correspondent acidly. In the event, the throne passed peacefully to the Protestant House of Hanover in August 1714, seven months before Burnet's own death.

Burnet died of a fever on 17 March 1715, having been ill for only three days. His mood in his final days was described as being calm, cheerful and absolutely resigned to death. His will has been called one of those rare dispositions of one's property which please everyone: one-third of his estate was left to his eldest son and the rest was divided among the other four children. What happened to his daughter Elizabeth's share of the money is something of a puzzle, as she is known to have spent her last years in poverty.

== History of His Own Time ==
Burnet began Bishop Burnet's History of His Own Time in 1683, covering the English Civil War and the Commonwealth of England to the Treaty of Utrecht of 1713. The first volume was published in 1724, ending before the Glorious Revolution. In 1734 the second volume was published, taking the History to the Treaty of Utrecht. A critical edition in six volumes with numerous footnotes was edited by Martin Routh and published by Oxford University Press in 1823 (updated 1833). The work gives a sketch of the history of the Civil Wars and Commonwealth, and a detailed account of the immediately succeeding period down to 1713. While not free from egotism and some party feeling, it is written with a sincere desire for accuracy and fairness, and it has largely the authority of an eyewitness. The style, if somewhat lacking in dignity, is lively and picturesque. James Ralph's The History of England, During the Reigns of King William, Queen Anne, and King George I (1744–46) later criticised Burnet's anecdotal style, corrected specific factual errors, and faulted his omissions.

A supplemental biography of Burnet, titled A Supplement to Burnet's History of my Own Time and edited by H. C. Foxcroft and T. E. S. Clarke, was published in 1902.

== Theology ==
After 1664, Burnet developed relations with the Dutch Arminians, with among them Jean Le Clerc, and Philipp van Limborch. He then rejected his Calvinist soteriology for an Arminian one. Besides, Gilbert is counted among the Latitudinarian divines with distinctive theological characteristics of thought. In particular he was attacked for his latitude in the interpretation of the Thirty-Nine Articles which could encompass an Arminian reading.

Among his works is Lives, characters, and an address to posterity.

== Family ==
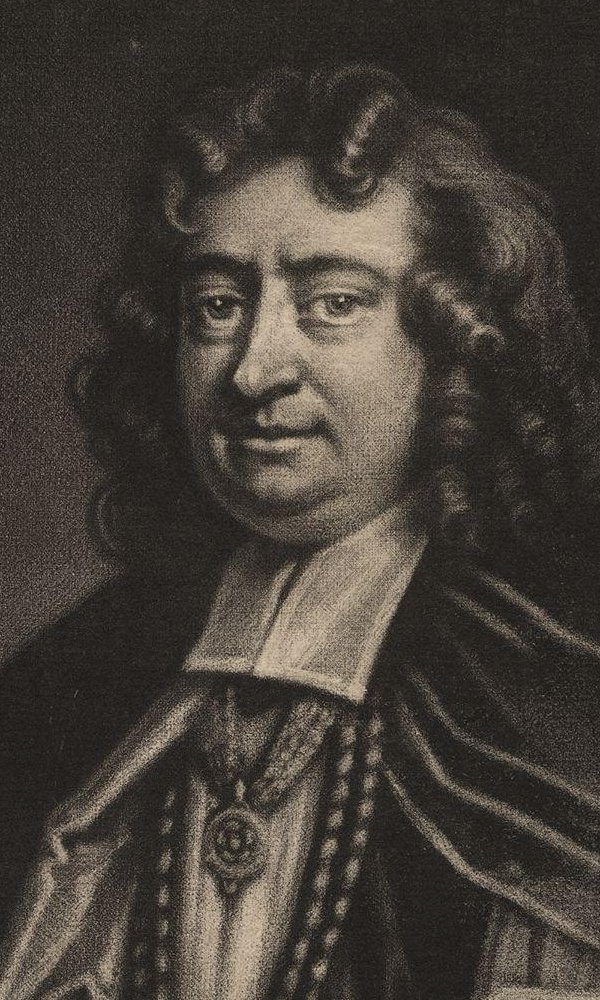
Gilbert Burnet had three wives in succession: Lady Margaret Kennedy, Mary Scott, and Elizabeth Berkeley.

He married three times, firstly, c. 1672 to Lady Margaret Kennedy, daughter of John Kennedy, 6th Earl of Cassilis and his wife Lady Jean Hamilton. Margaret was a lady famous for her beauty and strength of character, and was many years older than her husband. The marriage was kept secret for some time, and Gilbert renounced any claim to his wife's fortune. She is said to have lost her memory completely some time before she died in 1685.

He was married, secondly, in 1687 to Mary Scott (Maria Schotte) (1660–1698), a Dutch heiress of Scots descent: she was a granddaughter of the prominent statesman and jurist Apollonius Schotte. Although Mary brought him a fortune, it was generally regarded as a love match on both sides: Mary, whose wealth gave her an unusual degree of freedom for a woman of her time, had always maintained that she would only marry a man she really cared for. She died of smallpox while visiting Rotterdam on business in 1698.

He married, thirdly, in 1700 Elizabeth Berkeley (née Blake), widow of Robert Berkeley, and daughter of Sir Richard Blake of Clerkenwell; she was a religious writer of some note. She died in 1709. This marriage was largely the work of Burnet's second wife Mary, who, apprehensive that she might die on her last visit to Rotterdam, where the smallpox was raging, advised Burnet in the event of her death to marry Elizabeth, who was a close friend of hers.

All his surviving children were by Mary Scott; Elizabeth bore two daughters who died young.

By Mary he had five sons of whom two died young. The three surviving sons were:

- William Burnet, the Royal governor of New Jersey (1720–1728), and later of Massachusetts and New Hampshire;
- Gilbert Burnet, the pamphleteer;
- Thomas Burnet, judge of the Court of Common Pleas

He and Mary also had twin daughters :

- Mary, who married David Mitchell, nephew and heir of Admiral Sir David Mitchell.
- Elizabeth, who married Richard West, a distinguished lawyer who became Lord Chancellor of Ireland, by whom she was the mother of Richard West the younger, the poet and friend of Thomas Gray.

Burnet was a devoted parent and all his children were deeply attached to him. Even Thomas, whose youthful reputation for debauchery caused his father much distress, sincerely mourned "the best of fathers".

Influential close relatives include Burnet's mother's brother Archibald Johnston and his son James Johnston.

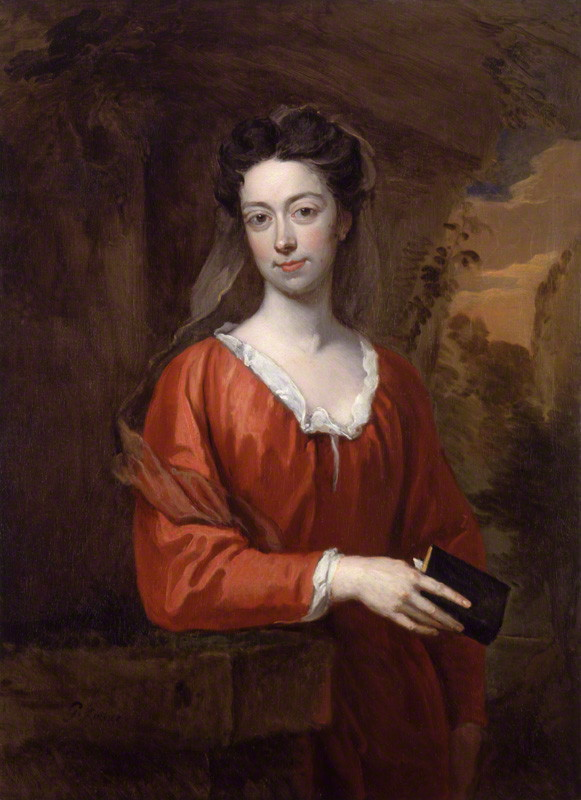
Burnet's third wife Elizabeth Berkeley, portrait by Sir Godfrey Kneller 1707

== Personality ==
Thomas Babington Macaulay describes Burnet in relation to the king he served, William of Orange:

When the doctor took liberties, which was not seldom the case, his patron became more than usually cold and sullen, and sometimes uttered a short dry sarcasm which would have struck dumb any person of ordinary assurance. In spite of such occurrences, however, the amity between this singular pair continued, with some temporary interruptions, till it was dissolved by death. Indeed it was not easy to wound Burnet's feelings. His self-complacency, his animal spirits, and his want of tact, were such that, though he frequently gave offence, he never took it. —History of England, Vol. 2, Ch 7.

In J.P. Kenyon's view Burnet's great gifts never quite received the recognition they deserved, perhaps because there was always "something of the buffoon" about him.

== Notes and references ==
=== Sources ===
- Griffin, Martin Ignatius Joseph (1992). Latitudinarianism in the Seventeenth-Century Church of England. Leiden: E. J. Brill.
- Clarke, T. E. S. (1907). A Life of Gilbert Burnet, Bishop of Salisbury. Cambridge: Cambridge university press.
- Hampton, Stephen (2008). Anti-Arminians: The Anglican Reformed Tradition from Charles II to George I. Oxford: Oxford University Press.

Church of England titles
Preceded by Seth Ward	Bishop of Salisbury; 1689–1715	Succeeded by William Talbot
