= Heracleides (rhetor) =

Heracleides (Ancient Greek: Ἡρακλείδης) was a rhetorician from Lycia, who lived and taught in Athens and Smyrna in the second century AD.

== Life ==
Heracleides was a disciple of Herodes Atticus. We know him to have been a man of great skill, on whom was bestowed the imperial chair of rhetoric in Athens. There is a great deal of debate over what years precisely he held this position, but with the evidence we currently have it seems likely to assume he held this from 193 to 209. At the same time, we know him to have been somewhat embattled in his position: at one point before the year 203 he lost in a contest of oratory against Apollonius of Athens so profoundly that he displeased the Roman emperor Septimius Severus, and the emperor revoked Heracleides's immunity from civic duty. He also had little support from the local aristocracy, and therefore had no defense from the many enemies he had in the city. These enemies, led by Marcianus, successfully conspired to have Heracleides deposed from his position. Heracleides thereafter left Athens, and began teaching in Smyrna.

He taught rhetoric at Smyrna with great success, so that the town was greatly benefited by him, on account of the great conflux of students from all parts of Asia Minor. He died at the age of eighty, leaving a country-house in the neighborhood of Smyrna, which he had built with the money he had earned, and which he called Rhetorica.

== Works ==
He owed his success not so much to his talent as to his indefatigable industry; and once, when he had composed an ἐγκώμιον πόνου ("Praise of work"), and showed it to his rival Ptolemaeus, the latter struck out the π in πόνου, and, returning it to Heracleides, said, "There, you may read your own encomium" (ἐγκώμιον ὄνου meaning "Praise of the donkey")). He also published a purified edition of the orations of Nicetes, forgetting, as his biographer says, that he was putting the armor of a pigmy on a colossus.
