= Lady Margaret Burnet =

- Born: Lady Margaret Kennedy
- Died: May 1685
- Spouse: Gilbert Burnet
- Father: John Kennedy, 6th Earl of Cassilis
- Mother: Lady Jean Hamilton

Lady Margaret Burnet (née Kennedy; died May 1685) was a Scottish religious and political adviser.

== Biography ==
Burnet was born Lady Margaret Kennedy to John Kennedy, 6th Earl of Cassilis, a politician, and Lady Jean Hamilton (1607–1642), the daughter of the lawyer and politician Thomas Hamilton, 1st Earl of Haddington. She was well-regarded as a political advisor. King Charles II spoke of her favourably and John Maitland, 1st Duke of Lauderdale referred to her in correspondence as "wife". Their letters were discovered and published in 1828.

She was the first wife of Gilbert Burnet, the eminent Whig historian and later Bishop of Salisbury. They married in 1672 or 1673 in secret as there was a large difference in both their ages and their wealth. He was concerned that observers might speculate that he had married Margaret primarily for her wealth. For this reason, he arranged for what is now called a prenuptial agreement where he renounced all claims to her money. It has been speculated that she married on the rebound, after she discovered that Lauderdale's first wife, Lady Anne Home, had died and that he had remarried his formidable second wife Lady Elizabeth Murray.

After the fact of her marriage became well known she moved to London and lived with Burnet. In the 1680s she lost her memory and all recall of facts and people. Margaret died at the end of May 1685.
