= Apollonius of Clazomenae =

Apollonius of Clazomenae (Ancient Greek: Άπολλώνιος) was an ambassador among a delegation, together with Apollonides of Clazomenae, who was sent from Clazomenae to the Seleucid ruler Antiochus IV Epiphanes in 170 BCE, after the latter had made himself master of Egypt.
