= Apollonius the Apologist =

Christian martyr and apologist

Saint Apollonius the Apologist
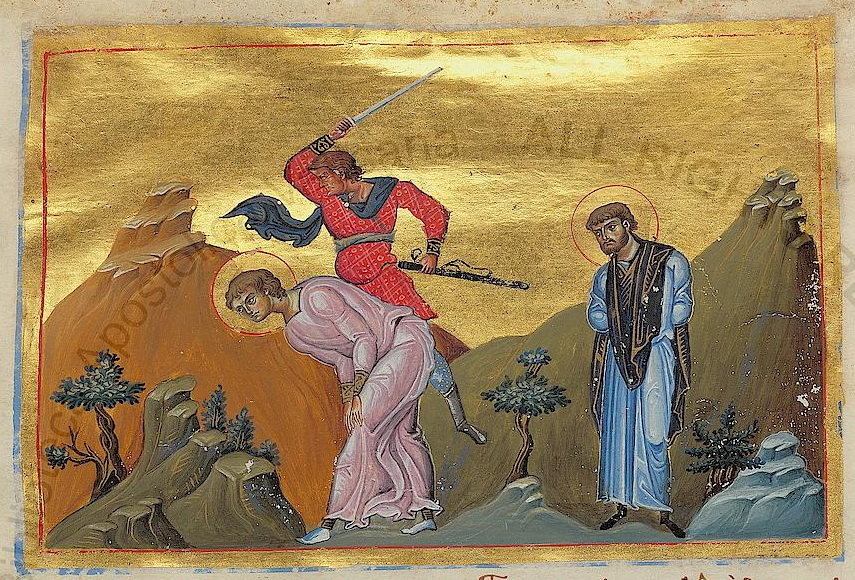
- Philemon and Apollonius

Martyr and Apologist
- Born: 105; Rome
- Died: 21 April 185; Rome
- Venerated in: Roman Catholic Church, Eastern Orthodox Church
- Canonized: Pre-congregation
- Feast: 18 April; July 23 (Eastern Orthodox Church)

Apollonius the Apologist or Apollonius of Rome (Greek: Ἀπολλώνιος; died 21 April 185) was a 2nd-century Christian martyr and apologist who was martyred in 185 under the Emperor Commodus (161–192).

== Life ==
Four different sources speak of Apollonius of Rome:

- a record of the trial incorporated into the Ecclesiastical History of Eusebius of Caesarea (265–340);
- chapters 40 and 42 of the De Viris Illustribus by Jerome (347–420),
- two versions of the Passio of Apollonius, one Greek, the other Armenian, which were discovered in the late 19th century.

These sources present Apollonius as an illustrious Roman, even, it seems, a senator, and an exceedingly talented man, well versed in philosophy. He was denounced as a Christian to the Pretorian Prefect Perennius. Summoned to defend himself, he read to the senate, according to Jerome, "a remarkable volume" in which, instead of recanting, he defended the Christian faith. As a result, he was condemned to death on the basis of the law established by the Emperor Trajan. This defence was later translated into Greek and inserted by church historian Eusebius in his history of the Christian martyrs, but is now lost.

The sources say he was subjected to two investigations, the first by the Prefect Perennius, the second, three days later, by a group of senators and jurists. The hearings were conducted in a calm and courteous manner. Apollonius was permitted to speak with only rare interruptions, aimed at getting him to tone down his remarks, which were making him liable to punishment.

Apollonius was not afraid to die, because, he said: "There is waiting for me something better: eternal life, given to the person who has lived well on earth." And he argued for the superiority of Christianity's concepts of death and life.

The sources disagree on the manner of his death. The Greek Passio says he died after having his legs crushed, a punishment inflicted also on the slave who denounced him; but in the Armenian account he is decapitated.

== Veneration ==
Apollonius was not mentioned in the earliest Christian martyrologies, not being at first the object of individual commemoration. In the Middle Ages he was confused with two other saints, Apollo of Alexandria and the Apollonius who was martyred with Valentine and whose feast is on 18 April. As a result, this date was attributed also to Saint Apollonius of Rome, even in editions of the Roman Martyrology, the latest editions of which have, however, restored the date of 21 April.

The account in the Roman Martyrology (21 April) is as follows:

At Rome, commemoration of Saint Apollonius, philosopher and martyr. Under the Emperor Commodus, he defended, before the Prefect Perennius and the Senate, the cause of the Christian faith in a finely argued address, and then, after being condemned to death, confirmed it by the witness of his blood.
