= Alabanda coat of arms =

Polish coat of arms

Alabanda
- Alternative names: Alaband, Albalant, Alba Luna, Albaluna, Alba-luna, Allabanda, Bielina, Koniczek, Koniowaszyja
- Earliest mention: 1278
- Families: 6 names Alabanda, Azulewicz, Frezer, Fryzer, Koproski, Koprowski

Alabanda is a Polish nobility coat of arms, used by several szlachta families in the times of the Kingdom of Poland.

== History ==
According to a legend the Alabanda coat of arms comes from the times of the Piast dynasty in the 12th century. It was first mentioned in records in 1278 and no longer used after the 16th century.

== Blazon ==
Escutcheon: Sable (or Azure) a horse head Argent issuant from a crescent of the same. Crest: Three (or five) ostrich feathers.

== Notable bearers ==
Notable bearers of this coat of arms include:

- Stefan de Kobylagłowa
- Strzeżywoj de Kobylagłowa
- Jan Frezer, burgrave of Kraków, secretary of the Tarnogród Confederation

== Gallery ==
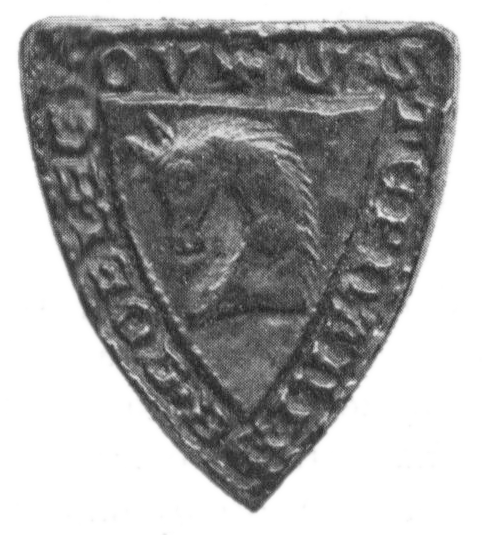
Seal of Stefan de Kobylaglowa from 1278

== See also ==
- Polish heraldry
- Heraldic family
- List of Polish nobility coats of arms

== Bibliography ==
- Tadeusz Gajl: Herbarz polski od średniowiecza do XX wieku : ponad 4500 herbów szlacheckich 37 tysięcy nazwisk 55 tysięcy rodów. L&L, 2007. ISBN 978-83-60597-10-1.
- Franciszek Piekosiński: Heraldyka polska wieków średnich, Kraków, 1899, s.196
- Juliusz Karol Ostrowski: Księga herbowa rodów polskich, Warszawa, 1897, T.1, s.10
- Franciszek Piekosiński, Pieczęcie polskie str. 123
- Józef Szymański: Herbarz rycerstwa polskiego z XVI wieku. Warszawa: DiG, 2001, s. 19. ISBN 83-7181-217-5.
