= Apollonius of Tyre (philosopher) =

Hellenistic-era philosopher

Apollonius of Tyre (Greek: Ἀπολλώνιος ὁ Τύριος; fl. 50 BC), was a Stoic philosopher.

Strabo describes him as living "a little before my time," and says he wrote "a tabulated account of the philosophers of the school of Zeno and of their books," and which appears to have been a short survey of the philosophers and their writings from the time of Zeno. He is mentioned by Diogenes Laërtius as the author of a work on Zeno. Whether this Apollonius is the same as the one who wrote a work on female philosophers, or as the author of the chronological work (Greek: Χρονικά) of which Stephanus of Byzantium quotes the fourth book, is uncertain.
