= Apollonius of Laodicea =

Ancient Greek astrologer

Apollonius (Ancient Greek: Άπολλώνιος) of Laodicea was a writer of ancient Greece who was said to have written five books on astrology (astrologia apotelesmatica) in which he accused the Egyptians of various astronomical errors. In the Bibliothèque nationale de France there exists a manuscript containing Apotelesmata of one Apollonius, which German classical scholar Johann Albert Fabricius believed to be the work of Apollonius of Laodicea.
