= Apollonius of Drepanum =

Apollonius of Drepanum (or Apollonius of Drepana), from the ancient city of Drepana (modern Trapani, in Sicily), was a wealthy Sicilian figure active in the 1st century BCE. The son of Nicon, Apollonius was known for his extravagant lifestyle and for acquiring wealth through the exploitation of orphans. His fortunes later suffered under the misrule of the Roman governor Gaius Verres, who is alleged to have plundered Apollonius in turn. After obtaining Roman citizenship, Apollonius took the name Aulus Clodius.
