= Apollonius (son of Charinus) =

Apollonius (Ancient Greek: Άπολλώνιος), son of Charinus, was appointed by Alexander the Great, before leaving Egypt, as governor of the part of Libya on the confines of Egypt in 331 BCE.
