= Meilichios =

Epithet of Zeus in Greek religion

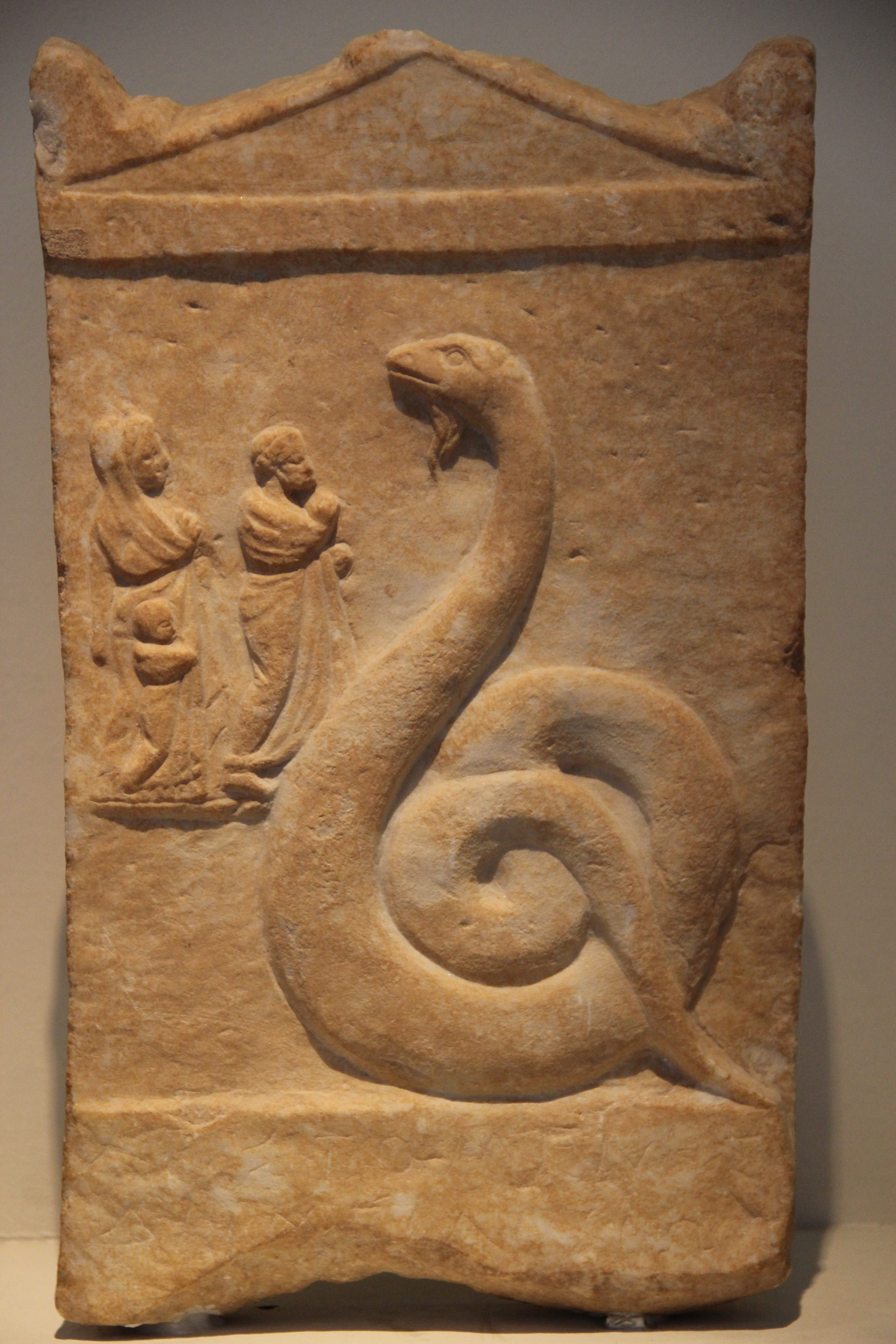
Zeus Meilichios depicted as a bearded serpent on a 4th-century BC votive relief from Athens

In Greek mythology, Meilichios was an archaic chthonic daimon honored in Athens. Meilichios was later worshipped as an epithet of Zeus, as Zeus Meilichius or Meilichios. The Attic Diasia festival was dedicated to Zeus Meilichios.

== Name ==
According to Robert Parker, his name roughly translates to "who can, but needs to, be propitiated". The name was euphemistic, designed to appease the god.

Suda wrote that Diasia (Διάσια) was a festival of Zeus Meilichios at Athens and it is called this from the verb διαφυγεῖν ("to escape" or "to flee") and the noun ἄσαι ("troubles" or "suffering"). However, modern scholars believe that this etymology is speculative and debate its accuracy.

== Cult and iconography ==
On votive reliefs from Athens and Piraeus, he was commonly portrayed as a serpent, though he can sometimes be found as a human. As a snake, he typically has a beard, most likely added to align with regular depictions of Zeus in ancient art. Attic reliefs of Zeus Meilichios, including some found at the Athenian Agora, seem to date to the 4th century BC. He had some of the avenging and fearful character of an Erynis, for Pausanias saw near the River Cephissus "an ancient altar of Zeus Meilichios; on it Theseus received purification from the descendants of Phytalos after he had slain among other robbers Sinis, who was related to himself". Meilichios' sacrifice was a holocaust, which was wholly consumed in fire and not shared by the votaries.

While bearing the name 'Zeus', Zeus Olympios, the great king of the gods, noticeably differs from Zeus Meilichios, a decidedly chthonian character, often portrayed as a snake, and as seen beforehand, they are not different manifestations of the same god. Whenever 'another Zeus' is mentioned, this always refers to Hades. Zeus Meilichios and Zeus Eubouleus are often referred to being alternate names for Hades.

Zeus Meilichios is also identified as Agathodaemon, or Agathos Daimon, meaning a 'noble spirit', which was a sort of a household god. Zeus Meilichios was invoked in one of the Orphic Hymns, addressed to Zeus under the name "Daimon". This represents an old serpentine aspect of Zeus associated with fortune.

Zeus Meilichios was also the subject of the Athenian Pompaia festival, which was held in the month of Maimakterion, and involved a procession carrying a ram's fleece (after it was slain in honour of Meilichios) and a caduceus.

== Gallery ==
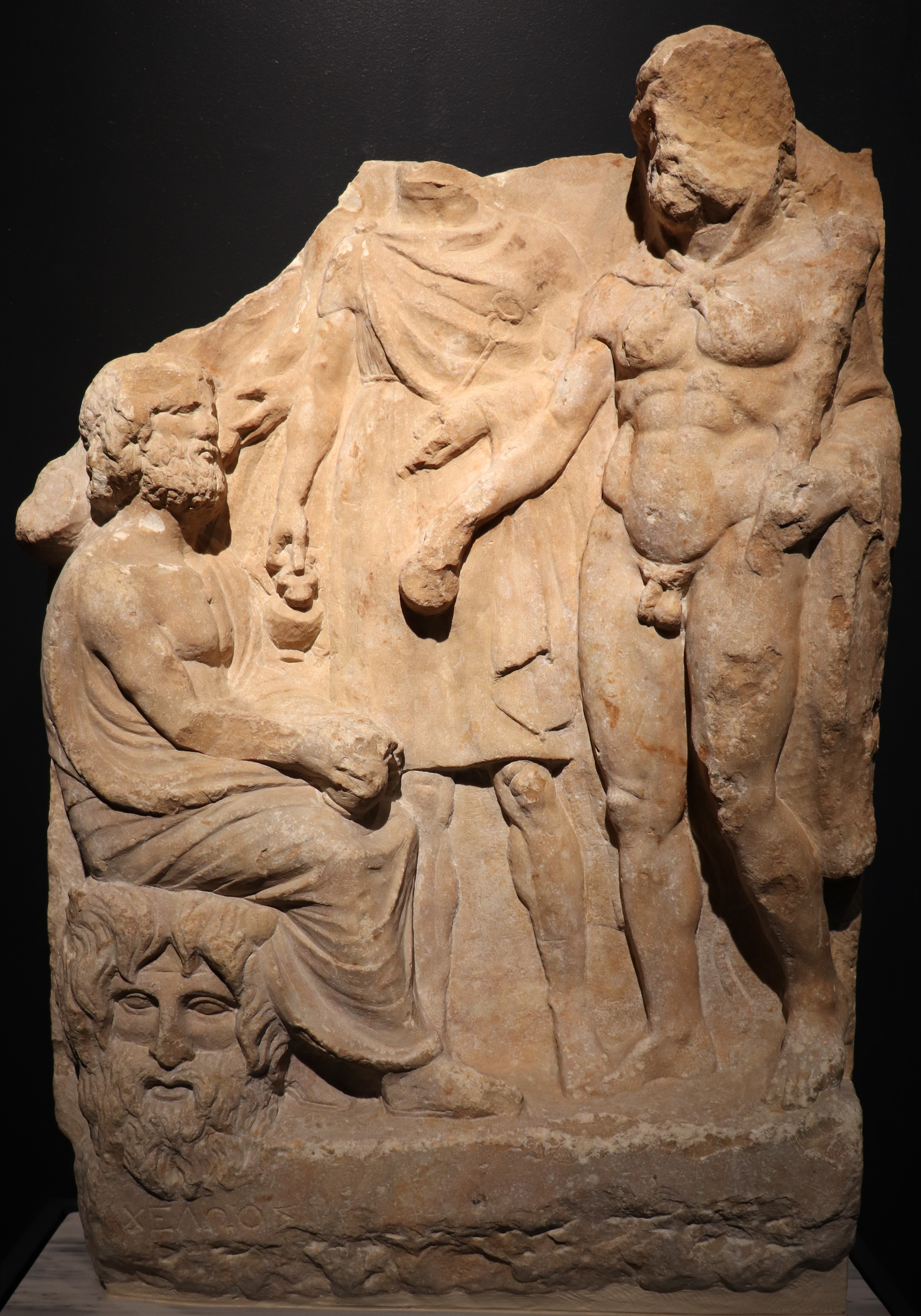
Marble votive relief of Zeus Meilichios sitting on the Acheloos River, with Hermes, Heracles, the Mother of the Gods, and Callirrhoe. Found in the Ilisos River, near Athens. Early 3rd century BC

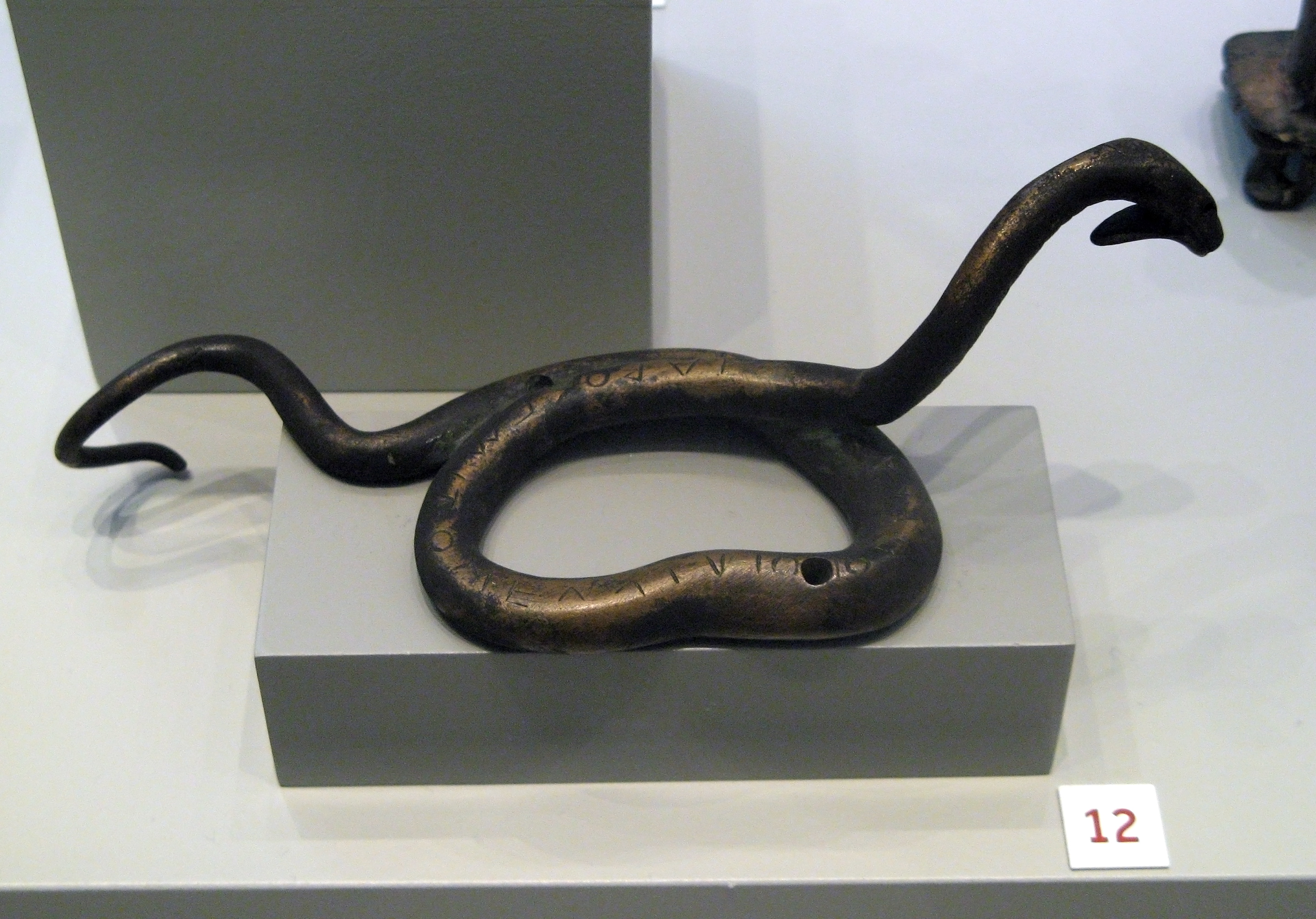
5th-century BC Bronze statuette of a serpent, with an inscription to Meilichios

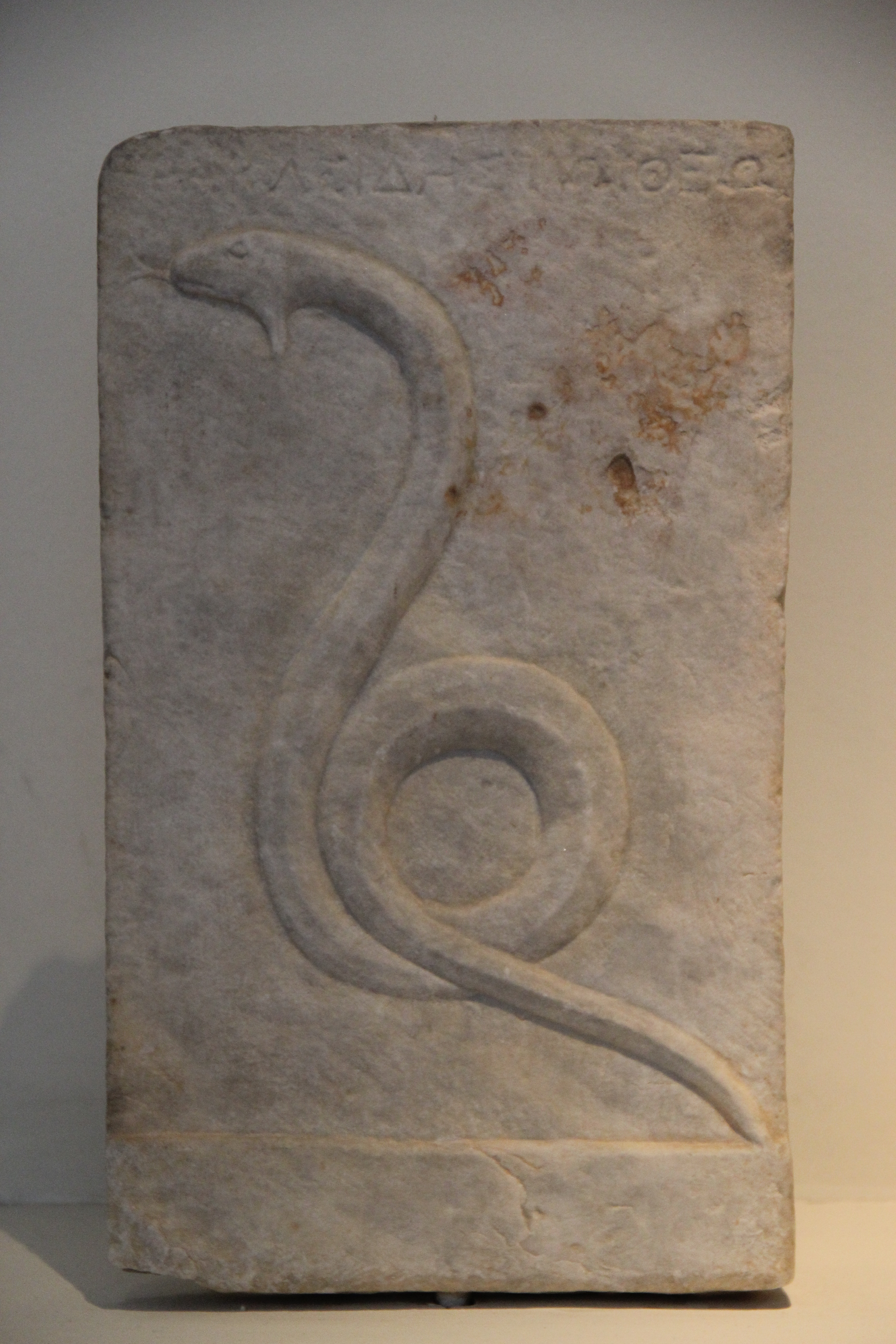
Zeus Meilichios as a snake, on a 4th-century BC votive relief from Piraeus

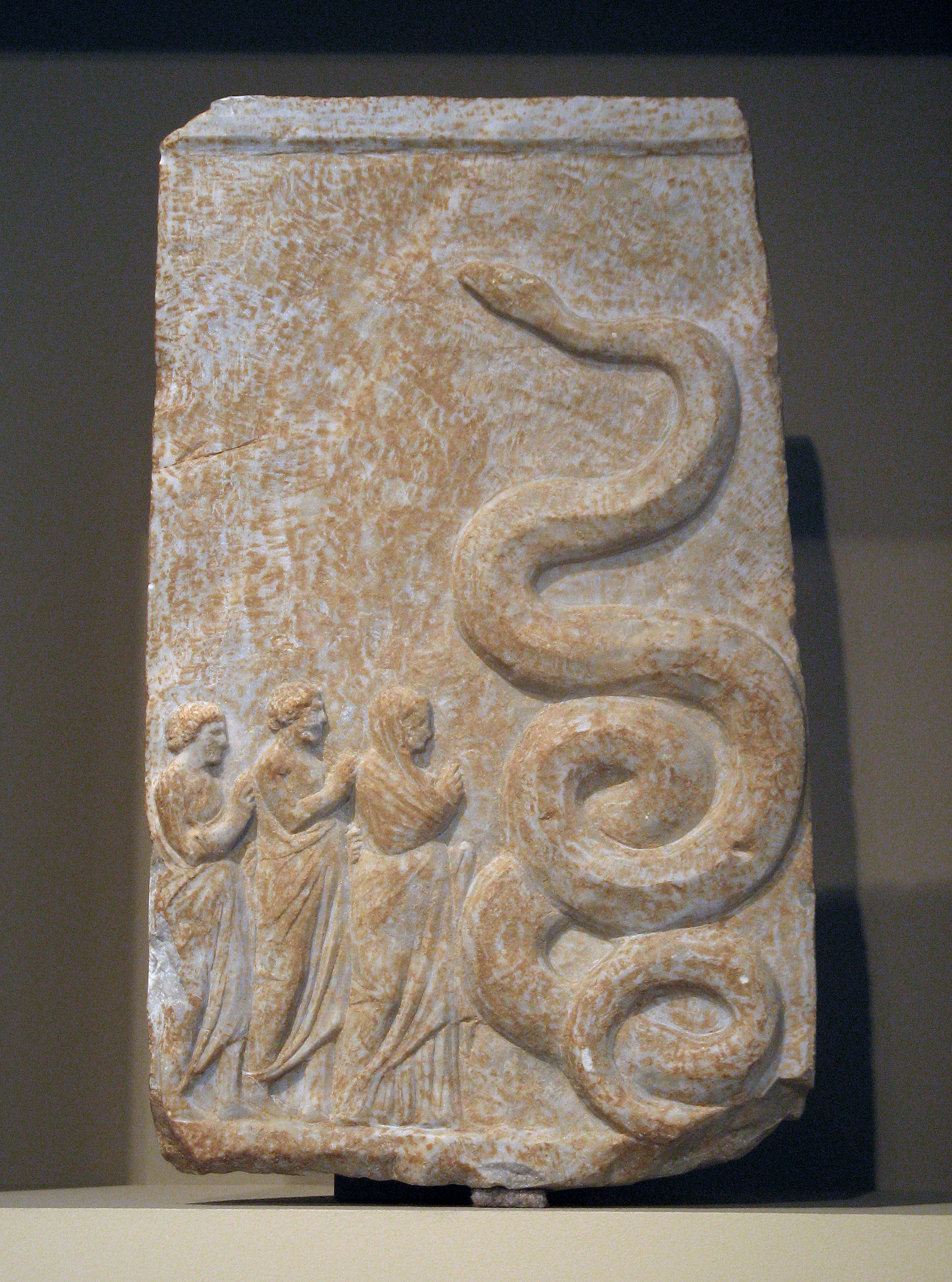
Zeus Meilichios as a snake, on a 4th-century BC votive relief from Athens, approached by three worshippers

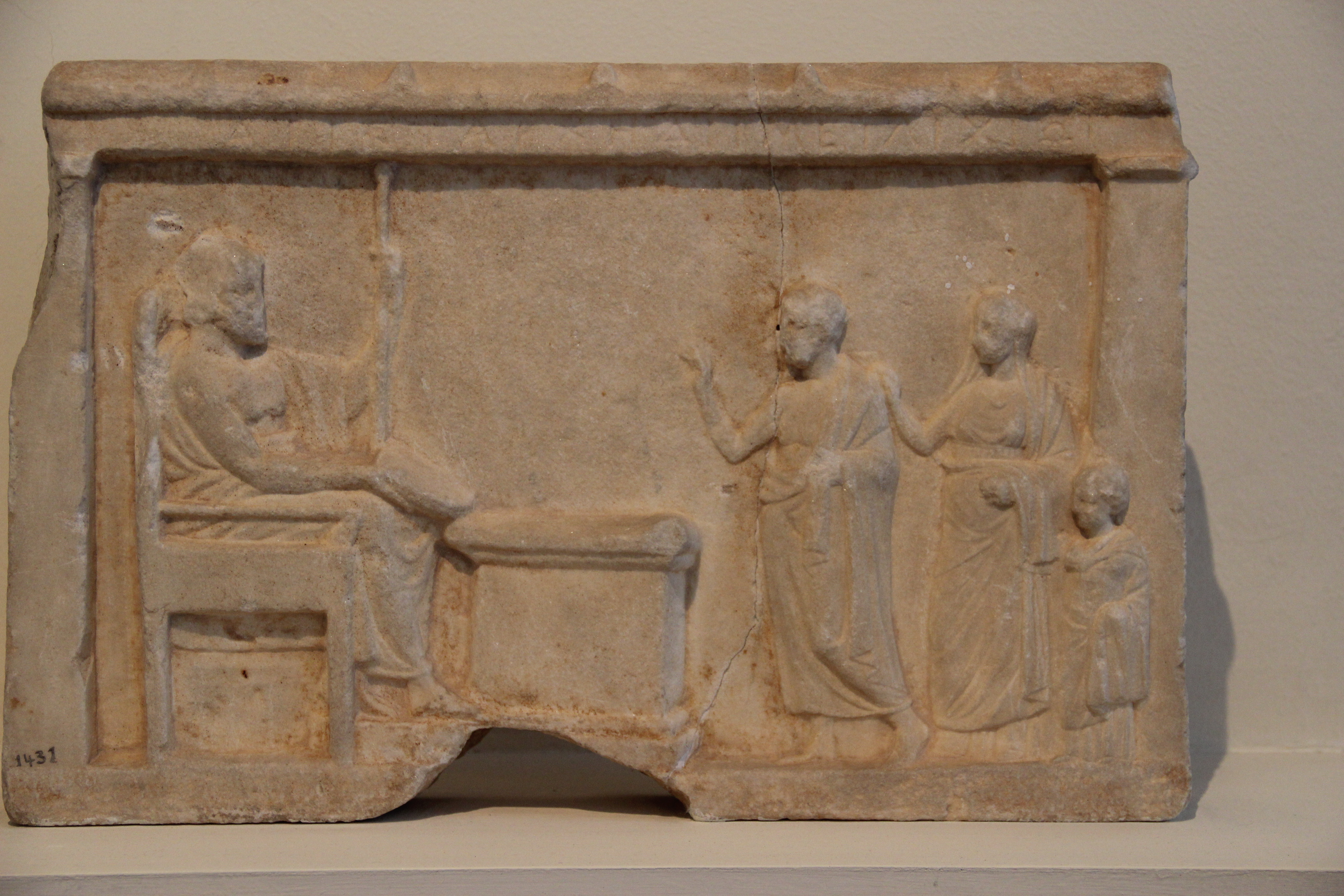
Attic votive relief from the 4th century BC, dedicated to either Zeus Philios or Meilichios. It shows a woman kneeling to him and a ram being sacrificed.
