= Apollonius (sculptor) =

Greek sculptor

Apollonius (Ancient Greek: Άπολλώνιος) was an obscure sculptor of ancient Greece. His name is inscribed on the marble statue of a young satyr – sometimes referred to as Satyr Pouring Wine (though different from the statue of that name by Praxiteles) – that was unearthed by archaeologist Gavin Hamilton in Campagna. We know that in the 19th century this statue was in the collection of the Earl of Egremont, at Petworth, Sussex; its current whereabouts are unknown.
