= Apollonius (son of Archias) =

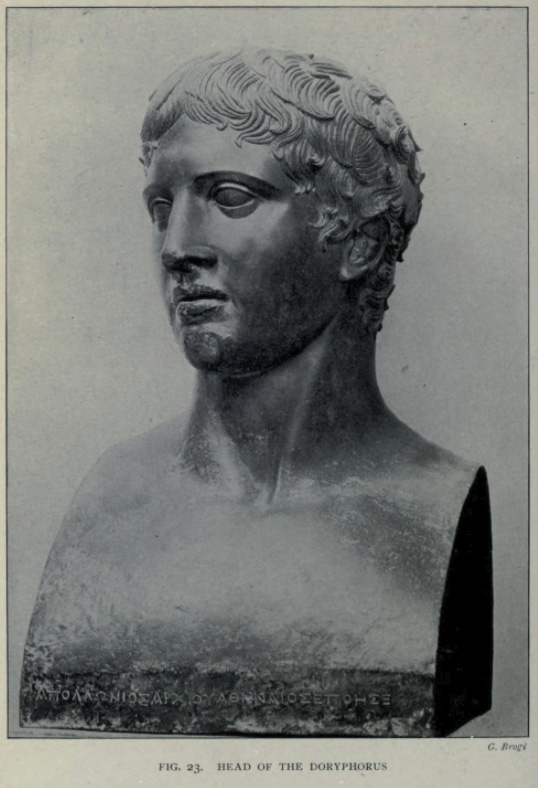

Apollonius (Ancient Greek: Άπολλώνιος), the son of Archias, was an Athenian sculptor around the 1st century.

He made the bronze head of the young hero, which was found at Herculaneum and is engraved in the Mus. Hercul. i. tab. 45. It bears the inscription, ΑΠΟΛΛΩΝΙΟΣ ΑΡΧΙΟΥ ΑΘΗΝΑΙΟΣ ΕΠΟΗΣΕ ("Apollonius son of Archias Athenian made [it]"). It is now in Naples, Museo Archeologico Nazionale, inv. 4885.

He was a member of a dynasty of sculptors and copyists that alternated between the names Apollonius and Archias. He may have been the creator of other bronzes from the Villa of the Papyri.
