= Leopold Feldmann =

German-Austrian dramatist (1802–1882)

Leopold Feldmann (22 May 1802, in Munich, Bavaria – 26 March 1882, in Vienna) was a German-Austrian dramatist.

== Biography ==
In 1835 appeared his Lays of Hell (German: Höllenlieder). Next came the comedy The Son on His Travels (German: Der Sohn auf Reisen), which made a brilliant success at Munich. After five years in travel, chiefly in Greece, as correspondent of the Allgemeine Zeitung, in 1850 he settled in Vienna for life.

== Works ==
His comedies were very popular in their day. Among them are:

- Free Choice (German: Die freie Wahl)
- Sweetheart's Portrait (German: Das Porträt der Geliebten)
- The Late Countess (German: Die selige Gräfin)
- The Comptroller and His Daughter (German: Der Rechnungsrat und seine Töchter)
