= Apollonius (ambassador) =

Apollonius (Ancient Greek: Άπολλώνιος) was the spokesman of an embassy sent by the Seleucid ruler Antiochus IV Epiphanes to Rome in 173 BCE. He brought from Antiochus tribute and rich presents, and requested that the Roman Senate would renew with Antiochus the alliance which had existed between his father Menelaus, Antiochus III the Great, and the Romans.
