= Apollonius (Seleucid) =

Man of the Seleucid Empire

Apollonius (Ancient Greek: Άπολλώνιος) was a man of the Seleucid Empire who lived in the 2nd century BCE.

Apollonius was a friend of the Seleucid ruler Demetrius I Soter when the latter was a young man. When Demetrius, at the age of 10, was sent to Rome as a hostage in 175, Apollonius went with him, and supported him with his advice. Apollonius had been educated together with Demetrius, and their two families had been long connected by friendship.

Apollonius of Tarsus, the father of Apollonius, had possessed great influence with Demetrius's father, the ruler Seleucus IV Philopator. He is mentioned in 2 Maccabees 3 as the person who informed Seleucus of the great wealth held at the temple in Jerusalem.
