= Apollonius Attaleus =

Ancient Greek writer

Apollonius Attaleus (Ancient Greek: Άπολλώνιος Ἀτταλεύς) was a man mentioned by Artemidorus as being the author of a work on dreams. We know he lived in or before the 2nd century, but nothing else.
