= Apollonius (tyrant) =

Apollonius (Ancient Greek: Άπολλώνιος) was a tyrant of a town in Mesopotamia the Greeks called Zenodotion in the 1st century BCE.

When the Roman general Marcus Licinius Crassus entered the region, no city resisted his invasion besides Zenodotion. The city allowed 100 of Crassus's soldiers to enter the town as if the town meant to surrender, but then slaughtered the soldiers. In retaliation, Crassus brought his entire army to bear on Zenodotion, captured and sacked the city, and sold its inhabitants into slavery.
