= Elizabeth Burnet =

British philanthropist and devotional writer

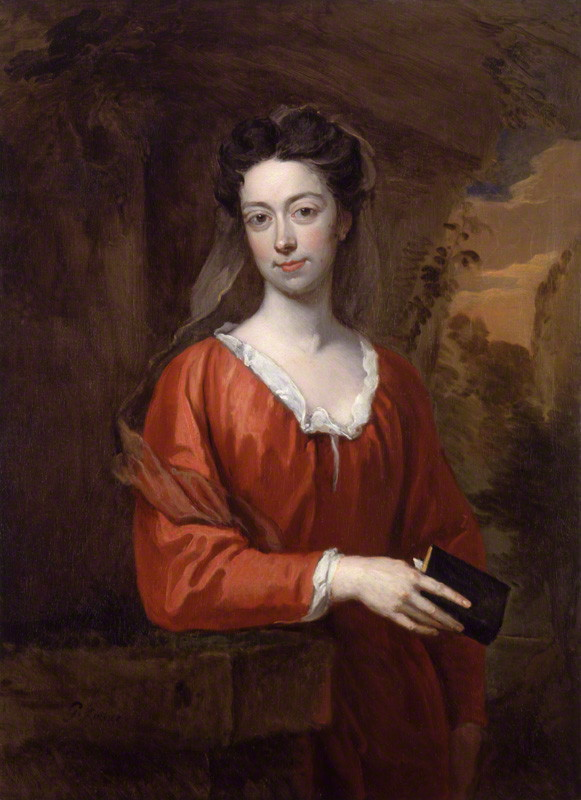
1707 portrait by Sir Godfrey Kneller.

Elizabeth Burnet (née Blake; 8 November 1661 – 3 December 1709) was an English philanthropist. Her prayer book, A Method of Devotion, went into several editions.

== Life ==
Elizabeth Blake was born near Southampton in 1661 and brought up a Puritan by her parents Sir Richard and Elizabeth Blake. Her first husband, Robert Berkeley, was the ward of her godfather John Fell, the Bishop of Oxford. After her godfather died and the Catholic James II came to the throne, she persuaded her Protestant husband to move to the Netherlands. This proved a wise move, as they would return in 1688 as part of the court of William of Orange.

Blake became known to John Locke and other religious thinkers, such as Bishop Stillingfleet. It was she who told Locke of the Defense published by Catharine Trotter Cockburn. She acted as a go-between and gave money to Cockburn before Locke also assisted her financially.

Elizabeth's first husband died in 1694 and in 1700 she married Gilbert Burnet, the Bishop of Salisbury, who had been twice widowed. His second wife Mary Scott, fearing, rightly as it turned out, that she would soon die in the smallpox epidemic then raging, advised him in the event of her death to marry Elizabeth, who was one of her closest friends. One of the reasons she married him was because she thought that he needed her advice on handling the political side of his position. The marriage proved a happy one and Elizabeth was on good terms with her five stepchildren. After her second marriage, Burnet still had control of investments that gave her an annual income of £800. She disposed of this in charitable causes, including caring for the children of the poor of Worcester and Salisbury.

Burnet travelled abroad for her health with her stepchildren, as her own two daughters had died while young. She returned to England, but the appalling cold winter of 1708–1709 caused the final decline of her health. Burnet died in London in 1709 and she was buried at Spetchley, Worcestershire.

== Prayer book and portrait ==
Near to the time of her death, the prayer book she had written after her first husband died, A Method of Devotion, was published in 1708 and went into several editions.

Burnet's portrait, painted by Sir Godfrey Kneller in 1707, is now in the National Portrait Gallery in London.
