= Asiatic style =

Ancient Greek rhetorical tendency in the 3rd century BCE

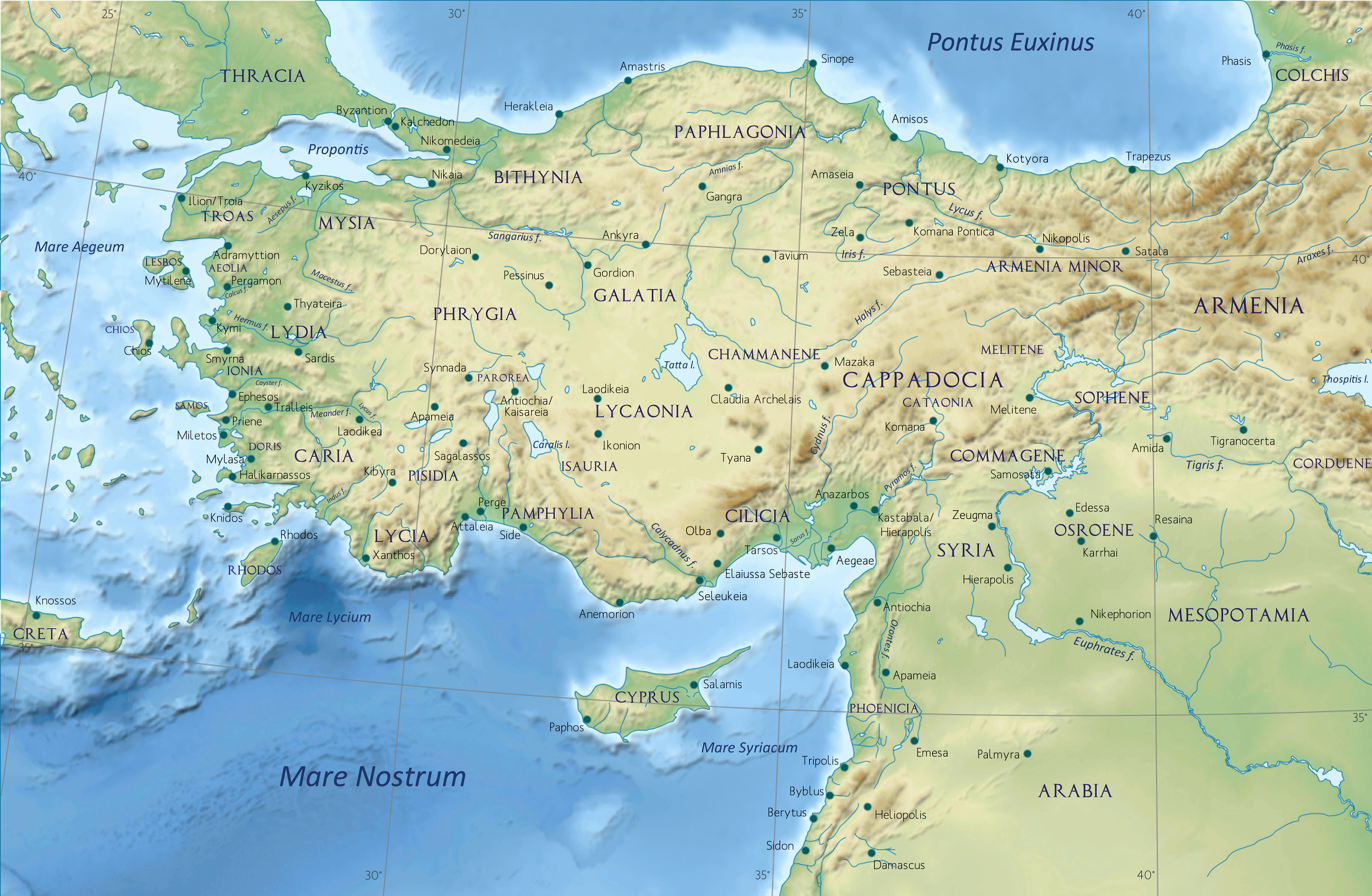
Asia Minor in the Greco-Roman period, with which the "Asiatic style" of oratory was associated

The Asiatic style or Asianism (Latin: genus orationis Asiaticum, Cicero, Brutus 325) refers to an Ancient Greek rhetorical tendency (though not an organized school) that arose in the third century BC, which, although of minimal relevance at the time, briefly became an important point of reference in later debates about Roman oratory.

== Origin ==
Hegesias of Magnesia was Asianism's first main representative and was considered its founder. Hegesias "developed and exaggerated stylistic effects harking back to the sophists and the Gorgianic style."

== Characteristics ==
Unlike the more austere, formal and traditional Attic style, Asiatic oratory was more bombastic, emotional, and coloured with wordplay.

The Asiatic style was distinguished by the use of a prose rhythm, especially the end of clauses (clausulae). This worked in much the same way as in Latin poetry, although poetic metres themselves were avoided. An effective rhythm could bring an audience to applaud the rhythm alone, however Cicero criticised Asiatic orators for their overly repetitive endings.

== Roman perspective before Cicero ==
The first known use of the term is in Rome, by Cicero in the mid-first century BC. It came into general and pejorative use for a florid style contrasting with the formal, traditional rhetoric of Atticism, which it was said to have corrupted. The term reflects an association with writers in the Greek cities of Asia Minor. "Asianism had a significant impact on Roman rhetoric, since many of the Greek teachers of rhetoric who came to Rome beginning with the 2d cent. B.C.E. were Asiatic Greeks." "Mildly Asianic tendencies" have been found in Gaius Gracchus' oratory, and "more marked" ones in Publius Sulpicius Rufus. However we have almost no remnants of oratory that can properly be called Asiatic.

Cicero (Orator ad Brutum 325) identifies two distinct modes of the Asiatic style: a more studied and symmetrical style (generally taken to mean "full of Gorgianic figures") employed by the historian Timaeus and the orators Menecles and Hierocles of Alabanda, and the rapid flow and ornate diction of Aeschines of Miletus and Aeschylus of Cnidus. Hegesias' "jerky, short clauses" may be placed in the first class, and Antiochus I of Commagene's Mount Nemrut inscription in the second. The conflation of the two styles under a single name has been taken to reflect the essentially polemical significance of the term: "The key similarity is that they are both extreme and therefore bad; otherwise they could not be more different." According to Cicero, Quintus Hortensius combined these traditions and made them at home in Latin oratory.

Cicero himself, rejecting the extreme plainness and purism of the Atticists, was attacked by critics such as Licinius Macer Calvus for being on the side of the Asiani; in response he declared his position as the "Roman Demosthenes" (noting that the preeminent Attic orator would not have qualified as Attic by the strict standards of the oratores Attici of first-century Rome). In this sense, although Cicero identified with an Attic orator, he never went so far as to completely criticise Asiatic oratory, and professed a mixed or middle style (genus medium; Quintilian 12.10.18: genus Rhodium...velut medium...atque ex utroque mixtum) between the low or plain Attic style and the high Asiatic style, called the Rhodian style by association with Molo of Rhodes and Apollonius the Effeminate (Rhodii, Cicero, Brutus xiii 51).

== Roman perspective after Cicero ==
In the Neronian period, the surviving portion of Petronius' Satyricon begins midway through a rant in which the unreliable narrator, Encolpius, denounces the corruption of Roman literary taste and the Asiatic style in particular: "that flatulent, inflated magniloquence later imported from Asia to Athens has infected every aspiring writer like a pestilential breeze" (trans. Branham and Kinney). Quintilian accepted Cicero's attitude towards Asianism and Atticism, and adapted the earlier debate's polemical language, in which objectionable style is called effeminate, in his own De causis corruptae eloquentiae.

In his Institutio Oratoria (XII.10), Quintilian diagnoses the roots of the two styles in terms of ethnic dispositions: "The Attici, refined and discriminating, tolerated nothing empty or gushing; but the Asiatic race somehow more swollen and boastful was inflated with a more vainglory of speaking" (trans. Amy Richlin). Pliny the Younger continued to profess the mixed style. The debate remained topical for Tacitus (as seen in Pliny's correspondence with him on oratorical styles in Letter 1.20) and contributes to the atmosphere of his Dialogus de oratoribus.

Ultimately, there seems to have been a general preponderance or victory of the Asiatic over the Attic style in the imperial period.
