= Apollonius of Athens =

Apollonius of Athens (Ancient Greek: Άπολλώνιος ό Άθηναίος) was a Greek sophist and rhetorician who lived in the time of the Roman emperor Septimius Severus, at the end of the 2nd century.

Apollonius was a pupil of the sophists Adrianus and Chrestus. He distinguished himself by his forensic eloquence, and taught rhetoric at Athens at the same time with Heracleides. He was an opponent of Heracleides, and with the assistance of his associates he succeeded in expelling him from the chair of rhetoric in Athens. Apollonius was afterward appointed by the emperor to the chair of rhetoric, with a salary of one talent. He held several high offices in his native place, and distinguished himself no less as a statesman and diplomatist than as a rhetorician.

Apollonius cultivated chiefly political oratory, and used to spend a great deal of time upon preparing his speeches in retirement. His declamations are said to have excelled those of many of his predecessors in dignity, beauty, and propriety; but he was often vehement and rhythmical.

Apollonius' moral conduct was censured, as he had a son Rufinus by a concubine. He died at Athens in the seventieth year of his age.
