= Apollonius (son of Sotades) =

Apollonius (Ancient Greek: Άπολλώνιος) of Athens was a son of the ribald poet Sotades. He wrote a work on the poetry of his father. He lived in the late 3rd century BC.
