= Apollonius of Sicily =

Apollonius was one of the principal leaders during the revolt of the slaves in Sicily, which had been brought about by one Titus Vettius, in 103 BCE. The Roman Senate sent Lucius Licinius Lucullus with an army against him, and by bribes and the promise of immunity he induced Apollonius to betray the other leaders of the insurrection, and to aid the Romans in suppressing it.
