= Apollonius (son of Chaeris) =

Apollonius (Ancient Greek: Άπολλώνιος), son of Chaeris, was a writer of ancient Greece, who is referred to by the scholiast on Aristophanes, and the Venetian Scholiast on Homer. He is otherwise unknown.
