= Apollonius of Syria =

Apollonius (Ancient Greek: Άπολλώνιος) was a man of ancient Syria who was a Platonic philosopher. He lived about the time of the Roman emperor Hadrian—that is, the late 1st and early 2nd century AD—and is known to have inserted into his works an oracle which promised to Hadrian the government of the Roman world.
