= Apollonius of Egypt =

Apollonius (Ancient Greek: Άπολλώνιος), a native of Egypt, was a writer who is referred to by Theophilus of Antioch as an authority respecting various opinions upon the age of the world.

Whether he is the same as the Apollonius from whom Athenaeus quotes a passage concerning the symposia of the ancient Egyptians, is uncertain. The number of persons of the name of Apollonius, who were natives of Egypt, is so great that unless some other distinguishing epithet is added, it is impossible to say who they were. An Apollonius, an Egyptian, is mentioned as a soothsayer, who prophesied the death of Caligula.
