= Apollonius von Maltitz =

German writer and diplomat

Apollonius Freiherr von Maltitz (June 11, 1795 – March 2, 1870) was a German writer and diplomat.

Von Maltitz was born in Gera. He became a diplomat in the service of the Russian Empire from 1811, representing it in various cities, mostly in Germany. He was successively attache in the Russian legations in Karlsruhe, Stuttgart, Vienna, Berlin, and Rio de Janeiro; in 1836 he became a secretary (Legationsrat and Gesandtschaftssekretär) in Munich. From 1841 until his retirement in 1865, he was the main representative of Russia in Weimar. He wrote a variety of poetry, dramas, and novels as well, some of which were well known at the time.
