= Apollonius Schotte =

Dutch statesman, jurist and poet

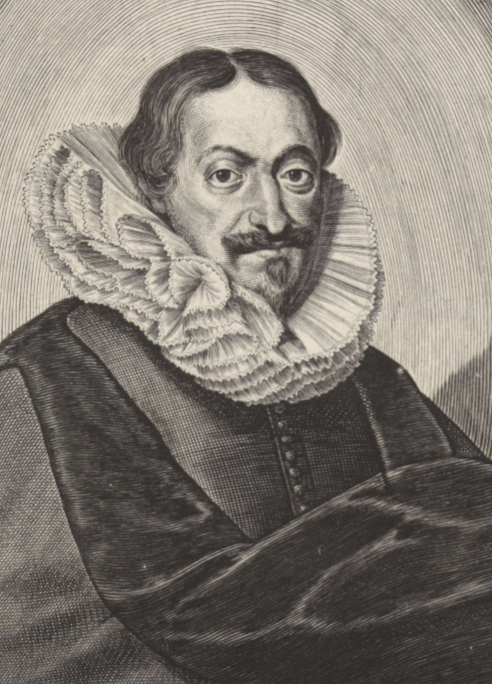
Portrait of Jacob Schotte the elder, in the Rijksmuseum.

Apollonius Schotte (c. 1579 – 1 November 1639) was a Dutch statesman, jurist and poet.

== Family ==
His father, Jacob Schotte, had served against the Spaniards in the patriot army under William the Silent. He had two brothers, Simon and Jacob, who distinguished themselves variously in Dutch scholastics and politics. He was a man of considerable wealth. His fortune passed to his granddaughter Maria, who married as his second wife Gilbert Burnet, Bishop of Salisbury, by whom she had several children. She died of smallpox in 1699 while on a visit to Rotterdam.
