= Apollonius Molon =

1st-century BC Greek rhetorician

Apollonius Molon or Molo of Rhodes (or simply Molon; Ancient Greek: Ἀπολλώνιος ὁ Μόλων), was a Greek rhetorician. He was a native of Alabanda, a pupil of Menecles, and settled at Rhodes, where he opened a school of rhetoric. Prior to that, he twice visited Rome as an ambassador from Rhodes. Marcus Tullius Cicero studied with him during his trip to Greece in 79–77 BC, as did Gaius Julius Caesar a few years later. Perhaps it is at least partially due to Apollonius Molon's instruction that Caesar, and Cicero especially, achieved fame as orators in the Roman Republic. Molon is reputed to have quoted Demosthenes in telling his pupils that the first three elements in rhetoric were "Delivery, Delivery and Delivery." He had a stellar reputation in Roman Law courts, and was even invited to address the Roman Senate in Greek – an honor not usually bestowed upon foreign ambassadors.

Molon wrote on Homer and endeavored to moderate the florid Asiatic style of rhetoric. According to Josephus, in Against Apion, Apollonius Molon slandered the Jews.
