= Apollonius the Effeminate =

Apollonius of Alabanda (also Apollonius Malakos, Appolonius Malachus) (malakos meaning 'soft', with the potential implication of 'effeminate') (Ancient Greek: Ἀπολλώνιος ὁ Μαλακός) was a Greek sophist rhetorician of Alabanda in Caria who flourished about 120 BC.

After studying under Menecles, chief of the Asiatic school of oratory, he settled in Rhodes, where he taught rhetoric. Among his pupils were Q. Mucius Scaevola the augur, and Marcus Antonius, the grandfather of Mark Antony.
