= Alexandrian school =

Scholarly tradition in ancient Egypt

The Alexandrian school is a collective designation for certain tendencies in literature, philosophy, medicine, and the sciences that developed in the Hellenistic cultural center of Alexandria, Egypt during the Hellenistic and Roman periods.

Alexandria was a remarkable center of learning due to the blending of Greek and Oriental influences, its favorable situation and commercial resources, and the enlightened energy of some of the Macedonian Dynasty of the Ptolemies ruling over Egypt, in the final centuries BC. Much scholarly work was collected in the great Library of Alexandria during this time. Large amounts of epic poetry and works on geography, history, mathematics, astronomy, philosophy, and medicine were composed in Alexandria during this period.

Alexandrian school is also used to describe the religious and philosophical developments in Alexandria after the 1st century. The mix of Jewish theology and Greek philosophy led to a syncretic mix and much mystical speculation. The Neoplatonists devoted themselves to examining the nature of the soul, and sought communion with God. The two great schools of biblical interpretation in the early Christian church incorporated Neoplatonism and philosophical beliefs from Plato's teachings into Christianity, and interpreted much of the Bible allegorically. The founders of the Alexandrian school of Christian theology were Clement of Alexandria and Origen.

== History ==
Alexandria, founded by Alexander the Great during his Egyptian campaign, was well positioned to become a center of culture and commerce. As it grew into a major seaport, it became a hub for trade and travel throughout the Mediterranean world, serving as a gateway between East and West. The natural advantages it enjoyed were increased to an enormous extent by the care of the sovereigns of Egypt. Ptolemy Soter (reigned 323–285 BC), to whom Egypt had fallen after the death of Alexander, began to subsidize Greek scholars and poets in Alexandria as part of his broader campaign to Hellenize Egypt. Under the inspiration of his friend Demetrius of Phalerum, the Athenian orator, statesman, and philosopher, Ptolemy laid the foundations of the Musaeum: a large complex which contained the Library of Alexandria. The work begun by Ptolemy Soter was carried on by his descendants, in particular by his two immediate successors, Ptolemy Philadelphus and Ptolemy Euergetes. Philadelphus (285–247), whose librarian was the celebrated Callimachus, gathered all the works of Aristotle, and also introduced a number of Jewish and native Egyptian works. Among these appears to have been a portion of the Septuagint. Euergetes (247–222) increased the library by seizing on the original editions of the dramatists from the Athenian archives, and by compelling all travelers who arrived in Alexandria to leave a copy of any work they possessed.

Despite sharing certain tendencies, there was never a definitively "Alexandrian" system of thought. The literary, scientific, and philosophical activities of Alexandrian scholars in the Hellenistic and Roman periods were highly varied; they have only in common a certain spirit or form. This intellectual "school" lasted centuries and can be split into two major periods. The first period extends from about 306 to 30 BC, the time from the foundation of the Ptolemaic dynasty to the annexation of Egypt by the Romans; the second extends from 30 BC to the destruction of the Great Library sometime before or upon the capture of Alexandria by 'Amr ibn al-'As in 641 AD.

Scholarship of the early Ptolemaic period was usually either literary or scientific. This tendency reflects the larger project of the early Ptolemies to synthesize Egyptian and Hellenic intellectual culture. By the 1st century BC, the Alexandrian school began to fracture and diversify. This was due in part to the relative weakness of the government under the later Ptolemies, but also to the rise of new scholarly circles in Rhodes, Syria and elsewhere in the eastern Mediterranean. This gradual dissolution was much increased when Alexandria fell under Roman sway.

As the influence of the school was extended over the whole Graeco-Roman world, scholars began to concentrate at Rome rather than at Alexandria. In Alexandria, however, there were new forces in operation, which produced a second great outburst of intellectual life. The new movement, which was influenced by Judaism and Christianity, resulted in the speculative philosophy of the Neoplatonists and the religious philosophy of the Gnostics and early church fathers.

== Literature ==
The forms of poetry chiefly cultivated by the Alexandrians were epic and lyric, or elegiac. Great epics are wanting; but in their place are found the historical and the didactic or expository epics. The subjects of the historical epics were generally some of the well-known myths, in which the writer could show the full extent of his learning and his perfect command of verse. These poems are valuable as repertoires of antiquities; but their style is often bad, and great patience is required to clear up their numerous and obscure allusions. The best extant specimen is the Argonautica of Apollonius of Rhodes; the most characteristic is the Alexandra or Cassandra of Lycophron, the obscurity of which is almost proverbial.

The subjects of the didactic epics were very numerous; they seem to have depended on the special knowledge possessed by the writers, who used verse as a form for unfolding their information. Some, such as the lost poem of Callimachus, were on the origin of myths and religious observances; others were on special sciences. Thus we have two poems of Aratus, who, though not resident at Alexandria, was so thoroughly imbued with the Alexandrian spirit as to be included in the school; the one is an essay on astronomy, the other an account of the signs of the weather. Nicander of Colophon has also left us two epics, one on remedies for poisons, the other on the bites of venomous beasts. Euphorion and Rhianus wrote mythological epics. The spirit of all their productions is the same, that of learned research.

Alexandrian lyric and elegiac poetry was often technical and derivative. The earliest of the elegiac poets was Philitas of Cos. but Callimachus was perhaps the most famous. Of his numerous works only a few hymns, epigrams and fragments of elegies remain extant. Other lyric poets were Phanocles, Hermesianax, Alexander of Aetolia and Lycophron.

Epigrams were popular, as well as parodies and satirical poems, which include the Silloi of Timon and the Kinaidoi of Sotades.

Dramatic poetry appears to have flourished to some extent. Extant are three or four varying lists of the seven great dramatists who composed the Alexandrian Pleiad. Their works have perished. A cruder kind of drama, the amoebaean verse, or bucolic mime, developed into the only pure stream of genial poetry found in the Alexandrian School, the Idylls of Theocritus. As the name of these poems suggests, they were pictures of fresh country life.

Alexandrian poetry had a powerful influence on Roman literature. That literature, especially in the Augustan age, can only be understood by appreciating of the character of the Alexandrian school. The historians of this period were numerous and prolific. Many of them, such as Cleitarchus, devoted themselves to the life and achievements of Alexander the Great. The best-known names are those of Timaeus and Polybius.

Before the Alexandrians had begun to produce original works, their researches were directed towards the masterpieces of ancient Greek literature. If that literature was to be a power in the world, it had to be handed down to posterity in a form capable of being understood. This was the task begun and carried out by the Alexandrian critics. These men did not merely collect works, but sought to arrange them, to subject the texts to criticism, and to explain any allusion or reference in them which at a later date might become obscure. They studied the arrangement of the texts; settlement of accents; theories of forms and syntax; explanations either of words or things; and judgments on the authors and their works, including all questions as to authenticity and integrity.

The critics required a wide range of knowledge; and from this requirement sprang grammar, prosody, lexicography, mythology and archaeology. The service rendered by these critics is invaluable. To them we owe not merely the possession of the greatest works of Greek intellect, but the possession of them in a readable state. The most celebrated critics were Zenodotus; Aristophanes of Byzantium, to whom we owe the theory of Greek accents; Crates of Mallus; and Aristarchus of Samothrace, the coryphaeus of criticism. Others were Lycophron, Callimachus, Eratosthenes and many of a later age, for the critical school long survived the literary. Dionysius Thrax, the author of the first scientific Greek grammar, may also be mentioned. These philological labours were of great indirect importance, for they led to the study of the natural sciences, and in particular to a more accurate knowledge of geography and history. Considerable attention began to be paid to the ancient history of Greece, and to all the myths relating to the foundation of states and cities. A large collection of such curious information is contained in the Bibliotheca (Pseudo-Apollodorus). Eratosthenes was the first to write on physical geography; he also first attempted to draw up a chronological table of the Egyptian kings and of the historical events of Greece. The sciences of mathematics, astronomy and medicine were also cultivated with assiduity and success at Alexandria, but they did not have their origin there, and did not, in any strict sense, form part of the peculiarly Alexandrian literature. The founder of the mathematical school was the celebrated Euclid; among its scholars were Archimedes; Apollonius of Perga, author of a treatise on Conic Sections; Eratosthenes, to whom we owe the first measurement of the earth; and Hipparchus, the founder of the epicyclical theory of the heavens, afterwards called the Ptolemaic system, from its most famous expositor, Claudius Ptolemy. Alexandria continued to be celebrated as a school of mathematics and science long after the Christian era.

== Philosophy ==
After the Roman conquest, pure literature bears the stamp of Rome rather than of Alexandria. But in Alexandria for some time there had been various forces working, and these, coming in contact with great spiritual changes in the world, produced a second outburst of intellectual activity, which is generally known as the Alexandrian school of philosophy.

The doctrines of this school were a fusion of Eastern and Western thought, typically combining in varying proportions elements of Hellenistic and Jewish philosophy, but also in the case of Pyrrhonism elements of Buddhism that had been brought back from India by the ancient Greek philosopher Pyrrho of Elis and of which the Alexandrian school philosopher Aenesidemus (c. first century BC) was particularly influential. The Stromata of Clement of Alexandria contains the earliest surviving mention of the Buddha in Western literature.

The city of Alexandria had gradually become the neutral ground of Europe, Asia and Africa. Its population, then as at the present day, was a heterogeneous collection of all races. Alexander had planted a colony of Jews who had increased in number until at the beginning of the Christian era they occupied two-fifths of the city and held some of the highest offices. The contact of Jewish theology with Greek speculation became the great problem of thought. The Jewish ideas of divine authority and their transcendental theories of conduct were peculiarly attractive to the Greek thinkers who found no inspiration in the dry intellectualism of Hellenistic philosophy. At the same time the Jews had to some extent shaken off their exclusiveness and were prepared to compare and contrast their old theology with cosmopolitan culture. Thus the Hellenistic doctrine of personal revelation could be combined with the Jewish tradition of a complete theology revealed to a special people. The result was the application of a purely philosophical system to the somewhat vague and unorganized corpus of Jewish theology. According to the relative predominance of these two elements arose Gnosticism, the Patristic theology, and the philosophical schools of Neopythagoreanism and Neoplatonism.

The first concrete exemplification of this is found in Aristobulus (c. 160 BC). So far as the Jews are concerned, the great name is that of Philo in the 1st century. He took Greek metaphysical theories, and, by the allegorical method, interpreted them in accordance with the Jewish Revelation. He dealt with (a) human life as explained by the relative nature of Humanity to God, (b) the Divine nature and the existence of God, and, (c) the great Logos doctrine as the explanation of the relation between God and the material universe. From these three arguments he developed a syncretism of oriental mysticism and pure Greek metaphysics.

The first pure philosophy of the Alexandrian school was Neopythagoreanism, the second and last Neoplatonism. Their doctrines were a synthesis of Platonism, Stoicism and the later Aristotelianism with a dose of oriental mysticism which gradually became more and more important. The world to which they spoke had begun to demand a doctrine of salvation to satisfy the human soul. They endeavoured to deal with the problem of good and evil. They therefore devoted themselves to examining the nature of the soul, and taught that its freedom consists in communion with God, to be achieved by absorption in a sort of ecstatic trance. This doctrine reached its height with Plotinus; later followers emphasized theurgy in its unsuccessful combat with Christianity. Finally this pagan theosophy was driven from Alexandria back to Athens under Plutarch of Athens and Proclus, and occupied itself largely in commentaries based mainly on the attempt to re-organize ancient philosophy in conformity with the system of Plotinus. This school ended under Damascius when Justinian closed the Athenian schools (529).

Neoplatonism had a considerable effect on certain Christian thinkers at the beginning of the 3rd century. Among these the most important were Clement of Alexandria and Origen. Clement, as a scholar and a theologian, proposed to unite the mysticism of Neoplatonism with the practical spirit of Christianity. He combined the principle of pure living with that of free thinking, and held that instruction must regard the mental capacity of the hearer. The compatibility of Christian and later Neoplatonic ideas is evidenced by the writings of Synesius, bishop of Ptolemais, and though Neoplatonism eventually succumbed to Christianity.

== Medicine ==
The two first great anatomists, Herophilus and Erasistratus, practiced in Alexandria.

== See also ==
- Antiochian school
- Heracleon
- Buddhism and the Roman world
