= Philitas of Cos =

Ancient Greek scholar and poet

- Φιλίτας ὁ Κῷος
- Born: c. 340 BC
- Died: c. 285 BC (age 55)
- Occupations: Scholar and poet
- Writing career
- Genres: Elegiac, epigram, epyllion
- Subjects: Glossary, Homer
- Notable works: Demeter; Disorderly Words
- Literary movement: Alexandrian school of poetry

Philitas of Cos (/fɪˈlaɪtəs/; Greek: Φιλίτας ὁ Κῷος, Philitas ho Kōos; c. 340 – c. 285 BC), sometimes spelled Philetas (/faɪˈliːtəs/; Φιλήτας, Philētas; see Bibliography below), was a Greek scholar, poet and grammarian during the early Hellenistic period of ancient Greece. He is regarded as the founder of the Hellenistic school of poetry, which flourished in Alexandria after about 323 BC. Philitas is also reputed to have been the tutor of Ptolemy II Philadelphus and the poet Theocritus. He was thin and frail; Athenaeus later caricatured him as an academic so consumed by his studies that he wasted away and died.

Philitas was the first major Greek writer who was both a scholar and a poet. His reputation continued for centuries, based on both his pioneering study of words and his verse in elegiac meter. His vocabulary Disorderly Words described the meanings of rare literary words, including those used by Homer. His poetry, notably his elegiac poem Demeter, was highly respected by later ancient poets. However, almost all his work has since been lost.

== Life ==
Little is known of Philitas' life. Ancient sources refer to him as a Coan, a native or long-time inhabitant of Cos, one of the Dodecanese islands in the Aegean Sea just off the coast of Asia. His student Theocritus wrote that Philetas' father was Telephos (Τήλεφος, Tḗlephos) and his mother, assuming the manuscript is supplemented correctly, Euctione (Εὐκτιόνη, Euktiónē). From a comment about Philitas in the Suda, a 10th-century AD historical encyclopedia, it is estimated he was born c. 340 BC, and that he might have established a reputation in Cos by c. 309/8 BC. During the Wars of the Diadochi that followed the death of Alexander the Great and divided Alexander's empire, Ptolemy had captured Cos from his rival successor, Antigonus, in 310 BC; his son, Ptolemy II Philadelphus, was born there in 308 BC. It was a favorite retreat for men of letters weary of Alexandria.

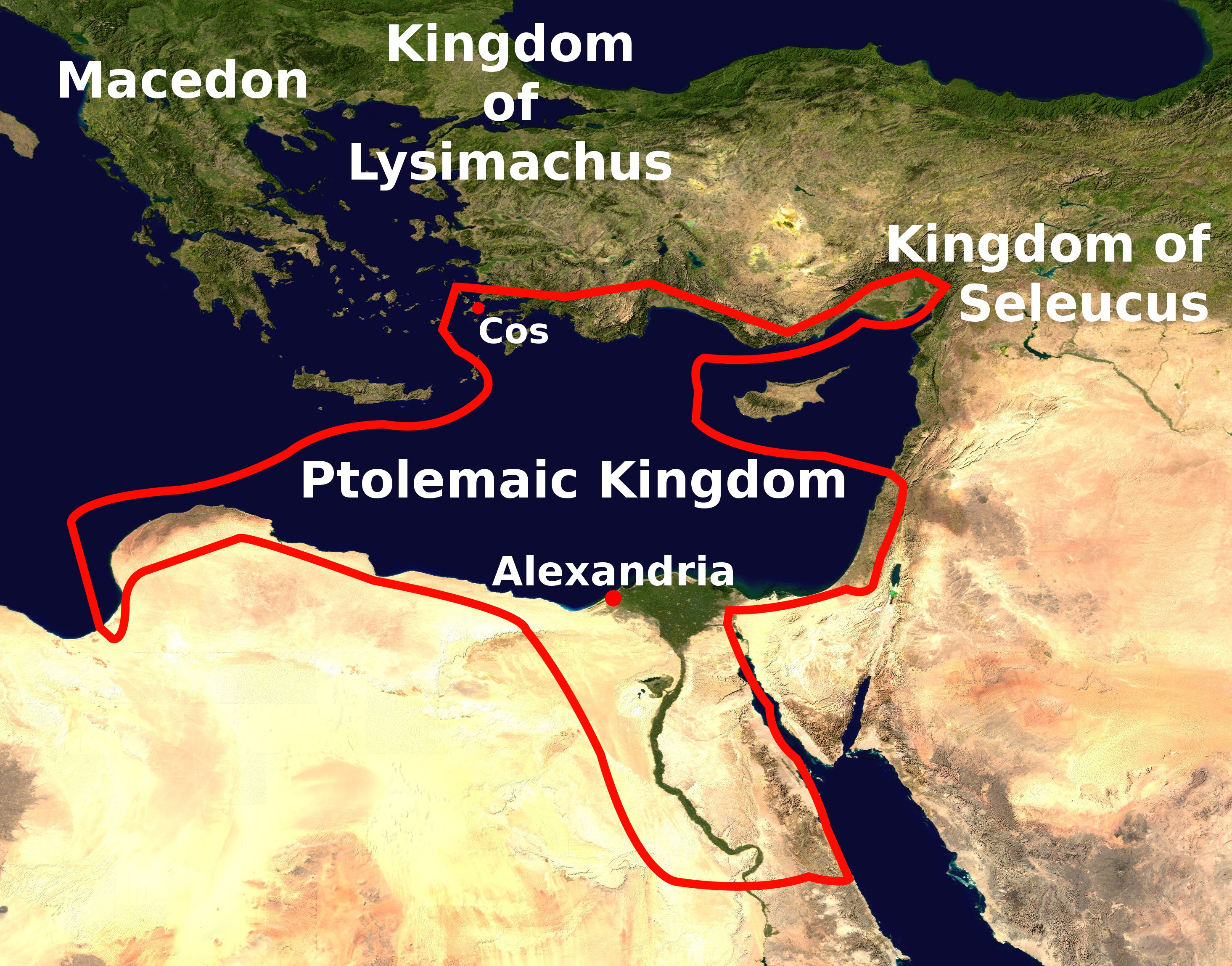
The Ptolemaic Kingdom, c. 300 BC, was centered on Alexandria in ancient Egypt; Cos was on its northwest frontier.

Philetas was appointed Philadelphus' tutor, which suggests he moved to Alexandria c. 297/6 BC and moved back to Cos in the later 290s BC. He may also have tutored Arsinoe II, Philadelphus' older sister and eventual wife. Later tutors of royal offspring in Ptolemaic Egypt generally headed the Library of Alexandria, but it is unknown whether Philitas held that position. Philitas also taught the poets Hermesianax and Theocritus and the grammarian Zenodotus, and after he returned to Cos he seems to have spent at least ten years leading a brotherhood of intellectuals and poets that included Aratus, Hermesianax, and Theocritus.

Hermesianax wrote of "Philitas, singing of nimble Bittis", and Ovid twice calls her "Battis". It is commonly thought that Bittis or Battis was Philitas' mistress, and that Hermesianax referred to love poetry; another possibility is that her name connoted "chatterbox", and that she was a humorous personification of Philitas' passion for words.

Philitas was thin and frail, and may have suffered and died from a wasting disease. He seems to have died in Cos sometime in the 280s BC. His pupil Hermesianax wrote that a statue of him was erected under a plane tree by the people of Cos, depicting him as "frail with all the glosses". His contemporary Posidippus wrote that Philadelphus commissioned a bronze of Philitas in old age from the sculptor Hecataeus, which "included nothing from the physique of heroes. No, ... he cast the old man full of cares." The 3rd century AD Roman author Aelian skeptically passed along a story that Philitas was so thin that he put lead weights in the soles of his shoes to avoid being blown away by a stiff wind. A 2nd century AD Greek author, Athenaeus of Naucratis, wrote that Philitas studied false arguments and erroneous word-usage so intensely that he wasted away and starved to death, and that his epitaph read:

| Original | Transliterated |
|---|---|
| ξεῖνε, Φιλίτας εἰμί· λόγων ὁ ψευδόμενός με ὥλεσε καὶ νυκτῶν φροντίδες ἑσπέριοι | Xeîne, Philítas eimí. Lógōn ho pseudómenós me hṓlese kaì nyktôn phrontídes hespérioi |

St. George Stock analyzed the story as saying Philitas studied the Megarian school of philosophy, which cultivated and studied paradoxes such as the liar paradox: if someone says "I am lying", is what he says true or false? Stock wrote that Philitas worried so much over the liar paradox that he died of insomnia, and translated the epitaph as follows:

Philetas of Cos am I,
'Twas the Liar who made me die,
And the bad nights caused thereby.

A more literal translation suggests that the invented epitaph pokes fun at Philitas' focus on using the right words:

Stranger, I am Philitas. The lying word and nights' evening cares destroyed me.

== Works ==
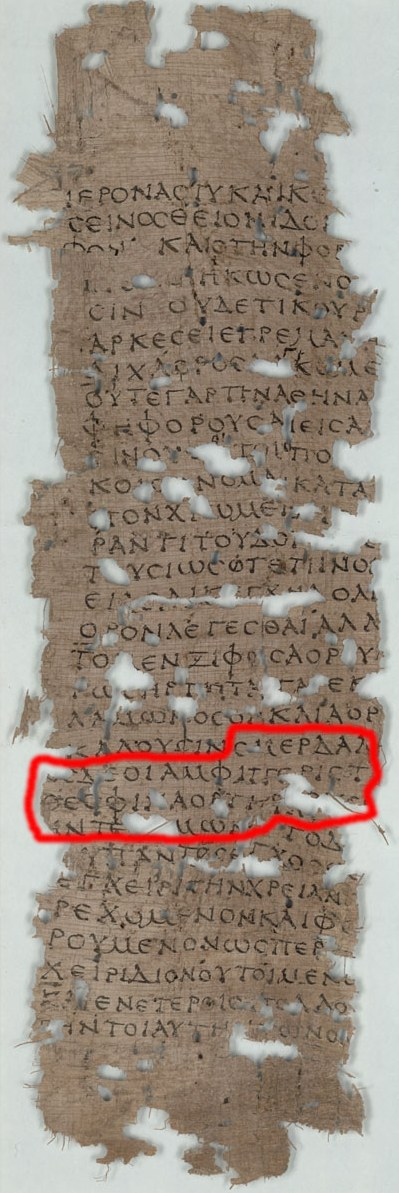
A 2nd century AD papyrus fragment, written in Greek, copies part of Apollodorus' 2nd century BC mythography On the Gods, which quotes Philitas' Demeter (outlined in red) while discussing the etymology of the word ἌΟΡ (aor; "sword" or "spear").

Philitas wrote a vocabulary explaining the meanings of rare literary words, words from local dialects, and technical terms; it probably took the form of a lexicon. The vocabulary, called Disorderly Words (Ἄτακτοι γλῶσσαι, Átaktoi glôssai), has been lost, with only a few fragments quoted by later authors. One example, quoted in Athenaeus, is that the word πέλλα (pélla) meant "wine cup" in the ancient Greek region of Boeotia; this was evidently contrasted to the same word meaning "milk pail" in Homer's Iliad. Hermeneia, another scholarly work, probably contained Philitas' versions and critical interpretations of Homer and other authors.

About thirty fragments of Philitas' poetry are known, along with four definite titles:

- Demeter, Philitas' most famous work, consisted of elegiac couplets, or couplets in the elegiac meter. Its few surviving fragments suggest that it narrated the grain goddess Demeter's hunt for her daughter Persephone. The fragments describe Demeter's arrival on Cos and warm welcome by its royal family of Meropids, or humans twice normal size, thus presenting the founding myth of a local cult of Demeter on Cos.
- Hermes was an epyllion, or brief mythological narrative, written in hexameter. It had the structure of a hymn, with a central narrative telling of Odysseus' visit to the island of the king Aeolus, keeper of the winds, and of Odysseus' secret affair with the king's daughter Polymele. It is also possible that Hermes was a collection of such stories, with the patronage of Hermes himself as the common thread.
- Playthings (Παίγνια, Paígnia) had two shorter collections. These poems had the structure of epigrams and their themes may have included erotica. The only surviving poem contains two elegiac couplets and has a puzzle or riddle structure characteristic of some ancient Greek drinking-party songs.
- Only one of the Epigrams has been fully reconstructed.

Another possible poem is Telephus, which may have been a companion to Demeter.

At most fifty verses of Philitas survive. Below is an example fragment of two verses, which was quoted in the Collection of Paradoxical Stories, whose putative author Antigonus (often identified with Antigonus of Carystus, a near-contemporary) does not specify which work they came from; indirect evidence suggests Demeter. These two verses show the confluence of Philitas' interests in poetry and obscure words:

| Original | Transliterated |
|---|---|
| γηρύσαιτο δὲ νεβρὸς ἀπὸ ζωὴν ὀλέσασα ὀξείης κάκτου τύμμα φυλαξαμένη | Gērýsaito dè nebròs apò zōḕn olésasa oxeíēs káktou týmma phylaxaménē |

The fawn can sing when it has lost its life,
having avoided the prick of the sharp cactus.

According to Antigonus, the "cactus" (κάκτος, káktos) was a thorny plant from Sicily, and "When a deer steps on it and is pricked, its bones remain soundless and unusable for flutes. For that reason Philitas spoke of it." Antigonus quotes one more passage, and the 5th century AD anthologist Stobaeus quotes eleven passages from Philitas; the remaining fragments are derived from ancient commentators who quoted Philitas when discussing rare words or names used by other authors.

== Influence ==
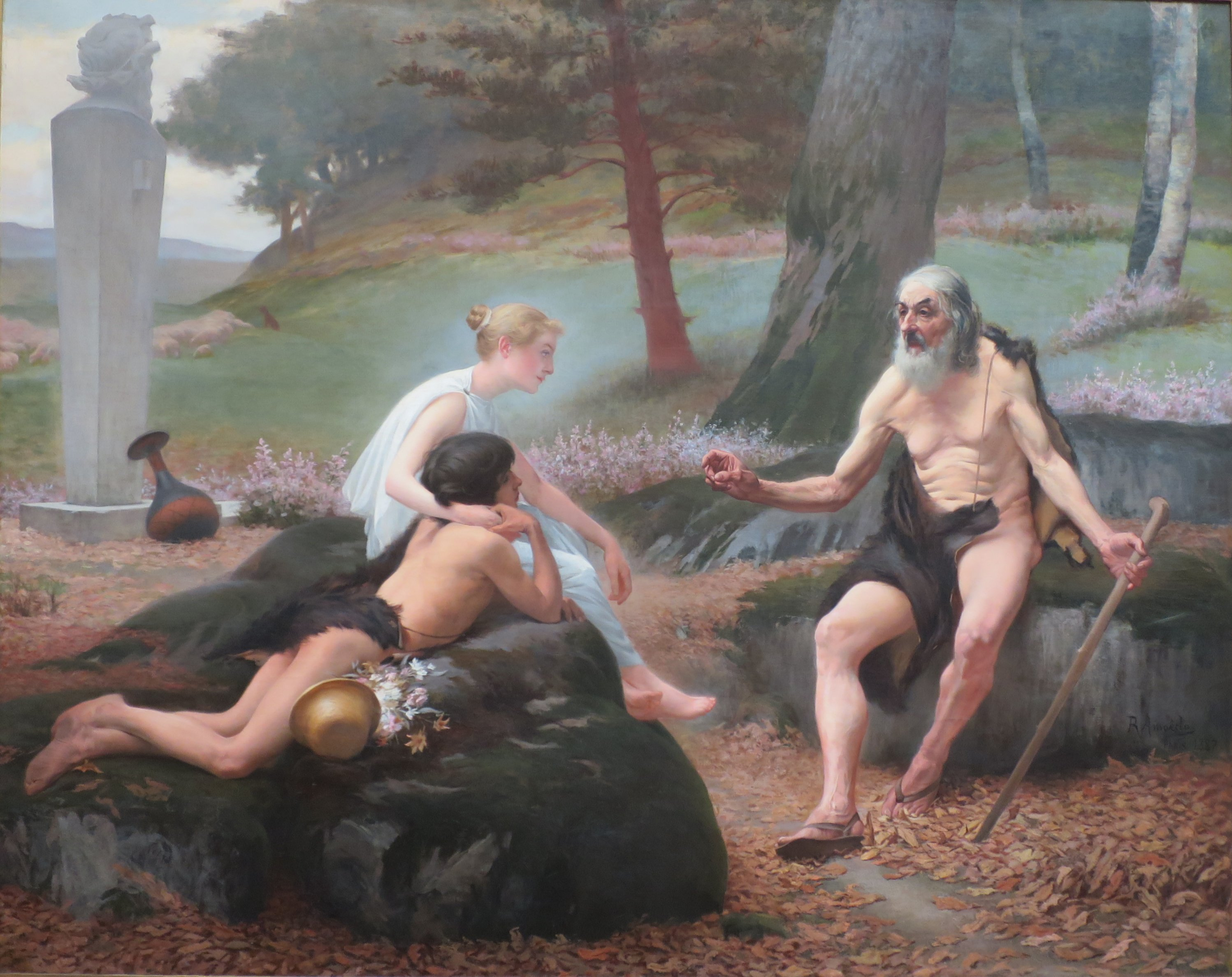
The Narrative of Philetas by Rodolfo Amoedo, 1887

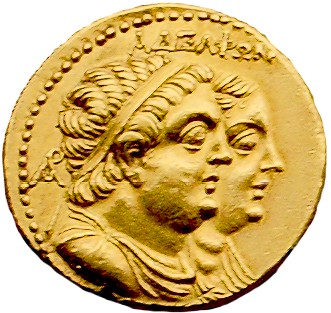
A 3rd century BC coin depicts the co-rulers of Ptolemaic Egypt: Ptolemy II Philadelphus (left), patron and ex-pupil of Philitas; and Philadelphus' sister and wife Arsinoe II, possibly also an ex-pupil.

Philitas was the most important intellectual figure in the early years of Hellenistic civilization. He gained instant recognition in both poetry and literary scholarship, and, as far as is known, was the first person called "poet as well as scholar" (ποιητὴς ἅμα καὶ κριτικός, poiētḕs [h]áma kaì kritikós). As tutor to Philadelphus he is assumed to have had great influence on the development of the Mouseion at Alexandria, a scholarly institution that included the famous Library of Alexandria. A statue was erected of him, possibly at a Mouseion at Cos, and his work was explicitly acknowledged as a classic by both Theocritus and Callimachus.

His reputation for scholarship endured for at least a century. In Athens, the comic playwright Strato made jokes that assumed audiences knew about Philitas' vocabulary, and the vocabulary was criticized more than a century later by the influential Homeric scholar Aristarchus of Samothrace in his Against Philitas (Πρὸς Φιλίταν, Pròs Philítan). The geographer Strabo described him three centuries later as "simultaneously a poet and a critic".

Philitas was the first writer whose works represent the combination of qualities now regarded as Hellenistic: variety, scholarship, and use of Homeric sources in non-epic works. He directly influenced the major Hellenistic poets Callimachus and Apollonius of Rhodes. His poetry was mentioned or briefly quoted by Callimachus and by other ancient authors, and his poetic reputation endured for at least three centuries, as Augustan poets identified his name with great elegiac writing. Propertius linked him to Callimachus with the following well-known couplet:

Callimachi Manes et Coi sacra Philetae,
in vestrum, quaeso, me sinite ire nemus.

Translation:

Shade of Callimachus and shrine of Coan Philitas,
allow me, I beg you, to walk into your grove.

Ovid also linked the two poets, urging women who wished to capture a man to read Callimachus and Philitas, and conversely advising people wishing to fall out of love to avoid these two. The 1st-century AD rhetorician Quintilian ranked Philitas second only to Callimachus among the elegiac poets. Philitas' influence has been found or suspected in a wide range of ancient writing; Longus' 2nd century AD novel Daphnis and Chloe contains a character likely named after him. Almost all that he wrote seems to have disappeared within two centuries, though, so it is unlikely that any writer later than the 2nd century BC read any but a few of his lines.

== Portrait ==
In 1770, a small marble bust (height 33 cm), dating from the middle of the 2nd century AD, was discovered in Crest. It is thought to be the Roman copy of a bronze from the 3rd century BC, now lost. In the 19th century, this bust was part of the collection of the painter Pierre Gustave Girardon. To date, it is the only known portrait of the poet. It is now preserved in the Louvre Museum, Paris. The connection between the portrait discovered in Crest and the description by Posidippus of Pella of the portrait of Philitas of Cos by the sculptor Hecataeus was made by Évelyne Prioux.

== Bibliography ==
Ancient sources spell his name in different ways. The correct form Φιλίτας (Philítas) is ancient and was common in Cos but the Doric Greek color Φιλήτας (Philḗtas) is also ancient; the accentuation Φιλητᾶς (Philētâs) did not exist before Imperial times.

—

Philitas' fragments were edited by Spanoudakis with commentary in English:

- Konstantinos Spanoudakis (2002). Philitas of Cos. Mnemosyne, Supplements, 229. Leiden: Brill. ISBN 90-04-12428-4. Reviewed by Hopkinson and by Sens.

and also by Dettori (for vocabulary) and by Sbardella (for poetry) with commentary in Italian:

- Emanuele Dettori (2000). Filita grammatico: Testimonianze e frammenti: introduzione, edizione e commento (in Italian). Rome: Quasar. ISBN 88-7140-185-9.
- Livio Sbardella (2000). Filita: Testimonianze e frammenti poetici: introduzione, edizione e commento (in Italian). Rome: Quasar. ISBN 88-7140-182-4.

Earlier editions of the fragments include Kayser, Bach, Nowacki, and Kuchenmüller; see also Maass.

- Évelyne Prioux, «Le Portrait Perdu et Retrouvé Du Poète Philitas de Cos: Posidippe 63 A.-B. et IG XIV, 2486», Zeitschrift für Papyrologie Und Epigraphik, vol. 166, 2008, p. 66–72.
- Évelyne Prioux, «Le portrait perdu et retrouvé du poète Philitas de Cos», Bulletin de la Société française d’études épigraphiques sur Rome et le monde romain. Année 2009, dans Cahiers du Centre Gustave Glotz, 2009, tome 20, p. 372-374 (lire en ligne).
