= Alexandrine grammarians =

Scholars from Hellenistic Alexandria

The Alexandrine grammarians were philologists and textual scholars who flourished in Hellenistic Alexandria in the 3rd and 2nd centuries BCE, when that city was the center of Hellenistic culture. Despite the name, the work of the Alexandrine grammarians was never confined to grammar, and in fact did not include it, since grammar in the modern sense did not exist until the first century BCE. In Hellenistic and later times, grammarian refers primarily to scholars concerned with the restoration, proper reading, explanation and interpretation of the classical texts, including literary criticism. However unlike Atticism, their goal was not to reform the Greek in their day.

The Alexandrine grammarians undertook the critical revision of the works of classical Greek literature, particularly those of Homer, and their studies were profoundly influential, marking the beginning of the Western grammatical tradition. From the beginning, a typical custom, and methodological bias of this tradition was to focus their commentary and analysis on de-contextualized sentences.

== Notable members ==
Important members of the Alexandrian grammarians included:

- Zenodotus of Ephesus (fl. c. 280 BCE): First superintendent of the Library of Alexandria and editor of Homer.
- Callimachus (fl. c. 260 BCE): Poet, critic, and scholar who cataloged the Library.
- Aristophanes of Byzantium (c. 257 BCE – c. 185 BCE): Editor of Homer and inventor of the polytonic orthography of classical Greek.
- Aristarchus of Samothrace (c. 220 – c. 143 BCE): Responsible for the most important critical edition of the Homeric poems.
- Dionysius Thrax (170 BCE – 90 BCE): Homeric scholar and student of Aristarchus, who did author a Greek grammar, although it did not discuss syntax.
- Didymus Chalcenterus: (c. 63 BCE – 10 CE): Commentator on lyric and comic poets, who compiled and transmitted the work of his predecessors.
