= Mouseion =

Hellenistic educational and philosophical institution

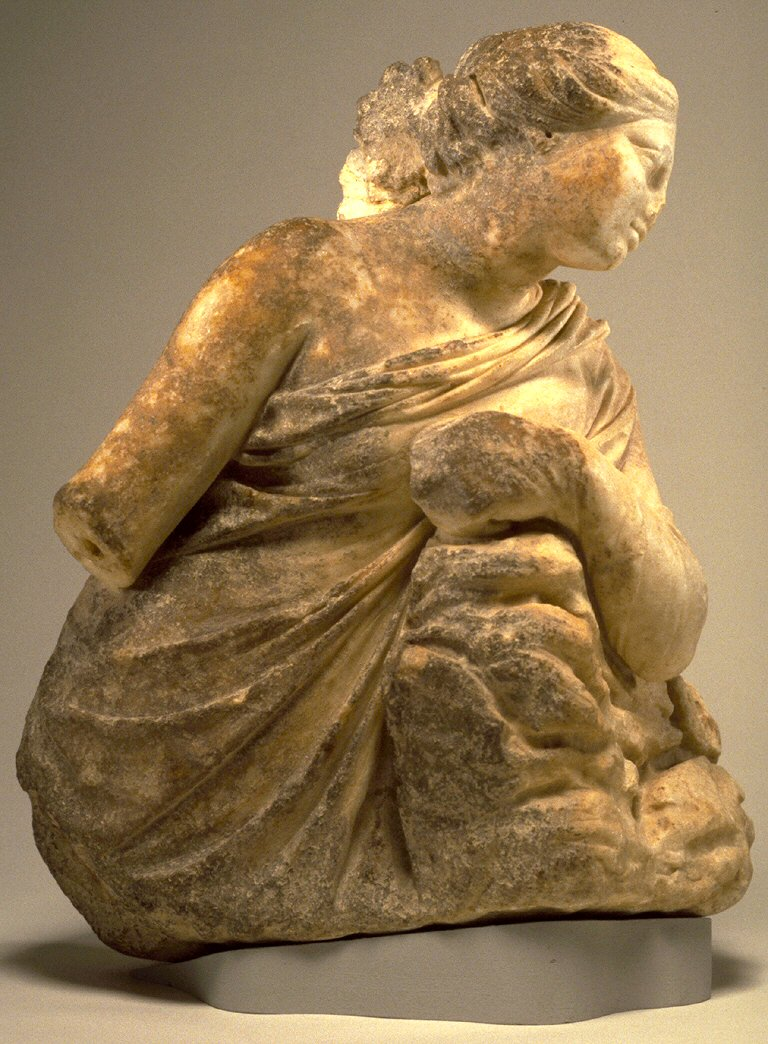
Muse statue, a common scholarly motif in the Hellenistic age.

The Mouseion of Alexandria (Ancient Greek: Μουσεῖον τῆς Ἀλεξανδρείας; Latin: Musaeum Alexandrinum), which arguably included the Library of Alexandria, was an institution said to have been founded by Ptolemy I Soter and his son Ptolemy II Philadelphus. Originally, the word mouseion meant any place that was dedicated to the Muses, often related to the study of music or poetry, but later associated with sites of learning such as Plato's Academy and Aristotle's Lyceum.

The Ptolemies reputedly established their Mouseion and Library with the intention of bringing together some of the best scholars of the Hellenistic world and to collect all the books known at the time. Although it did not imply a collection of works of art, the word mouseion is the root for the modern usage of the word museum.

== History ==
According to Johannes Tzetzes, the Mouseion was an institution founded by Ptolemy I Soter (c. 367 BC – c. 283 BC) in Alexandria, Egypt, though it is more likely that it took shape under Ptolemy II Philadelphus (309–246 BC). As a community gathered together under the protection of the Muses, the Mouseion remained supported over the centuries by the patronage of the royal family of the Ptolemies, and later by that of the Roman emperors.

Unlike the modern museum in the sense that has developed since the Renaissance, the Mouseion of Alexandria did not have a collection of sculpture and painting presented as works of art, as was assembled by the Ptolemies' rival Attalus at the Library of Pergamum. Instead, it was an institution of learning that attracted some of the best scholars of the Hellenistic world, as Germain Bazin puts it, "analogous to the modern Institute for Advanced Study in Princeton or to the Collège de France in Paris."

It is uncertain how many scholars lived in the Mouseion at any given time, as surviving reports are few and rather brief. Nonetheless, it appears that scholars and staff members were salaried by the State and paid no taxes. According to Strabo, they also received free room and board, and free servants.

Based on extant works of scholars associated with the Mouseion, it seems likely that literary criticism and other similar activities took place there. In addition to Greek works, some foreign texts were translated from Egyptian, Assyrian, Persian, Jewish, and other languages. Many of the edited versions of the Greek canon that we know today, from Homer and Hesiod forward, exist in editions that were collated and corrected by scholars presumably affiliated with the Mouseion and the Library of Alexandria.

=== Appearance ===
A map of Alexandria at the time of the Ptolemies.

In the first century AD, the Greek geographer Strabo described the Mouseion as part of a bigger, richly decorated campus of buildings and gardens:

The Mouseion is also part of the Brucheion (palace complex), possessing a peripatos (lobby), an exedra (columned hall), and large oikos (dining hall), in which the common table of the philologoi, men who are members of the Mouseion, is located. This synodos (assembly) has property in common and a priest in charge of the Mouseion, formerly appointed by the kings, but now by Caesar.

According to this description, the Mouseion featured a roofed walkway, an arcade of seats, and a communal dining room where scholars routinely ate and shared ideas. The building may have also hosted private study rooms, residential quarters, and lecture halls, based on similar structures that were built much later in Alexandria. However, it is unclear if the premises provided accommodations for anatomical research or astronomical observations. At a later date another smaller library was housed in the nearby Serapeum (Temple of Serapis), which may have been open to people other than Mouseion scholars.

=== Decline ===
During the reign of Ptolemy VIII Euergetes II, at a time of territorial losses and political turmoil in Egypt, most intellectuals were either killed or expelled from the city, including the last recorded head librarian of the Library of Alexandria, Aristarchus of Samothrace, who supposedly was forced to resign his position in 145 BC and died in exile a few years later. Johannes Tzetzes and other Byzantine sources do not mention any further directors after him, albeit four obscure 'caretakers' are mentioned in an Oxyrhynchus fragment, and an inscription from the 80s BC speaks of a certain Onesander of Paphos being appointed to the Library. There are reports that, during the Siege of Alexandria in 47 BC, parts of the library collection caught fire and were destroyed.

Despite the fact that the Mouseion continued as an institution under Roman rule, it never regained its former glory. Membership of the Mouseion was not limited to prominent scholars under the Roman emperors but included politicians, athletes, and other people rewarded for their support to the state. Emperor Claudius added an additional building in the first century AD, and much later the emperor Caracalla temporarily suspended Mouseion membership in 216 AD.

=== Destruction ===
The last known references to the old Mouseion still functioning occur in the 260s AD. The Brucheion, the complex of palaces and gardens that included the Mouseion, was probably destroyed by fire on the orders of Emperor Aurelian in 272 AD, although it is not known with certainty how much of the original buildings existed at the time. Scattered references in later sources suggest that another comparable institution was established in the 4th century at a different location, but little is known about its organisation and it is unlikely to have had the resources of its predecessor. The mathematician Theon of Alexandria (ca. 335 – ca. 405), father of the philosopher Hypatia, is described in the 10th century Suda as "the man from the Mouseion," but it is not clear what connection he actually had with it. Zacharias Rhetor and Aeneas of Gaza both speak of a physical space known as the "Mouseion" in the late 5th century.

== Legacy ==
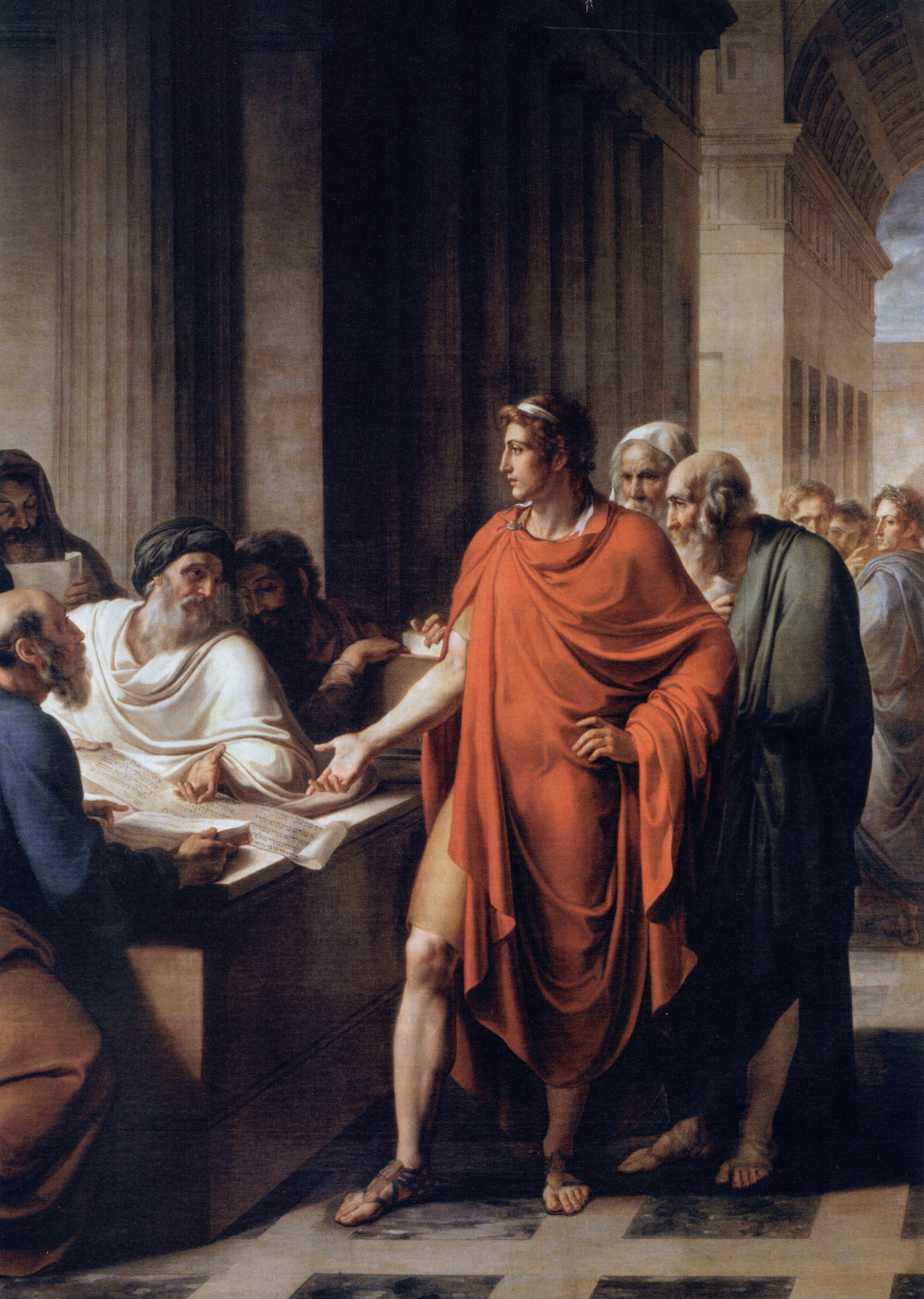
Ptolemy Philadelphus in the Library of Alexandria by Vincenzo Camuccini (1813).

The Ptolemies founded the original Mouseion at a time of transition in Greek history, during the passage from a predominantly oral to a more literary culture. The scholars gathered there included:

- Callimachus, a poet and the first to publish a comprehensive book catalogue (the Pinakes).
- Zenodotos, the first head librarian of the Library of Alexandria, who laid the foundations for Homeric philology.
- Apollonius of Rhodes, epic poet and author of the ground-breaking Argonautica.
- Eratosthenes of Cyrene, head librarian under Ptolemy III Euergetes and a polymath, who worked on literary criticism, philosophy, geography, and mathematics (e.g., his sieve for prime numbers and his measure of the Earth's circumference).
- Aristarchus of Samothrace, arguably the greatest grammarian of antiquity, who invented conventional signs nowadays used in critical editions.
- Didymos of Alexandria, known as βιβλιολάθας ("Book-Forgetting"), who reportedly composed more than 4,000 commentaries on classical authors.

The members of the Mouseion ensured the preservation and production of historical, literary, and scientific works, which would remain part of the Western heritage for centuries, and thanks to their efforts today one can still read Homer and the tragedians.

As an institution dedicated to the Muses, the word mouseion became the source for the modern word museum. In early modern France, it denoted as much a community of scholars brought together under one roof as it did the collections themselves. French and English writers often referred to these collections originally as a "cabinet of curiosities." A catalogue of the 17th century collection of John Tradescant the Elder and his son John Tradescant the Younger was the founding core of the Ashmolean Museum in Oxford. It was published as Musaeum Tradescantianum: or, a Collection of Rarities. Preserved at South-Lambeth near London by John Tradescant (1656).
