= Callistratus (grammarian) =

Callistratus, Alexandrine grammarian, flourished at the beginning of the 2nd century BC. He was one of the pupils of Aristophanes of Byzantium, who were distinctively called Aristophanei. Callistratus chiefly devoted himself to the elucidation of the Greek poets; a few fragments of his commentaries have been preserved in the various collections of scholia and in Athenaeus. He was also the author of a miscellaneous work called Summikta (Σύμμικτα), used by the later lexicographers, and of a treatise on courtesans (Athenaeus iii.125b, xiii.591d).

== Bibliography ==
- H.-L. Barth, Die Fragmente aus den Schriften der Grammatikers Kallistratos zu Homers Ilias und Odyssee (1984)
- C.W. Müller, Fragmenta Historicorum Graecorum, iv p. 353 note
- R. Pfeiffer, History of Classical Scholarship: from the Beginnings to the End of the Hellenistic Age (1968), p. 190
- R. Schmidt, De Callistrato Aristophaneo, appended to A. Nauck's Aristophanis Byzantii Fragmenta (1848)
