= Galaton =

Ancient Greek painter

Galaton (Ancient Greek: Γαλάτων) was an ancient Greek painter, whose picture representing Homer vomiting with other poets gathering up the vomit, is mentioned by Aelian ( V. H. xiii. 22) and by a scholiast to Lucian (i. p. 499, ed. Wetstein), who calls the painter Gelaton. He probably lived under the reign of Ptolemy IV Philopator (222–205 BC), and his picture was no doubt intended to ridicule the Alexandrian epic poets.
