= Pinakes =

Ancient catalogue of the Library of Alexandria

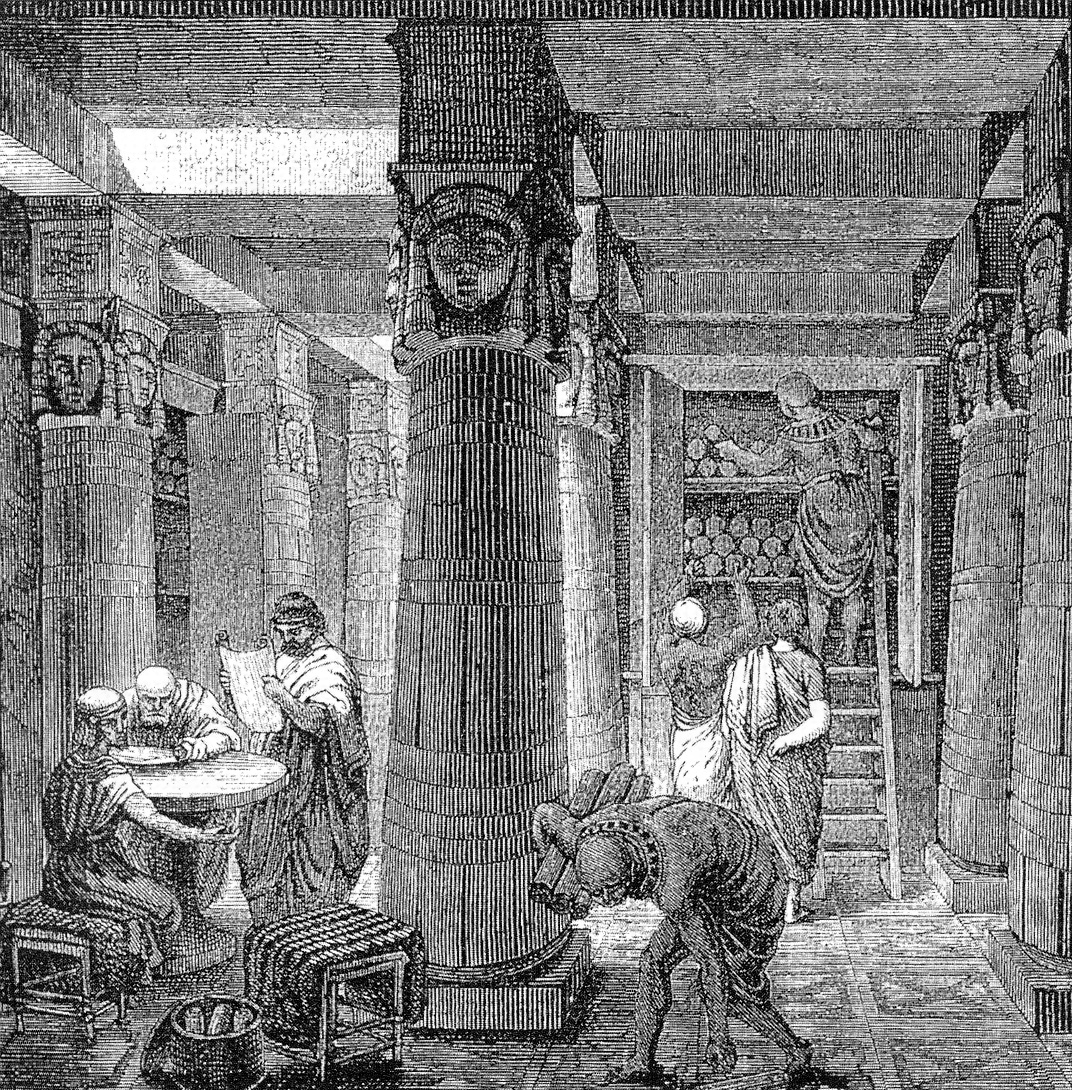
Imaginary depiction of the Library of Alexandria

The Pinakes (Ancient Greek: Πίνακες 'tables', plural of πίναξ pinax) is a lost bibliographic work composed by Callimachus (310/305–240 BCE) that is popularly considered to be the first library catalog in the West; its contents were based upon the holdings of the Library of Alexandria during Callimachus's tenure there during the third century BCE.

== History ==
The Library of Alexandria had been founded by Ptolemy I Soter about 306 BCE. The first recorded librarian was Zenodotus of Ephesus. During Zenodotus' tenure, Callimachus, who was never the head librarian, compiled many catalogues/lists, each called Pinakes. His most famous one listed authors and their works; thus he became the first known bibliographer and the scholar who organized the library by authors and subjects about 245 BCE. His work was 120 volumes long.

Apollonius of Rhodes was the successor to Zenodotus. Eratosthenes of Cyrene succeeded Apollonius in 235 BCE and compiled his tetagmenos epi teis megaleis bibliothekeis, the 'scheme of the great bookshelves'. In 195 BCE Aristophanes of Byzantium, Eratosthenes' successor, was the librarian and updated the Pinakes, although it is also possible that his work was not a supplement of Callimachus' Pinakes themselves, but an independent polemic against, or commentary upon, their contents.

== Description ==
The collection at the Library of Alexandria contained nearly 500,000 papyrus scrolls, which were grouped together by subject matter and stored in bins. Each bin carried a label with painted tablets hung above the stored papyri. Pinakes was named after these tablets and are a set of index lists. The bins gave bibliographical information for every roll. A typical entry started with a title and also provided the author's name, birthplace, father's name, any teachers trained under, and educational background. It contained a brief biography of the author and a list of the author's publications. The entry had the first line of the work, a summary of its contents, the name of the author, and information about the origin of the roll, as well as any doubts about the genuineness of the ascription.

Callimachus' system divided works into six genres of poetry and five sections of prose: rhetoric, law, epic, tragedy, comedy, lyric poetry, history, medicine, mathematics, natural science, and miscellanies. Each category was alphabetized by author.

Callimachus composed two other works that were referred as pinakes and were probably somewhat similar in format to the Pinakes (of which they "may or may not be subsections"), but were concerned with individual topics. These are listed by the Suda as: A Chronological Pinax and Description of Didaskaloi from the Beginning and Pinax of the Vocabulary and Treatises of Democritus.

== Later bibliographic pinakes ==
The term pinax was used for bibliographic catalogs beyond Callimachus. For example, Ptolemy-el-Garib's catalog of Aristotle's writings comes to us with the title Pinax (catalog) of Aristotle's writings.

== Legacy ==
The Pinakes proved indispensable to librarians for centuries, and they became a model for organizing knowledge throughout the Mediterranean. Their later influence can be traced to medieval times, even to the Arabic counterpart of the tenth century: Ibn al-Nadim's Al-Fihrist ("Index"). Local variations for cataloging and library classification continued through the late 19th century, when Anthony Panizzi and Melvil Dewey paved the way for more shared and standardized approaches.

== Bibliography ==
=== Texts and translations ===
- The evidence concerning the Pinakes is collected by Rudolf Pfeiffer (ed.), Callimachus, vol. I: Fragmenta, Oxford: Clarendon Press 1949, frr. 429-456 (with reference to the most important literature).
- Witty, F. J. "The Pinakes of Callimachus", Library Quarterly 28:1/4 (1958), 132–36, a translation of the work.
- Witty, F. J. "The Other Pinakes and Reference Works of Callimachus", Library Quarterly 43:3 (1973), 237–44.

=== Studies ===
- Bagnall, R. S. "Alexandria: Library of Dreams", Proceedings of the American Philosophical Society 46 (2002) 348–62.
- Blum, R. Kallimachos. The Alexandrian Library and the Origins of Bibliography, trans. H.H. Wellisch (U. Wisconsin, 1991). ISBN 978-0-299-13170-8.
- Krevans, N. "Callimachus and the Pedestrian Muse", in: A. Harder et al. (eds.) Callimachus II, Hellenistic Groningana 6 (Groningen, 2002) 173–84.
- West, M. L. "The Sayings of Democritus", Classical Review (1969) 142.
