= Ptolemy-el-Garib =

Hellenistic pinacographer

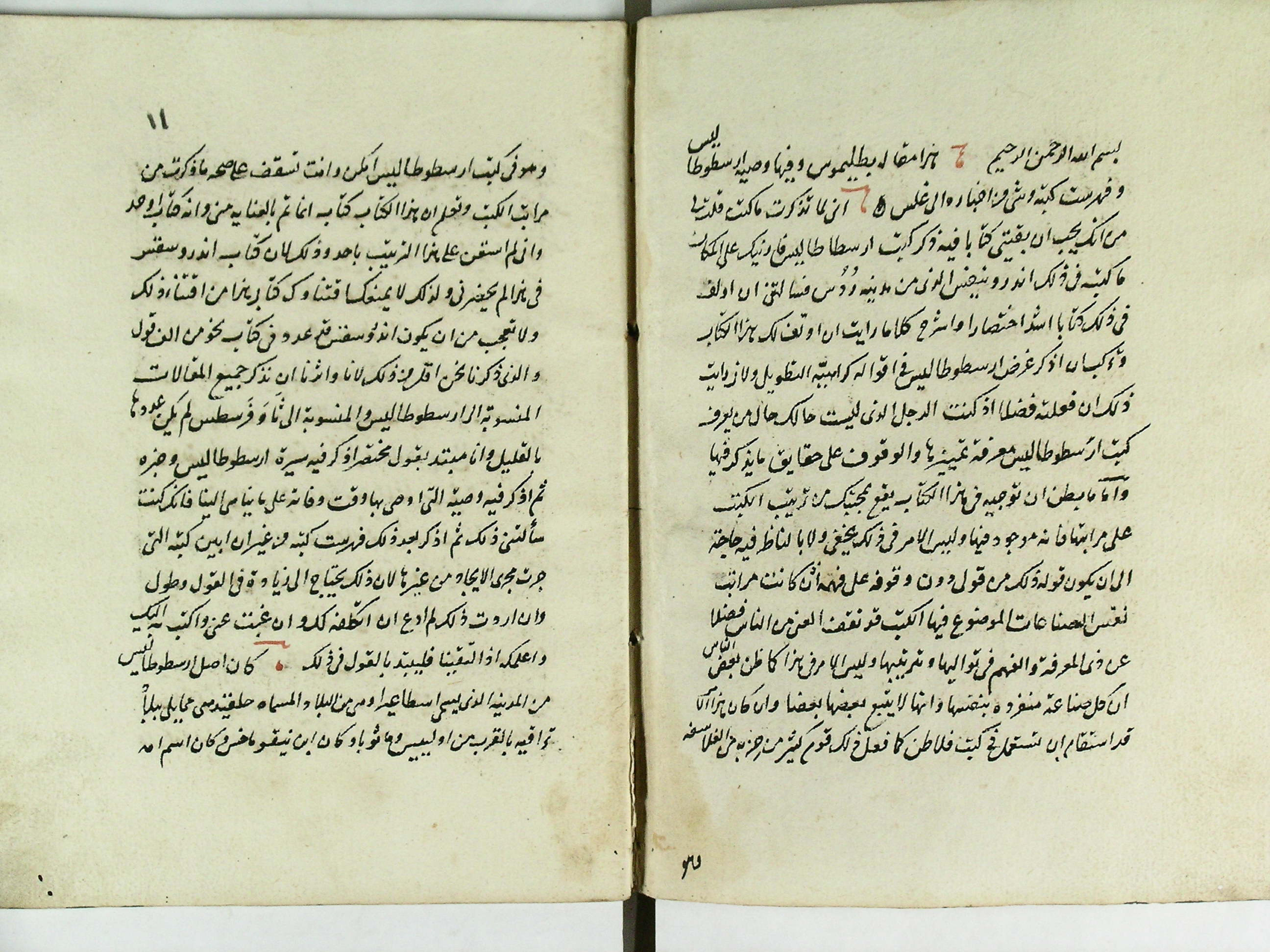
Manuscript of Life of Aristotle attributed to al-Gharib. Ms. Ayasofia 4833

Ptolemy-el-Garib (Arabic, more correctly al-gharīb, "Ptolemy the foreigner," explained as meaning "Ptolemy the unknown") (fl. c. AD 300) was a Hellenistic pinacographer, probably of the Peripatetic school, who wrote a Life of Aristotle notable for its catalog of Aristotle's works. This work survives in an Arabic manuscript in Istanbul. A critical edition, with French translation was published by Marwan Rashed.

== Historical context ==
The excerpts known prior to this discovery were collected in Ingemar Düring's Aristotle in the Ancient Biographical Tradition (Göteborg 1957), pp. 221–231.

Marian Plezia has cast doubt on the idea that Ptolemy-el-Garib's Life was an important source of later Neoplatonic lives of Aristotle.
