= Agallis =

2nd-century BC Ancient Greek female writer

Agallis (Ancient Greek: Ἀγαλλίς; called Anagallis Ancient Greek: Ἀναγαλλίς by the Suda) of Corcyra was a female grammarian who wrote about Homer. She, or her father, was a student of Aristophanes of Byzantium.

According to Athenaeus, she argued that ball games were invented by Nausicaa. Two scholiasts on the Iliad quote an argument that the two cities that Homer describes on the Shield of Achilles represented Athens and Eleusis; one attributes this to "Agallias of Corcyra", the other to "Dalis of Corcyra". Some scholars believe that Agallias was Agallis' father; others that it is an error and Agallis was the source of this argument.

Agallis is sometimes incorrectly described as a philosopher. This derives from the misconception that Ptolemy's Life of Aristotle was dedicated to her; it is now known to have been dedicated to a man named Gallus.
