= Apollonius Eidographus =

Ancient Greek grammarian

Apollonius Eidographus (Ancient Greek: Ἀπολλώνιος Εἰδογράφος) was a writer referred to by the Scholiast on Pindar respecting a contest in which Hiero won the prize. Some writers have thought he was a poet, but from the Etymologicum Magnum, it is probable that he was some learned grammarian. He was head of the Library at Alexandria, succeeding Aristophanes of Byzantium and succeeded by Aristarchus of Samothrace. He was called "eidographus" ("the classifier") because he classified lyric poems based on their musical modes.

== Notes ==
Preceded by Aristophanes of Byzantium	Head of the Library of Alexandria	Succeeded by Aristarchus of Samothrace
