= Aristophanes of Byzantium =

Greek literary scholar and grammarian

- Born: c. 257 BC; Byzantium (modern-day Istanbul, Turkey)
- Died: c. 185/180 BC; Alexandria (modern-day Egypt)

Aristophanes of Byzantium (Ancient Greek: Ἀριστοφάνης ὁ Βυζάντιος Aristophánēs ho Buzántios; Byzantium c. 257 BC – Alexandria c. 185–180 BC), not to be confused with Aristophanes of Athens, was a Hellenistic Greek scholar, critic and grammarian, particularly renowned for his work in Homeric scholarship, but also for work on other classical authors such as Pindar and Hesiod. He soon moved to Alexandria and studied under Zenodotus, Callimachus, and Dionysius Iambus. He succeeded Eratosthenes as head librarian of the Library of Alexandria at the age of sixty. His students included Callistratus, Aristarchus of Samothrace, and perhaps Agallis. He was succeeded by Apollonius "The Classifier" (not to be confused with Apollonius of Rhodes, a previous head librarian of Alexandria). Aristophanes' pupil, Aristarchus of Samothrace, would be the sixth head librarian at the Library of Alexandria.

== Work ==
Aristophanes was the first to deny that the "Precepts of Chiron" was the work of Hesiod.

=== Inventions ===
==== Accent system ====
Aristophanes is credited with reducing the accents used in Greek to designate pronunciation to a definite accent system, as the tonal, pitched system of archaic and Classical Greek was giving way (or had given way) to the stress-based system of Koine. This was also a period when Greek, in the wake of Alexander's conquests, was beginning to act as a lingua franca for the Eastern Mediterranean (replacing various Semitic languages). The accents were designed to assist in the pronunciation of Greek in older literary works.

==== Punctuation ====
He also invented one of the first forms of punctuation in c. 200 BC: single dots (théseis, Latin distinctiones) that separated verses (colometry), and indicated the amount of breath needed to complete each fragment of text when reading aloud (not to comply with rules of grammar, which were not applied to punctuation marks until centuries later). For a short passage (a komma), a stigmḕ mésē dot was placed mid-level (·). This is the origin of the modern comma punctuation mark, and its name. For a longer passage (a kolon), a hypostigmḗ dot was placed level with the bottom of the text (.), similar to a modern colon or semicolon, and for very long pauses (periodos), a stigmḕ teleía point near the top of the line of text (^{·}). He used a symbol resembling a ⊤ for an obelus.

=== Lexicography ===
As a lexicographer he compiled collections of archaic and unusual words. Aristophanes chiefly devoted himself to the poets (especially Homer) who had already been edited by his master Zenodotus. He also edited Hesiod, the chief lyric, tragic and comic poets, arranged Plato's dialogues in trilogies, and abridged Aristotle's Nature of Animals. His arguments to the plays of Aristophanes and the tragedians are in great part preserved. As a lexicographer, Aristophanes compiled collections of foreign and unusual words and expressions, and special lists (words denoting relationship, modes of address). He also wrote a whole book on the proverbial moaning stick of Archilochus, but the one surviving fragment from this pertains to shellfish.

=== Surviving works ===
All that has survived of Aristophanes of Byzantium's voluminous writings are a few fragments preserved through quotation in the literary commentaries, or scholia, of later writers, several argumenta to works of Greek drama, and part of a glossary. The most recent edition of the extant fragments was edited by William J. Slater.

== See also ==
- Lille Stesichorus

== General sources ==
Preceded by Eratosthenes	Head of the Library of Alexandria	Succeeded by Apollonius Eidographus
