= Library of Alexandria =

Library in ancient Alexandria, Egypt

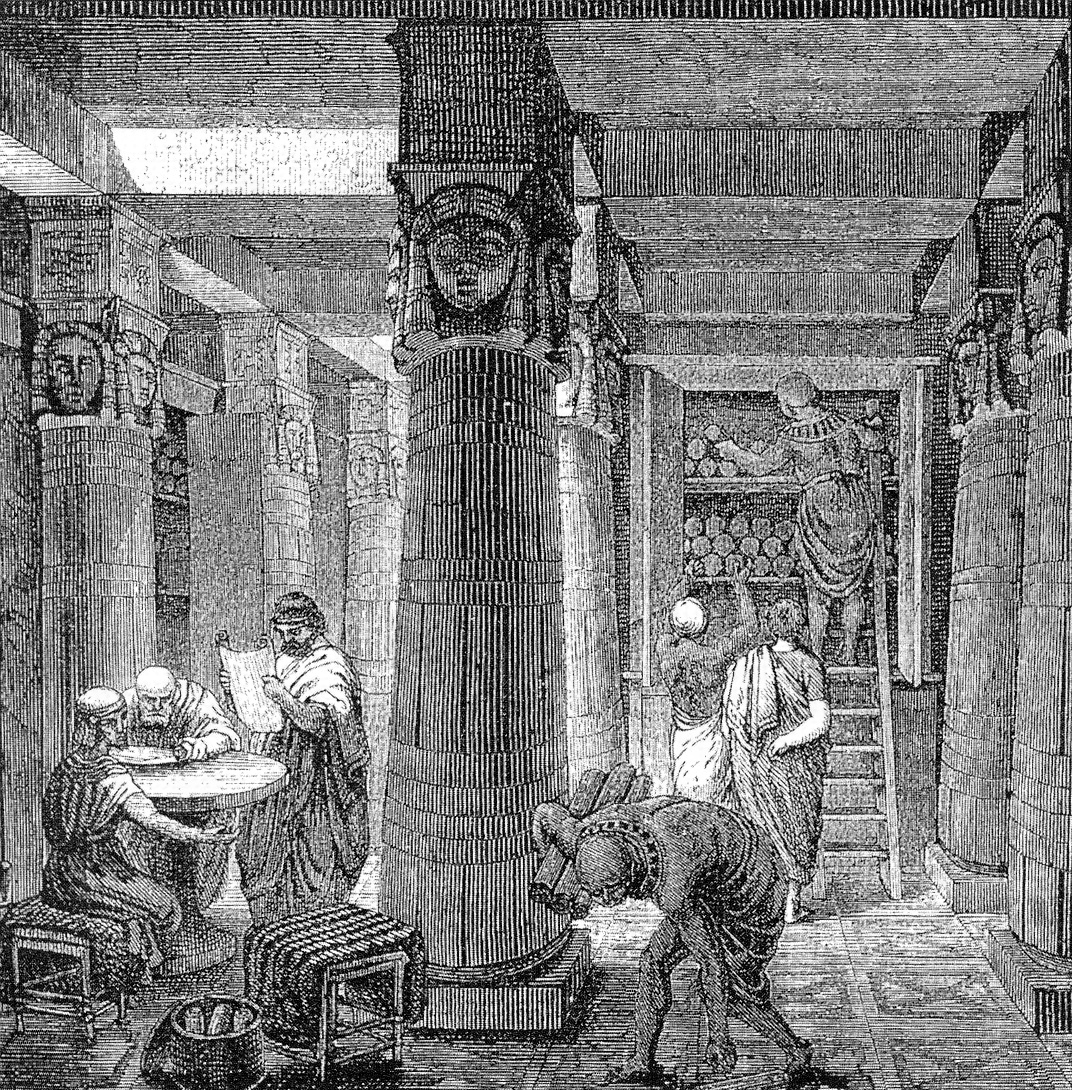
- Nineteenth-century artistic rendering of the Library of Alexandria by the German artist O. Von Corven, based partially on the archaeological evidence available at that time
- Location: Alexandria, Egypt, Ptolemaic Kingdom
- Type: National library
- Established: Possibly during the reign of Ptolemy II Philadelphus (285–246 BC)

Collection
- Items collected: Any written works
- Size: Estimates vary; somewhere between 40,000 and 700,000 scrolls, perhaps equivalent to roughly 100,000 books

Other information
- Employees: Estimated to have employed over 100 scholars at its height

The Library of Alexandria (a.k.a. the Great Library) in Alexandria, Egypt, was one of the largest and most significant libraries of the ancient world. The library was part of a larger research institution called the Mouseion, which was dedicated to the Muses, the nine goddesses of the arts. The idea of the library in Alexandria may have been proposed by Demetrius of Phalerum, an exiled Athenian statesman living in Alexandria, to Ptolemy I Soter, who may have established plans for the library, but the library itself was probably not built until the reign of his son Ptolemy II Philadelphus. The library quickly acquired many papyrus scrolls, owing largely to the Ptolemaic kings' aggressive and well-funded policies for procuring texts. It is unknown how many scrolls were housed at any given time at the Library of Alexandria, but estimates range from 40,000 to 700,000.

Alexandria came to be regarded as the capital of knowledge and learning in part because of the Great Library. Many important and influential scholars worked at the Library during the third and second centuries BC, including: Zenodotus of Ephesus, who worked towards standardizing the works of Homer; Callimachus, who wrote the Pinakes, sometimes considered the world's first library catalog; Apollonius of Rhodes, who composed the epic poem the Argonautica; Eratosthenes of Cyrene, who calculated the circumference of the earth within a few hundred kilometers of accuracy; Hero of Alexandria, who documented the first recorded steam engine; Aristophanes of Byzantium, who invented the system of Greek diacritics and was the first to divide poetic texts into lines; and Aristarchus of Samothrace, who produced the definitive texts of the Homeric poems as well as extensive commentaries on them. During the reign of Ptolemy III Euergetes, a daughter library was established in the Serapeum, a temple to the Greco-Egyptian god Serapis.

The influence of the Library declined gradually over the course of several centuries. This decline began with the purging of intellectuals from Alexandria in 145 BC during the reign of Ptolemy VIII Physcon, which resulted in Aristarchus of Samothrace, the head librarian, resigning and exiling himself to Cyprus. Many other scholars, including Dionysius Thrax and Apollodorus of Athens, fled to other cities, where they continued teaching and conducting scholarship.

The Library of Alexandria, or part of its collection, was burned by Julius Caesar during his civil war in 48 BC, but it is unclear how much was actually destroyed, and it seems to have either survived or been rebuilt shortly thereafter. The geographer Strabo mentions having visited the Mouseion in around 20 BC, and the prodigious scholarly output of Didymus Chalcenterus in Alexandria from this period indicates that he had access to at least some of the Library's resources.

The Library dwindled during the Roman period, from a lack of funding and support. Its membership appears to have ceased by the 260s AD. Between 270 and 275 AD, Alexandria saw a Palmyrene invasion and an imperial counterattack that probably destroyed whatever remained of the Library, if it still existed. Its associated, smaller library in the Serapeum may have survived after the main Library's destruction. The Serapeum, mainly used as a gathering place for Neoplatonist philosophers following the teachings of Iamblichus, was vandalized and demolished in 391 AD under a decree issued by bishop Theophilus of Alexandria.

== Historical background ==
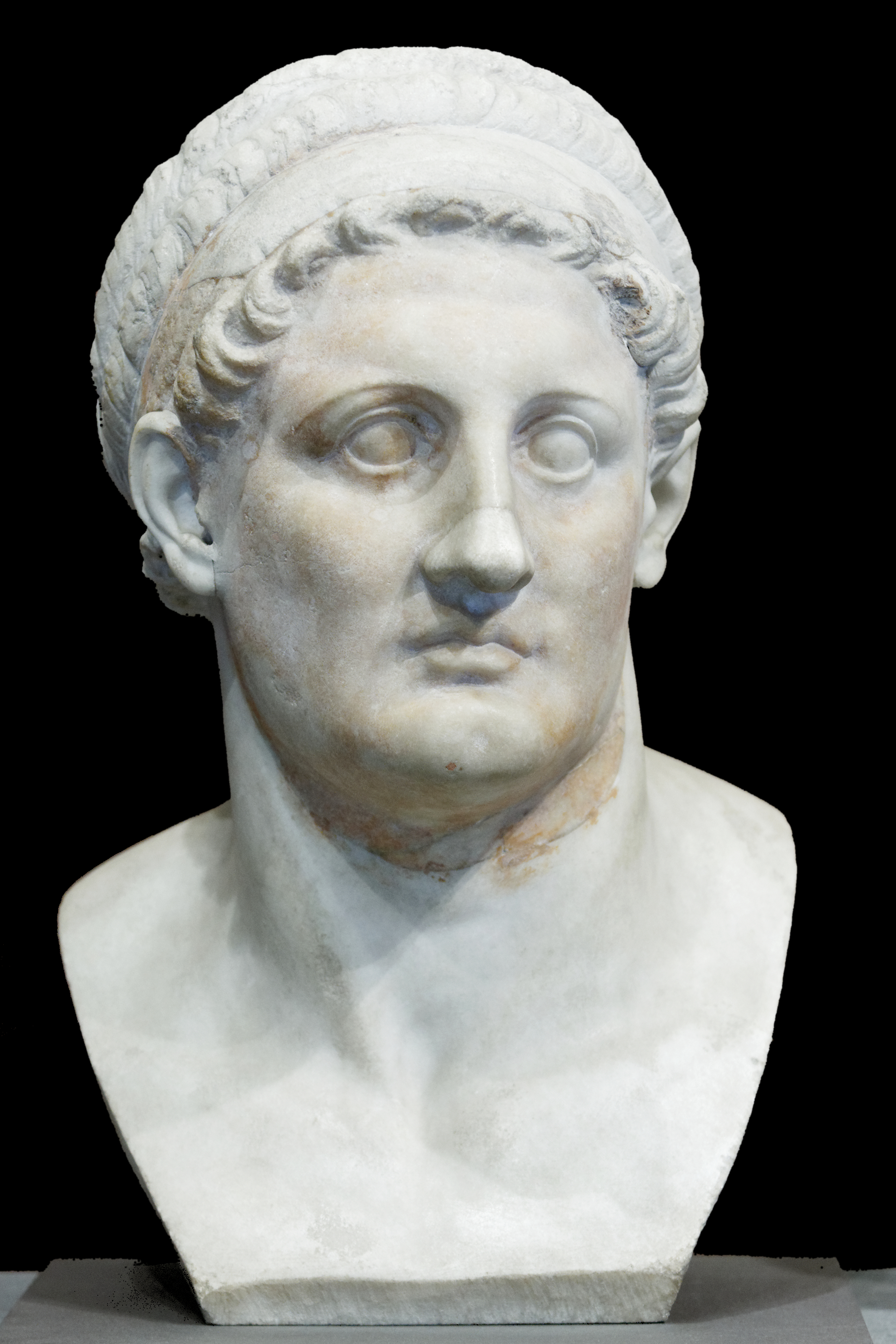
A Hellenistic bust depicting Ptolemy I Soter, 3rd century BC, the Louvre, Paris

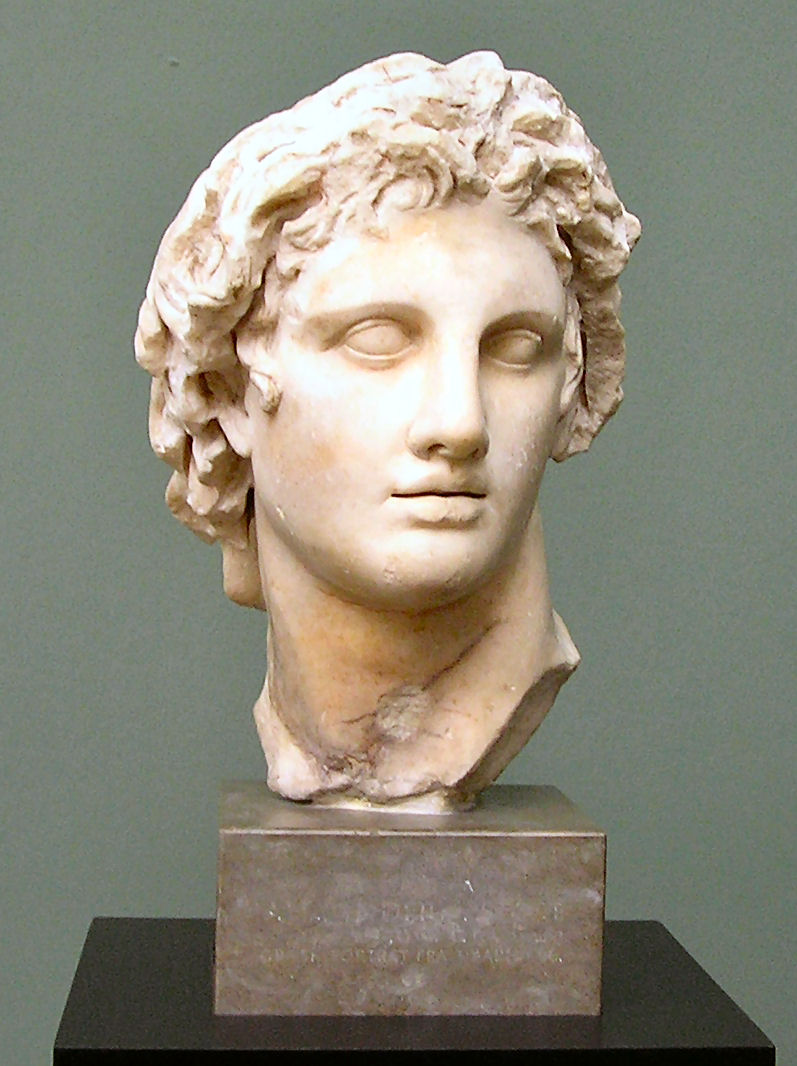
A Roman copy of an original 3rd century BC Greek bust depicting Alexander the Great, Ny Carlsberg Glyptotek, Copenhagen

The Library of Alexandria was not the first library of its kind. A long tradition of libraries existed in both Greece and in the ancient Near East. The earliest recorded archive of written materials comes from the ancient Sumerian city-state of Uruk in around 3400 BC, when writing had only just begun to develop. Scholarly curation of literary texts began in around 2500 BC. The later kingdoms and empires of the ancient Near East had long traditions of book collecting. The ancient Hittites and Assyrians had massive archives containing records written in many different languages. The most famous library of the ancient Near East was the Library of Ashurbanipal in Nineveh, founded in the seventh century BC by the Assyrian king Ashurbanipal (r. 668 – c. 627 BC). A large library also existed in Babylon during the reign of Nebuchadnezzar II (c. 605 – c. 562 BC). In Greece, the Athenian tyrant Pisistratus was said to have founded the first major public library in the sixth century BC. It was out of this mixed heritage of both Greek and Near Eastern book collections that the idea for the Library of Alexandria may have been born through Alexander.

Following the death of Alexander the Great in 323 BC, there was a power grab for his empire among his top-ranking officers. The empire was divided into three: the Antigonid dynasty controlled Greece; the Seleucid dynasty, who had their capitals at Antioch and Seleucia, controlled large areas of Asia Minor, Syria, and Mesopotamia; and the Ptolemaic dynasty controlled Egypt with Alexandria as its capital. The Macedonian kings who succeeded Alexander the Great as rulers of the Near East wanted to promote Hellenistic culture and learning throughout the known world. These rulers, therefore, had a vested interest in collecting and compiling information from both the Greeks and the far more ancient kingdoms of the Near East. Libraries enhanced a city's prestige, attracted scholars, and provided practical assistance in ruling and governing the kingdom. Eventually, for these reasons, every major Hellenistic urban center would have a royal library. The Library of Alexandria, however, was unprecedented because of the scope and scale of the Ptolemies' ambitions; unlike their predecessors and contemporaries, the Ptolemies wanted to produce a repository of all knowledge. To support this endeavor, they were well positioned as Egypt was the ideal habitat for the papyrus plant, which provided an abundant supply of materials needed to amass their knowledge repository.

== Under Ptolemaic patronage ==
=== Founding ===
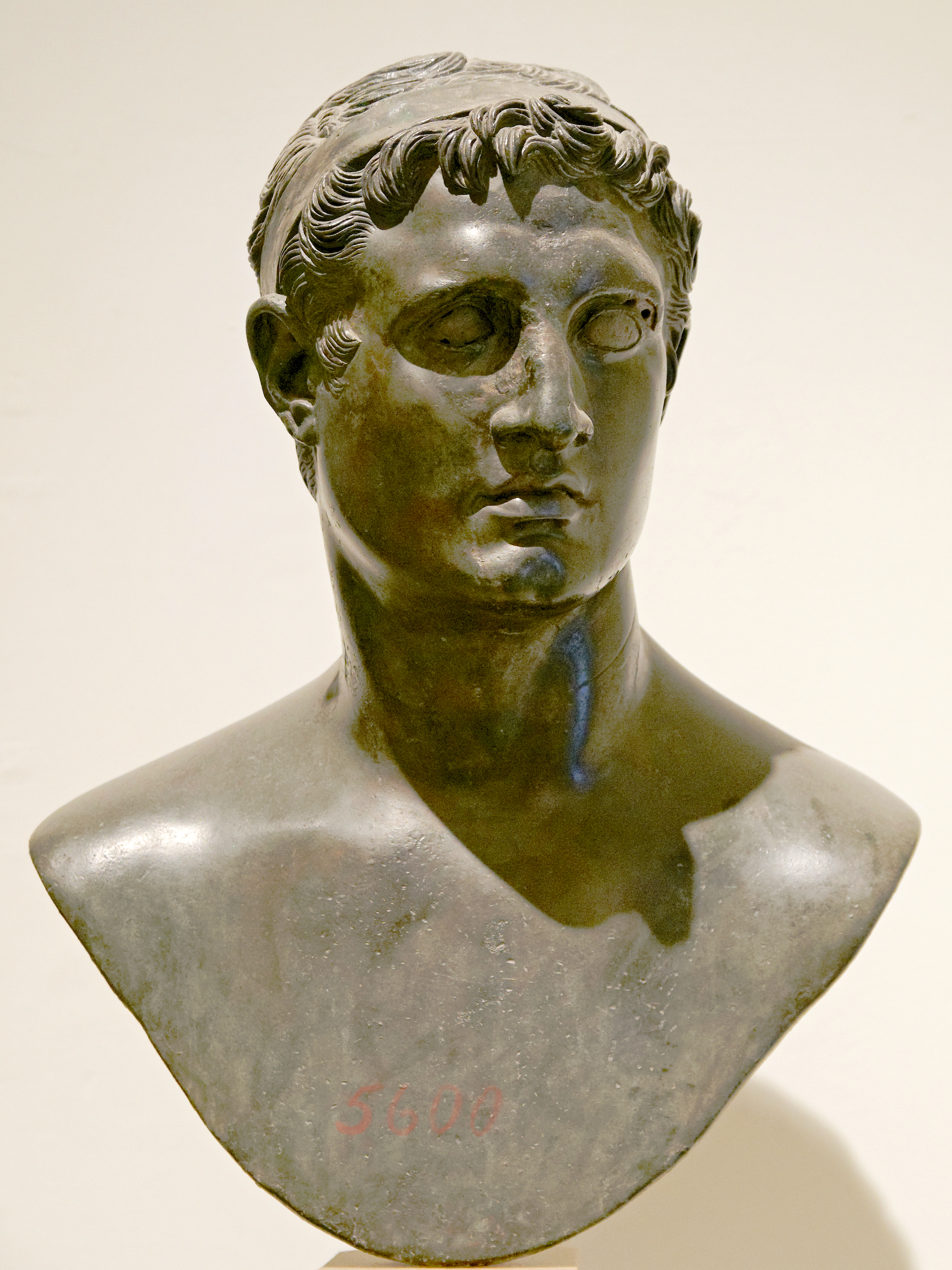
Bust excavated at the Villa of the Papyri depicting Ptolemy II Philadelphus, who is believed to have been the one to establish the Library as an actual institution. However, plans for it may have been developed by his father Ptolemy I Soter

The Library was one of the largest and most significant libraries of the ancient world, but details about it are a mixture of history and legend. The earliest known surviving source of information on the founding of the Library of Alexandria is the pseudepigraphic Letter of Aristeas, which was composed between c. 180 and c. 145 BC. It claims the Library was founded during the reign of Ptolemy I Soter (r. c. 323 – c. 283 BC) and that it was initially organized by Demetrius of Phalerum, a student of Aristotle who had been exiled from Athens and taken refuge in Alexandria within the Ptolemaic court. Nonetheless, the Letter of Aristeas is very late and contains information that is now known to be inaccurate. According to Diogenes Laertius, Demetrius was a student of Theophrastus, a student of Aristotle. Other sources claim that the Library was instead created under the reign of Ptolemy I's son Ptolemy II Philadelphus (283–246 BC).

Modern scholars agree that while it is possible that Ptolemy I, a historian and author of an account of Alexander's campaign, laid the groundwork for the Library, it probably did not become a physical institution until the reign of Ptolemy II. By that time, Demetrius of Phalerum had fallen out of favor with the Ptolemaic court. He probably would not, therefore, have had any role in establishing the Library as an institution. Stephen V. Tracy, however, argues that it is highly probable that Demetrius played an important role in collecting at least some of the earliest texts that would later become part of the Library's collection. In c. 295 BC, Demetrius may have acquired early versions of the writings of Aristotle and Theophrastus, which he would have been uniquely positioned to do since he was a distinguished member of the Peripatetic school.

The Library was built in the Brucheion (Royal Quarter) as part of the Mouseion. (Note: "Mouseion" means "House of Muses", whence the term "museum".) Its main purpose was to show off the wealth of Egypt, with research as a lesser goal. Nevertheless, its contents were used to aid the ruler of Egypt. The exact layout of the library is not known, but ancient sources describe the Library of Alexandria as comprising a collection of scrolls, Greek columns, a peripatos walk, a room for shared dining, a reading room, meeting rooms, gardens, and lecture halls, creating a model for the modern university campus. A hall contained shelves for the collections of papyrus scrolls known as bibliothekai (βιβλιοθῆκαι). According to popular description, an inscription above the shelves read: "The place of the cure of the soul."

=== Early expansion and organization ===
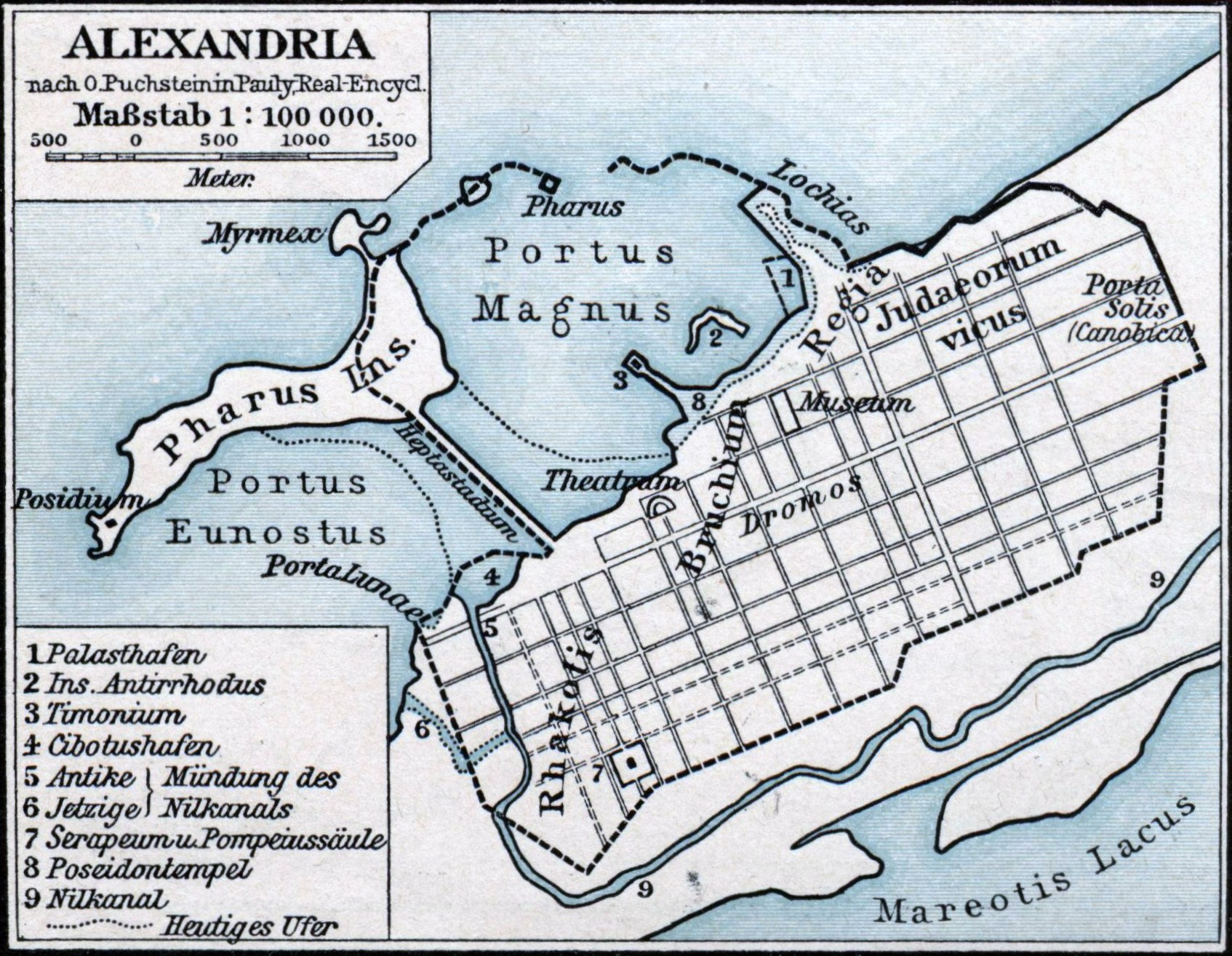
Map of ancient Alexandria. The Mouseion was located in the royal Broucheion quarter (listed on this map as "Bruchium") in the central part of the city near the Great Harbor ("Portus Magnus" on the map).

The Ptolemaic rulers intended the Library to be a collection of all knowledge, and they worked to expand its collections through an aggressive, well-funded policy of book purchasing. They dispatched royal agents with large amounts of money and ordered them to purchase and collect as many texts as they possibly could, about any subject and by any author. Older copies of texts were favored over newer ones, since it was assumed that older copies had undergone less copying and that they were, therefore, more likely to resemble what the original author had written more closely. This program involved trips to the book fairs of Rhodes and Athens. According to the Greek medical writer Galen, under the decree of Ptolemy II, any books found on ships that came into port were taken to the library, where they were copied by official scribes. The original texts were kept in the library and the copies delivered to the owners. The Library particularly focused on acquiring manuscripts of the Homeric poems, which were the foundation of Greek education and revered above all other poems. The Library therefore acquired many different manuscripts of these poems, tagging each copy with a label to indicate where it had come from.

In addition to collecting works from the past, the Mouseion, which housed the Library, also served as home to a host of international scholars, poets, philosophers, and researchers, who, according to the first-century BC Greek geographer Strabo, were provided with a large salary, free food and lodging, and exemption from taxes. They had a large, circular dining hall with a high domed ceiling in which they ate meals communally. There were also numerous classrooms in which the scholars were expected to teach students at least occasionally. Ptolemy II Philadelphus is said to have had a keen interest in zoology, so it has been speculated that the Mouseion may have even had a zoo for exotic animals. According to classical scholar Lionel Casson, the idea was that if the scholars were completely freed from all the burdens of everyday life, they would be able to devote more time to research and intellectual pursuits. Strabo called the group of scholars who lived at the Mouseion a σύνοδος (synodos, 'community'). As early as 283 BC, they may have numbered between thirty and fifty learned men.

=== Early scholarship ===
The Library of Alexandria was not affiliated with any particular philosophical school; consequently, scholars who studied there had considerable academic freedom. They were, however, subject to the authority of the king. One likely apocryphal story is told of a poet named Sotades, who wrote an obscene epigram making fun of Ptolemy II for marrying his sister, Arsinoe II. Ptolemy II is said to have jailed him and, after he escaped and was caught again, sealed him in a lead jar and dropped him into the sea. As a religious center, the Mouseion was directed by a priest of the Muses known as an epistates, who was appointed by the king in the same manner as the priests who managed the various Egyptian temples. The Library itself was directed by a scholar who served as head librarian and tutor to the king's son.

The first recorded head librarian was Zenodotus of Ephesus (c. 325 – c. 270 BC). Zenodotus's main work was devoted to the establishment of canonical texts for the Homeric poems and the early Greek lyric poets. Most of what is known about him comes from later commentaries that mention his preferred readings of particular passages. Zenodotus is known to have written a glossary of rare and unusual words, which was organized in alphabetical order, making him the first person known to have employed alphabetical order as a method of organization. Since the collection at the Library of Alexandria seems to have been organized in alphabetical order by the first letter of the author's name from very early, Casson concludes that it is highly probable that Zenodotus was the one who organized it in this way. Zenodotus's system of alphabetization, however, only used the first letter of the word, and it was not until the second century AD that anyone is known to have applied the same method of alphabetization to the remaining letters of the word.

Meanwhile, the scholar and poet Callimachus compiled the Pinakes, a 120-book catalogue of various authors and all their known works. The Pinakes has not survived in whole, but enough references to it and fragments of it have survived to allow scholars to reconstruct its basic structure. The Pinakes was divided into multiple sections, each containing entries for writers of a particular genre of literature. The most basic division was between writers of poetry and prose, with each section divided into smaller subsections. Each section listed authors in alphabetical order. Each entry included the author's name, father's name, place of birth, and other brief biographical information, sometimes including nicknames by which that author was known, followed by a complete list of all that author's known works. The entries for prolific authors such as Aeschylus, Euripides, Sophocles, and Theophrastus must have been extremely long, spanning multiple columns of text. Although Callimachus did his most famous work at the Library of Alexandria, he never held the position of head librarian there. Callimachus's pupil Hermippus of Smyrna wrote biographies, Philostephanus of Cyrene studied geography, and Istros the Callimachean (who may have also been from Cyrene) studied Attic antiquities. In addition to the Great Library, many other smaller libraries also began to spring up all around the city of Alexandria.

According to legend, the Syracusan inventor Archimedes invented the Archimedes' screw, a pump for transporting water, while studying at the Library of Alexandria.

After Zenodotus either died or retired, Ptolemy II Philadelphus appointed Apollonius of Rhodes (c. 295 – c. 215 BC), a native of Alexandria and a student of Callimachus, as the second head librarian of the Library of Alexandria. Philadelphus also appointed Apollonius of Rhodes as the tutor to his son, the future Ptolemy III Euergetes. Apollonius of Rhodes is best known as the author of the Argonautica, an epic poem about the voyages of Jason and the Argonauts, which has survived to the present in its complete form. The Argonautica displays Apollonius's vast knowledge of history and literature and makes allusions to a vast array of events and texts while simultaneously imitating the style of the Homeric poems. Some fragments of his scholarly writings have also survived, but he is generally more famous today as a poet than as a scholar.

According to legend, during the librarianship of Apollonius, the mathematician and inventor Archimedes (c. 287 – c. 212 BC) came to visit the Library of Alexandria. During his time in Egypt, Archimedes is said to have observed the rise and fall of the Nile, leading him to invent the Archimedes' screw, which can be used to transport water from low-lying bodies into irrigation ditches. Archimedes later returned to Syracuse, where he continued making new inventions.

According to two late and largely unreliable biographies, Apollonius was forced to resign from his position as head librarian and moved to the island of Rhodes (after which he takes his name) on account of the hostile reception he received in Alexandria to the first draft of his Argonautica. It is more likely that Apollonius's resignation was on account of Ptolemy III Euergetes's ascension to the throne in 246 BC.

=== Later scholarship and expansion ===
The third head librarian, Eratosthenes of Cyrene (c. 280 – c. 194 BC), is best known today for his scientific works, but he was also a literary scholar. Eratosthenes's most important work was his treatise Geographika, which was originally in three volumes. The work itself has not survived, but many fragments of it are preserved through quotation in the writings of the later geographer Strabo. Eratosthenes was the first scholar to apply mathematics to geography and map-making and, in his treatise Concerning the Measurement of the Earth, he calculated the Earth's circumference and was only off by less than a few hundred kilometers . Eratosthenes also produced a map of the entire known world, which incorporated information taken from sources held in the Library, including accounts of Alexander the Great's campaigns in India and reports written by members of Ptolemaic elephant-hunting expeditions along the coast of East Africa.

Eratosthenes was the first person to advance geography towards becoming a scientific discipline. Eratosthenes believed that the setting of the Homeric poems was purely imaginary and argued that the purpose of poetry was "to capture the soul", rather than to give a historically accurate account of actual events. Strabo quotes him as having sarcastically commented, "a man might find the places of Odysseus' wanderings if the day were to come when he would find the leatherworker who stitched the goatskin of the winds." Meanwhile, scholars at the Library of Alexandria displayed interest in other scientific subjects. Bacchius of Tanagra, a contemporary of Eratosthenes, edited and commented on the medical writings of the Hippocratic Corpus. The physicians Herophilos (c. 335 – c. 280 BC) and Erasistratus (c. 304 – c. 250 BC) studied human anatomy, but their studies were hindered by protests against the dissection of human cadavers, which was seen as immoral at the time.

According to Galen, around this time, Ptolemy III requested permission from the Athenians to borrow the original manuscripts of Aeschylus, Sophocles, and Euripides, for which the Athenians demanded the enormous amount of fifteen talents (1,000 lb; 450 kg) of a precious metal as guarantee that he would return them. Ptolemy III had expensive copies of the plays made on the highest quality papyrus and sent the Athenians the copies, keeping the original manuscripts for the library and telling the Athenians they could keep the talents. This story may also be construed to show the power of Alexandria over Athens during the Ptolemaic dynasty. This detail arises from the fact that Alexandria was a man-made bidirectional port between the mainland and the Pharos island, welcoming trade from the East and West, and soon found itself to be an international hub for trade, the leading producer of papyrus and, soon enough, books. As the Library expanded, it ran out of space to house the scrolls in its collection, so, during the reign of Ptolemy III Euergetes, it opened a satellite collection in the Serapeum of Alexandria, a temple to the Greco-Egyptian god Serapis located near the royal palace.

=== Peak of literary criticism ===
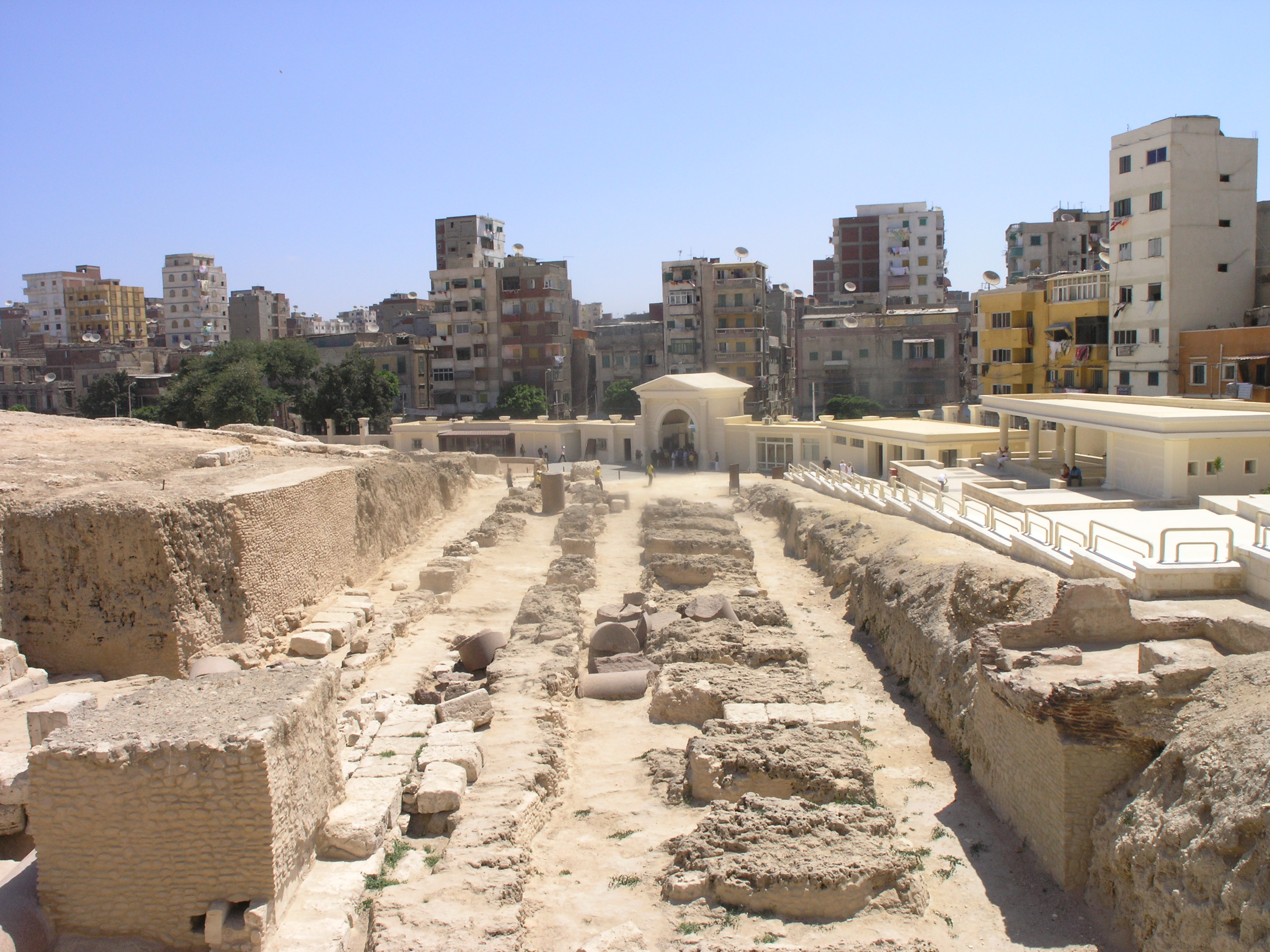
Present-day ruins of the Serapeum of Alexandria, where the Library of Alexandria moved part of its collection after it ran out of storage space in the main building

Aristophanes of Byzantium (c. 257 – c. 180 BC) became the fourth head librarian sometime around 200 BC. According to a legend recorded by the Roman writer Vitruvius, Aristophanes was one of seven judges appointed for a poetry competition hosted by Ptolemy III Euergetes. All six of the other judges favored one competitor, but Aristophanes favored the one whom the audience had liked the least. Aristophanes declared that all of the poets except for the one he had chosen had committed plagiarism and were therefore disqualified. The king demanded that he prove this, so he retrieved the texts that the authors had plagiarized from the Library, locating them by memory. On account of his impressive memory and diligence, Ptolemy III appointed him as head librarian.

The librarianship of Aristophanes of Byzantium is widely considered to have opened a more mature phase of scholarship in the Library of Alexandria's history. During this phase, literary criticism reached its peak and came to dominate the Library's scholarly output. Aristophanes of Byzantium edited poetic texts and introduced the division of poems into separate lines on the page, since they had previously been written out just like prose. He also invented the system of Greek diacritics, wrote important works on lexicography, and introduced a series of signs for textual criticism. He wrote introductions to many plays, some of which have survived in partially rewritten forms.

The fifth head librarian was an obscure individual named Apollonius Eidographus, who is known by the epithet "the classifier of forms" (ὁ εἰδογράφος, ho eidographos). One late lexicographical source explains this epithet as referring to the classification of poetry on the basis of musical forms.

During the early second century BC, several scholars at the Library of Alexandria studied works on medicine. Zeuxis the Empiricist is credited with having written commentaries on the Hippocratic Corpus, and he actively worked to procure medical writings for the Library's collection. A scholar named Ptolemy Epithetes wrote a treatise on wounds in the Homeric poems, a subject straddling the line between traditional philology and medicine. However, it was also during the early second century BC that the political power of Ptolemaic Egypt began to decline. After the Battle of Raphia in 217 BC, Ptolemaic power became increasingly unstable. There were uprisings among segments of the Egyptian population and, in the first half of the second century BC, connections with Upper Egypt became largely disrupted. Ptolemaic rulers also began to emphasize the Egyptian aspect of their nation over the Greek aspect. Consequently, many Greek scholars began to leave Alexandria for safer countries with more generous patronages.

Aristarchus of Samothrace (c. 216 – c. 145 BC) was the sixth head librarian. He earned a reputation as the greatest of all ancient scholars of Homeric poetry and produced not only texts of classic poems and works of prose, but full hypomnemata ([/hy.poˈmnɛː.ma.ta/]; ὑπομνήματα, 'memoranda')—long, free-standing commentaries—on them. These commentaries would typically cite a passage of a classical text, explain its meaning, define any unusual words used in it, and comment on whether the words in the passage were really those used by the original author or if they were later interpolations added by scribes. He made many contributions to a variety of studies, but particularly the study of the Homeric poems, and his editorial opinions are widely quoted by ancient authors as authoritative. A portion of one of Aristarchus' commentaries on the Histories of Herodotus has survived in a papyrus fragment. In 145 BC, however, Aristarchus became caught up in a dynastic struggle in which he supported Ptolemy VII Neos Philopator as the ruler of Egypt. Ptolemy VII was murdered and succeeded by Ptolemy VIII Physcon, who immediately set about punishing all those who had supported his predecessor, forcing Aristarchus to flee Egypt and take refuge on the island of Cyprus, where he died shortly after. Ptolemy VIII expelled all foreign scholars from Alexandria, forcing them to disperse across the Eastern Mediterranean.

== Decline ==
=== After Ptolemy VIII's expulsions ===
Ptolemy VIII Physcon's expulsion of the scholars from Alexandria brought about a shift in the history of Hellenistic scholarship. The scholars who had studied at the Library of Alexandria and their students continued to conduct research and write treatises, but most of them no longer did so in association with the Library. Due to this, the Library of Alexandria began to decline in respect and prestige. A diaspora of Alexandrian scholarship occurred, in which scholars of the Library dispersed first into the eastern Mediterranean and then into the world of the western Mediterranean as well. Former scholars and their disciples took their scholarly energies elsewhere. For example, Aristarchus's student Dionysius Thrax (c. 170 – c. 90 BC) established a school on the Greek island of Rhodes. He also wrote the first book on Greek grammar, a succinct guide to speaking and writing clearly and effectively, which remained the primary grammar textbook for Greek schoolboys until as late as the twelfth century AD. Another one of Aristarchus's pupils, Apollodorus of Athens (c. 180 – c. 110 BC), went to Alexandria's greatest rival, Pergamum, where he taught and conducted research. This scholarly diaspora prompted the historian Menecles of Barca to sarcastically comment that Alexandria had become the teacher of all Greeks and barbarians alike.

Meanwhile, in Alexandria, from the middle of the second century BC onwards, Ptolemaic rule in Egypt grew less stable than it had been previously. Confronted with growing social unrest and other major political and economic problems, the later Ptolemies did not devote as much attention to the Library and the Mouseion as their predecessors had, continuing the decline that had begun under Ptolemy VIII Physcon. The status of both the Library and the head librarian diminished. Several of the later Ptolemies used the position of head librarian as a mere political plum to reward their most devoted supporters. Ptolemy VIII appointed a man named Cydas, one of his palace guards, as head librarian, and Ptolemy IX Soter II (r. 88–81 BC) is said to have given the position to a political supporter. Eventually, the position of head librarian lost so much of its former prestige that even contemporary authors ceased to take interest in recording the terms of office for individual head librarians.

A shift in Greek scholarship at large occurred around the beginning of the first century BC. By this time, all major classical poetic texts had finally been standardized and extensive commentaries had already been produced on the writings of all the major literary authors of the Greek Classical Era. Consequently, there was little original work left for scholars to do with these texts. Many scholars began producing syntheses and reworkings of the commentaries of the Alexandrian scholars of previous centuries, at the expense of their own originalities. (Note: This shift paralleled a similar, concurrent trend in philosophy, in which many philosophers were beginning to synthesize the views of earlier philosophers rather than coming up with original ideas of their own.) Other scholars branched out and began writing commentaries on the poetic works of postclassical authors, including Alexandrian poets such as Callimachus and Apollonius of Rhodes. Meanwhile, Alexandrian scholarship was probably introduced to Rome in the first century BC by Tyrannion of Amisus (c. 100 – c. 25 BC), a student of Dionysius Thrax.

=== Burning by Julius Caesar ===
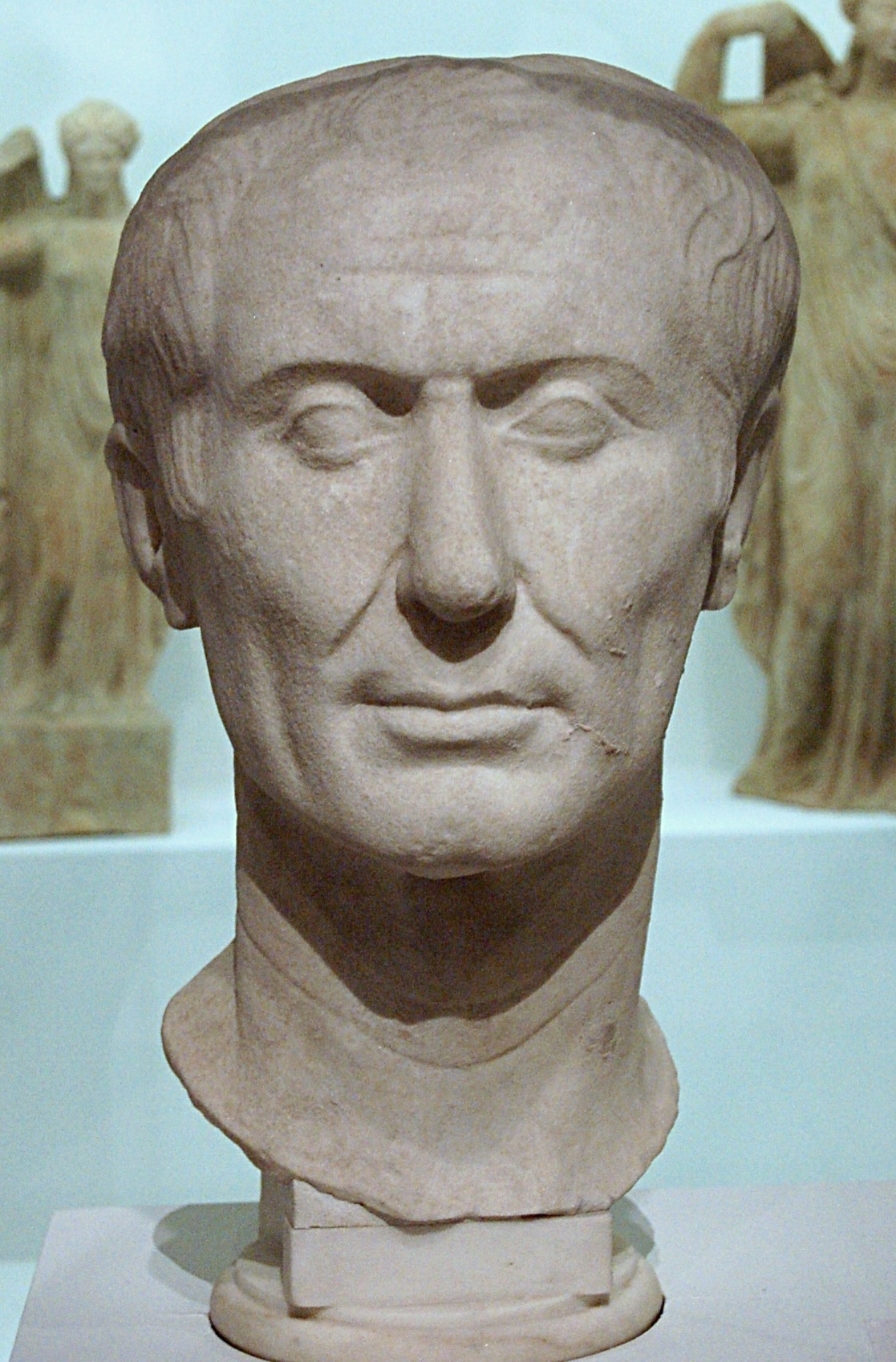
Julius Caesar burned Ptolemy's ships during the Siege of Alexandria in 48 BC. Ancient writers said the fire spread and destroyed part of the Library's collections; the Library seems to have partially survived or been quickly rebuilt.

In 48 BC, during Caesar's Civil War, Julius Caesar was besieged at Alexandria. His soldiers set fire to some of the Egyptian ships docked in the Alexandrian port while trying to clear the wharves to block the fleet belonging to Cleopatra's brother, Ptolemy XIII Theos Philopator. This fire purportedly spread to the parts of the city nearest to the docks, causing considerable devastation in that area. The first-century AD Roman playwright and Stoic philosopher Seneca the Younger quotes Livy's Ab Urbe Condita Libri, which was written between 27 and 9 BC, as saying that the fire started by Caesar destroyed 40,000 scrolls from the Library of Alexandria. The Greek Middle Platonist Plutarch (c. 46–120 AD) writes in his Life of Caesar that, "[W]hen the enemy endeavored to cut off his communication by sea, he was forced to divert that danger by setting fire to his ships, which, after burning the docks, thence spread on and destroyed the great library." The Roman historian Cassius Dio (c. 155 – c. 235 AD), however, writes: "Many places were set on fire, with the result that, along with other buildings, the dockyards and storehouses of grain and books, said to be great in number and of the finest, were burned." However, Florus and Lucan only mention that the flames burned the fleet itself and some "houses near the sea".

Scholars have interpreted Cassius Dio's wording to indicate that the fire did not actually destroy the entire Library itself, but rather one or more Library warehouses near the docks. Whatever damage Caesar's fire may have caused, evidently the Library was not completely destroyed. The geographer Strabo (c. 63 BC – c. 24 AD) mentions visiting the Mouseion, the larger research institution to which the Library was attached, in c. 20 BC, several decades after Caesar's fire, indicating that it either survived the fire or was rebuilt soon afterwards. Nonetheless, Strabo's manner of talking about the Mouseion shows that it was nowhere near as prestigious as it had been a few centuries prior. It is unknown whether this was due to historical decline or catastrophic destruction. Despite mentioning the Mouseion, Strabo does not mention the Library separately, perhaps indicating that it had been so drastically reduced in stature and significance that Strabo felt it did not warrant separate mention. It is unclear what happened to the Mouseion after Strabo's mention of it.

Furthermore, Plutarch records in his Life of Mark Antony that in the years leading up to the Battle of Actium in 33 BC, Mark Antony was rumored to have given Cleopatra all 200,000 scrolls in the Library of Pergamum. Plutarch himself notes that his source for this anecdote was sometimes unreliable, and the story may be nothing more than propaganda intended to show that Mark Antony was loyal to Cleopatra and Egypt rather than to Rome. Casson, however, argues that even if the story were made up, it would not have been believable unless the Library still existed. Edward J. Watts argues that Mark Antony's gift may have been intended to replenish the Library's collection after the damage to it caused by Caesar's fire roughly a decade and a half prior.

Further evidence for the Library's survival after 48 BC comes from the fact that the most notable producer of composite commentaries during the late first century BC and early first century AD was a scholar who worked in Alexandria named Didymus Chalcenterus, whose epithet Χαλκέντερος (Chalkénteros) means "bronze guts". Didymus is said to have produced somewhere between 3,500 and 4,000 books, making him the most prolific known writer in all of antiquity. He was also given the nickname βιβλιολάθης (Biblioláthēs), meaning "book-forgetter" because it was said that even he could not remember all the books he had written. Parts of some of Didymus' commentaries have been preserved in the form of later extracts, and these remains are modern scholars' most important sources of information about the critical works of the earlier scholars at the Library of Alexandria. Lionel Casson states that Didymus' prodigious output "would have been impossible without at least a good part of the resources of the library at his disposal".

=== Roman period and destruction ===
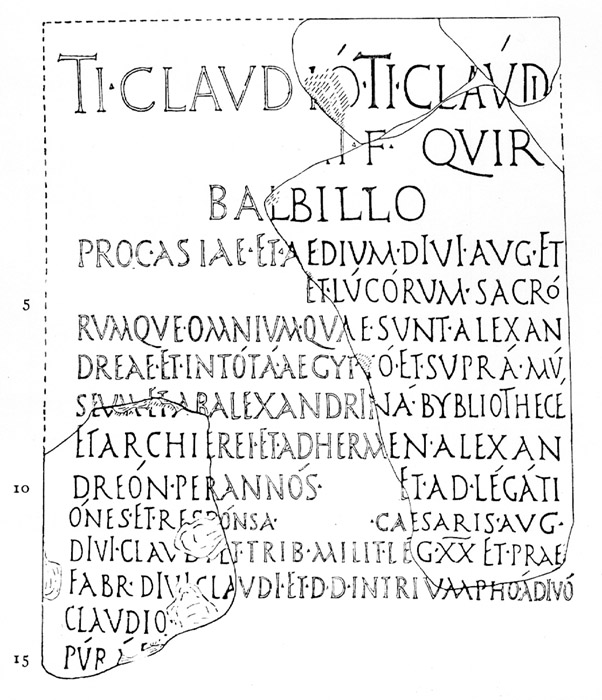
This Latin inscription regarding Tiberius Claudius Balbilus of Rome (d. c. AD 79) mentions the "ALEXANDRINA BYBLIOTHECE" (line eight).

Very little is known about the Library of Alexandria during the time of the Roman principate (27 BC – 284 AD). The emperor Claudius (r. 41–54 AD) is recorded to have built an extension to the Library, but it seems that the Library of Alexandria's general fortunes followed those of the city of Alexandria itself. After Alexandria came under Roman rule, the city's status and, consequently, that of its famous Library, gradually diminished. While the Mouseion still existed, membership was granted not on the basis of scholarly achievement but rather on the basis of distinction in government, the military, or even athletics.

The same was evidently the case even for the position of head librarian; the only known head librarian from the Roman Period was a man named Tiberius Claudius Balbilus, who lived in the middle of the first century AD and was a politician, administrator, and military officer with no record of substantial scholarly achievements. Members of the Mouseion were no longer required to teach, conduct research, or even live in Alexandria. The Greek writer Philostratus records that the emperor Hadrian (r. 117–138 AD) appointed the ethnographer Dionysius of Miletus and the sophist Polemon of Laodicea as members of the Mouseion, even though neither of these men is known to have ever spent any significant amount of time in Alexandria.

As the reputation of Alexandrian scholarship declined, the reputations of other libraries across the Mediterranean world improved, diminishing the Library of Alexandria's former status as the most prominent. Other libraries also sprang up within the city of Alexandria itself and the scrolls from the Great Library may have been used to stock some of these smaller libraries. The Caesareum and the Claudianum in Alexandria are both known to have had major libraries by the end of the first century AD. The Serapeum, originally the "daughter library" of the Great Library, probably expanded during this period as well, according to classical historian Edward J. Watts.

By the second century AD, the Roman Empire had grown less dependent on grain from Alexandria, and the city's prominence declined further. The Romans during this period also showed less interest in Alexandrian scholarship, causing the Library's reputation to continue to decline. The scholars who worked and studied at the Library of Alexandria during the time of the Roman Empire were less well known than the ones who had studied there during the Ptolemaic Period. Eventually, the word "Alexandrian" itself came to be synonymous with the editing of texts, correction of textual errors, and writing of commentaries synthesized from those of earlier scholars—in other words, taking on connotations of pedantry, monotony, and lack of originality. Mention of both the Great Library of Alexandria and the Mouseion that housed it disappears after the middle of the third century AD. The last known references to scholars being members of the Mouseion date to the 260s.

In 272 AD, the emperor Aurelian fought to recapture the city of Alexandria from the forces of the Palmyrene queen Zenobia. During the course of the fighting, Aurelian's forces destroyed the Broucheion quarter of the city in which the main library was located. If the Mouseion and Library still existed at this time, they were almost certainly destroyed or damaged during the attack. If they did survive the attack, whatever was left of them would have been further damaged or destroyed during the emperor Diocletian's siege of Alexandria in 297, when the Brouchion quarter was again destroyed.

=== Arabic sources on the Arab conquest ===
In 642 AD, Alexandria was captured by an Arab army under the command of Amr ibn al-As. Several later Arabic sources describe the library's destruction by the order of Caliph Omar. The earliest was al-Qifti, who described the story in a biographical dictionary, History of Learned Men, written before 1248. Bar-Hebraeus, writing in the thirteenth century, quotes Umar as saying to Yaḥyā al-Naḥwī (who died 72 years prior to the siege): "If those books are in agreement with the Quran, we have no need of them; and if these are opposed to the Quran, destroy them." So, Ibn al-Qifti recounts, the general ordered that the books be burned to fuel the fires heating Alexandria's city baths. It is said that they were enough to provide heating for six months.

Later scholars, beginning with Father Eusèbe Renaudot in his 1713 translation of the History of the Patriarchs of Alexandria, are skeptical of these stories, given the amount of time that had passed before they were recorded and the political motivations of the various authors. Roy MacLeod, for example, points out that the story first appeared 500 years after the event, that John Philoponus was almost certainly dead by the time of the conquest of Egypt, and that both the Great Library of Alexandria and the Mouseion were likely long gone by then. According to Diana Delia, "Omar's rejection of pagan and Christian wisdom may have been devised and exploited by conservative authorities as a moral exemplum for Muslims to follow in later, uncertain times, when the devotion of the faithful was once again tested by proximity to nonbelievers". The historian Bernard Lewis suggests the myth came into existence during the reign of Saladin in order to justify the Sunni Ayyubid dynasty's breaking up of the Shia Fatimid Caliphate's collections and library at public auction.

== Successors to the Mouseion ==
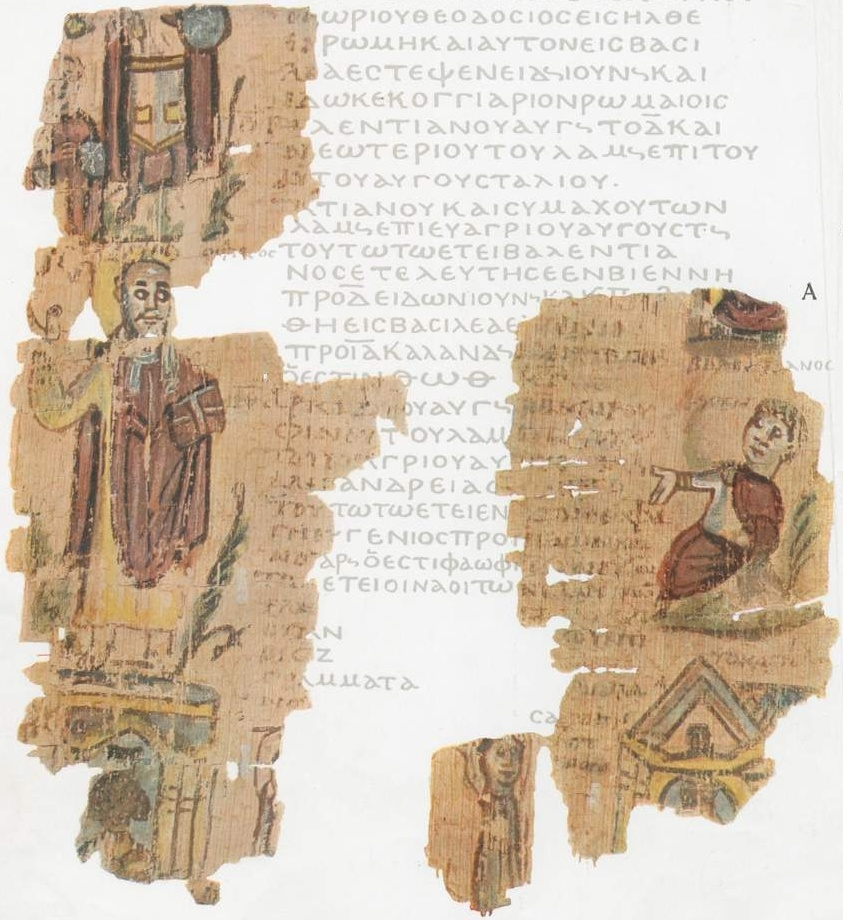
Drawing from the Alexandrian World Chronicle depicting Pope Theophilus I of Alexandria, gospel in hand, standing triumphantly atop the Serapeum in 391 AD

=== Serapeum ===
The Serapeum is often called the "Daughter Library" of Alexandria. For much of the late fourth century AD, it was probably the largest collection of books in the city of Alexandria. In the 370s and 380s, the Serapeum was still a major pilgrimage site for pagans. It remained a fully functioning temple and had classrooms for philosophers to teach in. It naturally tended to attract followers of Iamblichean Neoplatonism. Most of these philosophers were primarily interested in theurgy, the study of cultic rituals and esoteric religious practices. The Neoplatonist philosopher Damascius (fl. c. 458–after 538) records that a man named Olympus came from Cilicia to teach at the Serapeum, where he enthusiastically taught his students the rules of traditional divine worship and ancient religious practices. He enjoined his students to worship the old gods in traditional ways, and he may have even taught them theurgy.

Scattered references indicate that, sometime in the fourth century, an institution known as the "Mouseion" may have been reestablished at a different location somewhere in Alexandria. Nothing, however, is known about the characteristics of this organization. It may have possessed some bibliographic resources, but whatever they may have been, they were clearly not comparable to those of its predecessor.

Under the Christian rule of Roman emperor Theodosius I, pagan rituals were outlawed and pagan temples were destroyed. In 391 AD, the bishop of Alexandria, Theophilus, supervised the destruction of an old mithraeum. They gave some of the cult objects to Theophilus, who had them paraded through the streets to be mocked and ridiculed. The pagans of Alexandria were incensed by this act of desecration, especially the teachers of Neoplatonic philosophy and theurgy at the Serapeum. The teachers at the Serapeum took up arms and led their students and other followers in a guerrilla attack on the Christian population of Alexandria, killing many of them before being forced to retreat. In retaliation, the Christians vandalized and demolished the Serapeum, although some parts of the colonnade were still standing as late as the twelfth century. Whether an actual library still existed at this point, and if so how extensive it was, is not recorded. Jonathan Theodore has stated that by 391/392 AD, there was "no remaining 'Great Library' in the sense of the iconic vast, priceless collection". Only Orosius explicitly mentions the destruction of books or scrolls; sources probably written after the Serapeum's destruction speak of its collection of literature in the past tense. On the other hand, a recent article identifies the literary evidence suggesting that the original Ptolemaic library collection was moved to the Serapeum by the end of the second century AD and that a library is attested there until the Serapeum was destroyed along with the books it contained.

=== School of Theon and Hypatia ===
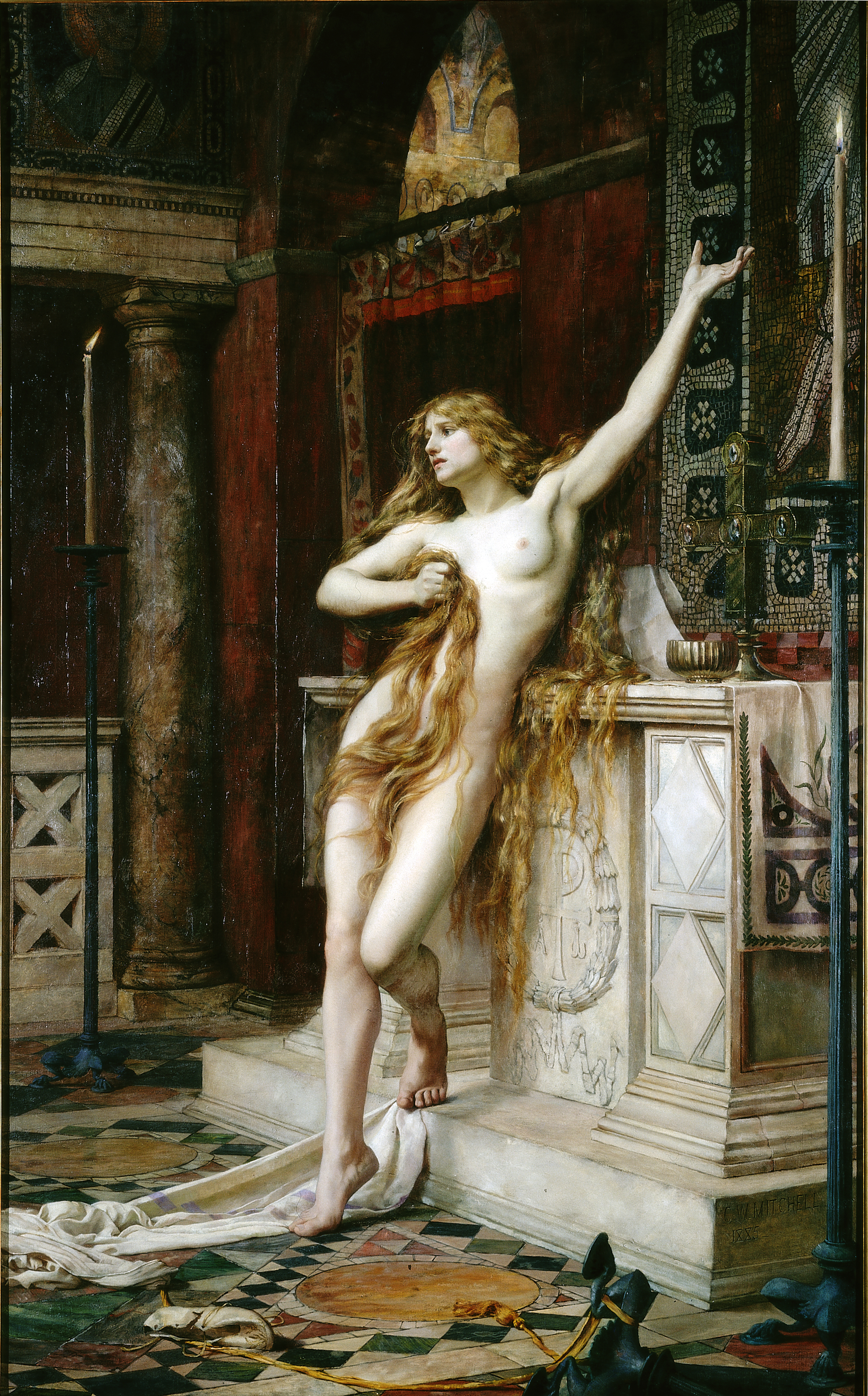
Hypatia (1885) by Charles William Mitchell, believed to be a depiction of a scene in Charles Kingsley's 1853 novel Hypatia

The Suda, a tenth-century Byzantine encyclopedia, calls the mathematician Theon of Alexandria (c. 335 – c. 405) a "man of the Mouseion". According to classical historian Edward J. Watts, however, Theon was probably the head of a school called the "Mouseion", which was named in emulation of the Hellenistic Mouseion that had once included the Library of Alexandria, but which had little other connection to it. Theon's school was exclusive, highly prestigious, and doctrinally conservative. Theon does not seem to have had any connections to the militant Iamblichean Neoplatonists who taught in the Serapeum. Instead, he seems to have rejected the teachings of Iamblichus and may have taken pride in teaching a pure, Plotinian Neoplatonism. In around 400 AD, Theon's daughter Hypatia (b. c. 350 – c. 370; d. 415) succeeded him as the head of his school. Like her father, she rejected the teachings of Iamblichus and instead embraced the original Neoplatonism formulated by Plotinus.

Theophilus, the bishop involved in the destruction of the Serapeum, tolerated Hypatia's school and even encouraged two of her students to become bishops in territory under his authority. Hypatia was extremely popular with the people of Alexandria and exerted profound political influence. Theophilus respected Alexandria's political structures and raised no objection to the close ties Hypatia established with Roman prefects. Hypatia was later implicated in a political feud between Orestes, the Roman prefect of Alexandria, and Cyril of Alexandria, Theophilus's successor as bishop. Rumors spread accusing her of preventing Orestes from reconciling with Cyril, and, in March of 415 AD, she was murdered by a mob of Christians, led by a lector named Peter. She had no successor, and her school collapsed after her death.

=== Later schools and libraries in Alexandria ===
Nonetheless, Hypatia was not the last pagan in Alexandria, nor was she the last Neoplatonist philosopher. Neoplatonism and paganism both survived in Alexandria and throughout the eastern Mediterranean for centuries after her death. British Egyptologist Charlotte Booth notes that many new academic lecture halls were built in Alexandria at Kom El Deka shortly after Hypatia's death, indicating that philosophy was clearly still taught in Alexandrian schools. The late-fifth-century writers Zacharias Scholasticus and Aeneas of Gaza both speak of the "Mouseion" as occupying some kind of physical space. Archaeologists have identified lecture halls dating to around this time period, located near, but not on, the site of the Ptolemaic Mouseion, which may be the "Mouseion" to which these writers refer.

== Collection ==
It is not possible to determine the collection's size in any era with certainty. Papyrus scrolls constituted the collection, and although codices were used after 300 BC, the Alexandrian Library is never documented as having switched to parchment, perhaps because of its strong links to the papyrus trade. The Egyptians eventually declared an embargo on papyrus exports to starve the competing Library of Pergamum of the materials it needed to produce scrolls in the hopes of solidifying the Library of Alexandria as the greatest collection of knowledge in the world. This spawned a popular myth that the Library of Alexandria indirectly spurred the Kingdom of Pergamum to create parchment, but parchment use in Anatolia and Egypt was detailed throughout both regions well before their respective libraries were built. However, the Kingdom of Pergamum is generally seen as responsible for major developments in producing a superior form of animal-skin parchment compared to preceding examples. And as a more robust material than papyrus, parchment worked well to disseminate information through Asia and the Roman Empire and was more likely to survive than papyrus.

A single piece of writing might occupy several scrolls, and this division into self-contained "books" was a major aspect of editorial work. King Ptolemy II Philadelphus (309–246 BC) is said to have set 500,000 scrolls as an objective for the library. The library's index, Callimachus' Pinakes, has only survived in the form of a few fragments, and it is not possible to know with certainty how large and how diverse the collection may have been. At its height, the library was said to possess nearly half a million scrolls. Although historians debate the precise number, high estimates claim 400,000 or even 700,000 scrolls, while the most conservative estimates are as low as 40,000, which is still an enormous collection that required vast storage space.

As a research institution, the library filled its stacks with new works in mathematics, astronomy, physics, natural sciences, and other subjects. Its empirical standards were applied in one of the first and certainly strongest homes for serious textual criticism. As the same text often existed in several different versions, comparative textual criticism was crucial for ensuring their veracity. Once ascertained, canonical copies would then be made for scholars, royalty, and wealthy bibliophiles all over the world, this commerce bringing income to the library.

== Legacy ==
=== In antiquity ===
The Library of Alexandria was one of the largest and most prestigious libraries of the ancient world, but it was far from the only one. By the end of the Hellenistic Period, almost every city in the Eastern Mediterranean had a public library and so did many medium-sized towns. During the Roman Period, the number of libraries only proliferated. By the fourth century AD, there were at least two dozen public libraries in the city of Rome alone. As the Library of Alexandria declined, centers of academic excellence arose in various other capital cities. It is possible most of the material from the Library of Alexandria survived, by way of the Imperial Library of Constantinople, the Academy of Gondishapur, and the House of Wisdom. Many were eventually gradually transmitted to Europe from the 12th century onward.

In late antiquity, as the Roman Empire became Christianized, Christian libraries modeled directly on the Library of Alexandria and other great libraries of earlier pagan times began to be founded all across the Greek-speaking eastern part of the empire. Among the largest and most prominent of these libraries were the Theological Library of Caesarea Maritima, the Library of Jerusalem, and a Christian library in Alexandria. These libraries held both pagan and Christian writings side-by-side and Christian scholars applied to the Christian scriptures the same philological techniques that the scholars of the Library of Alexandria had used for analyzing the Greek classics. Nonetheless, the study of pagan authors remained secondary to the study of the Christian scriptures until the Renaissance.

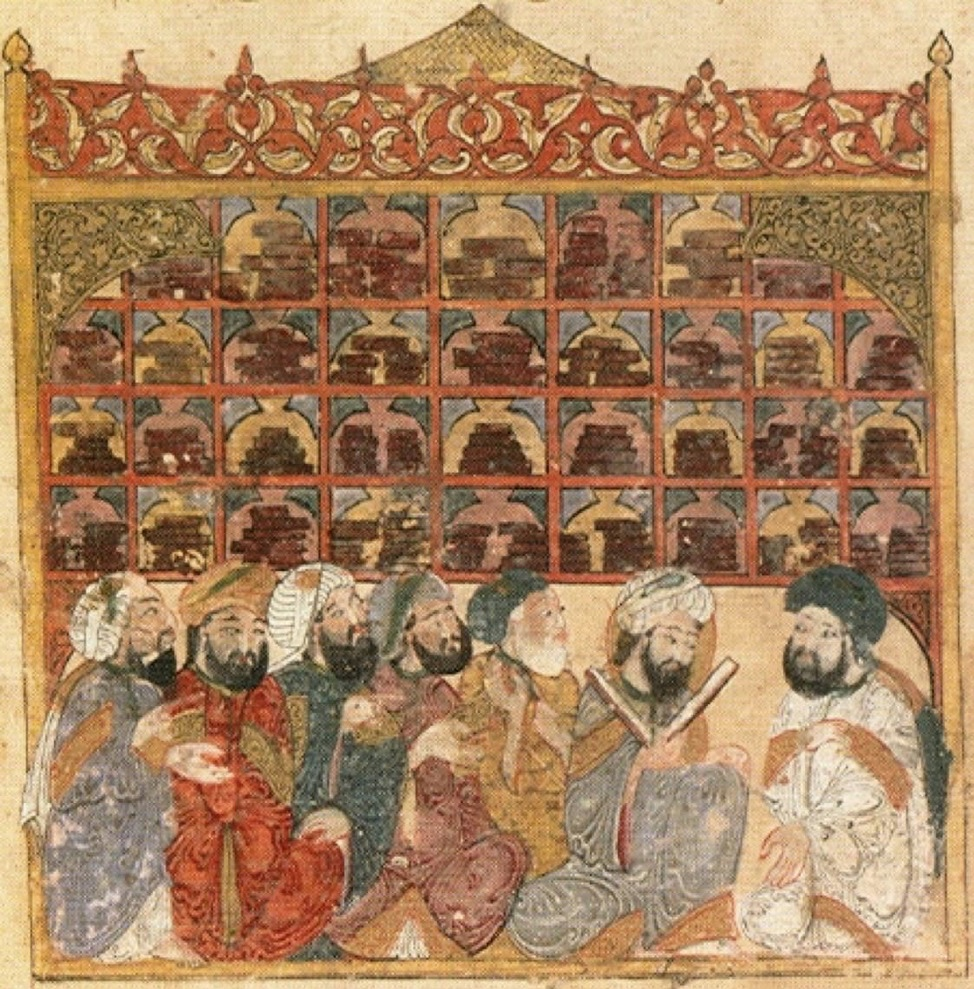
Illustration by Yahyá al-Wasiti from 1237 depicting scholars at an Abbasid library in Baghdad

The survival of ancient texts owes a great deal to the fact that they were exhaustingly copied and recopied. At first, they were copied by professional scribes during the Roman period. Mediaeval Muslim scholars also played a crucial role in preserving and translating the knowledge of the ancient world. The Graeco-Arabic translation movement translated a significant number of ancient texts into Arabic, keeping the texts intact and preserving them. Later, they were translated and re-introduced to Europe. This movement began in earnest under the Abbasid Caliphate where it played a significant role in the Islamic Golden Age. The translation movement encompassed scholars of various religions in the Abbasid empire. For example, under the patronage of Caliph al-Ma'mun, a Christian scholar and translator named Hunayn ibn Ishaq completed major translation projects of Aristotle, Hypocrates, and Galen so that they remained accessible to scholars. These translations were translated into Latin and re-introduced to Europe. These texts were copied by monks during Middle Ages and Renaissance, making them more easily available to European scholars once more.

=== Modern library: Bibliotheca Alexandrina ===
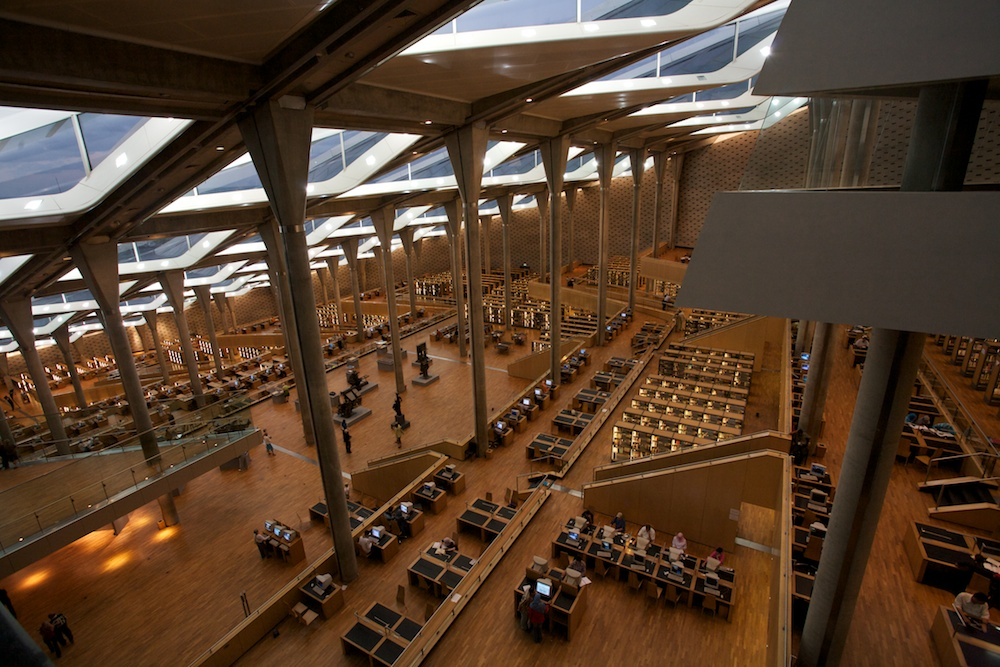
Interior of the modern Bibliotheca Alexandrina

The idea of reviving the ancient Library of Alexandria in the modern era was first proposed in 1974, after Lotfy Dowidar was president of the University of Alexandria. In May 1986, Egypt requested the executive board of UNESCO to allow the international organization to conduct a feasibility study for the project. This marked the beginning of UNESCO and the international community's involvement in trying to bring the project to fruition. Starting in 1988, UNESCO and the UNDP worked to support the international architectural competition to design the Library. Egypt devoted four hectares of land for the building of the Library and established the National High Commission for the Library of Alexandria. Egyptian president Hosni Mubarak took a personal interest in the project, which greatly contributed to its advancement. An international architectural competition took place in 1989 with Norwegian architectural firm Snøhetta winning the competition. Completed in 2002, the Bibliotheca Alexandrina now functions as a modern library and cultural center, commemorating the original Library of Alexandria. In line with the mission of the Great Library of Alexandria, the Bibliotheca Alexandrina also houses the International School of Information Science, a school for students preparing for highly specialized post-graduate degrees, whose goal is to train professional staff for libraries in Egypt and across the Middle East.

== See also ==
- Book burning
- Imperial Library of Constantinople
- List of destroyed libraries
- Załuski Library – the oldest modern public library
