= Aristarchus of Samothrace =

Greek grammarian and scholar (c. 220 – c. 143 BC)

Aristarchus
- Ἀρίσταρχος
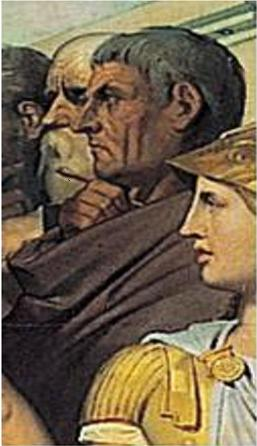
- Aristarchus of Samothrace, detail from: Apotheosis of Homer (1827) by Jean Auguste Dominique Ingres
- Born: c. 220 BC
- Died: c. 143 BC (aged c. 77); Egypt

Aristarchus of Samothrace (Ancient Greek: Ἀρίσταρχος ὁ Σαμόθραξ, romanized: Aristarchos o Samothrax; c. 220 – c. 143 BC) was an ancient Greek grammarian, noted as the most influential of all scholars of Homeric poetry. He was the head librarian of the Library of Alexandria and seems to have succeeded his teacher Aristophanes of Byzantium in that role.

== Life ==
Aristarchus left the island of Samothrace at a young age and went to Alexandria, where he studied with the director of the library. Later, he was a teacher at the royal courtyard, and then director of the library from 153 to 145 BC. After he was persecuted by his disciple Ptolemy the Benefactor, he found refuge in Cyprus, where he died.

It is said that Aristarchus had a remarkable memory and was completely indifferent as to his external appearance.

Accounts of his death vary, though they agree that it was during the persecutions of Ptolemy VIII of Egypt. In one account, he contracted an incurable dropsy and starved himself to death while in exile on Cyprus.

== Work ==
=== Homeric poems ===
He established the most historically important critical edition of the Homeric poems, and he is said to have applied his teacher's accent system to it, pointing the texts with a careful eye for metrical correctness. His rejection of doubtful lines made his severity proverbial. It is likely that he, or more probably, another predecessor at Alexandria, Zenodotus, was responsible for the division of the Iliad and Odyssey into twenty-four books each.

=== Other works ===
According to the Suda, Aristarchus wrote 800 treatises (ὑπομνήματα hypomnemata) on various topics; these are all lost but for fragments preserved in the various scholia. His works cover such writers as Alcaeus, Anacreon, Pindar, Hesiod, and the tragedians.

=== Punctation ===
He modified the system of the ancient Greek textual signs (semeia) and from some point on these signs were called Aristarchian symbols. The historical connection of his name to literary criticism has created the term aristarch for someone who is a judgmental critic.

== See also ==
- Homeric scholarship

| Preceded by Apollonius Eidographus | Head of the Library of Alexandria | Succeeded by ? |
