= Zenodotus =

3rd century BC Greek grammarian

Zenodotus (Ancient Greek: Ζηνόδοτος) was a Greek grammarian, literary critic, Homeric scholar, and the first librarian of the Library of Alexandria. (Note: There appear to have been at least two other grammarians of the same name: 1. Zenodotus of Alexandria, surnamed ὁ ἐν ἄστει (ho en astei, "the one from the city", i.e. Alexandria); 2. Zenodotus of Mallus, the disciple of Crates, who like his master attacked Aristarchus of Samothrace) A native of Ephesus and a pupil of Philitas of Cos, he lived during the reigns of the first two Ptolemies, and was at the height of his reputation about 280 BC.

== Biography ==
Zenodotus was the first superintendent of the Library of Alexandria and the first critical editor (διορθωτής diorthōtes) of Homer. In 284 BC, the Ptolemaic court appointed Zenodotus as the first Director of the library and also the official tutor to the royal children. His colleagues in the librarianship were Alexander of Aetolia and Lycophron of Chalcis, to whom were allotted the tragic and comic writers respectively, Homer and other epic poets being assigned to Zenodotus.

== Work ==
Although he has been reproached with arbitrariness and insufficient knowledge of Greek, his recension undoubtedly laid a sound foundation for future criticism. Having collated the different manuscripts in the library, he expunged or obelized doubtful verses, transposed or altered lines, and introduced new readings. It is probable that he was responsible for the division of the Homeric poems into twenty-four books each, and possibly was the author of the calculation of the days of the Iliad in the Tabula Iliaca.

=== Homeric glosses ===
He does not appear to have written any regular commentary on Homer, but his Homeric γλῶσσαι (glōssai, "lists of unusual words, glosses") probably formed the source of the explanations of Homer attributed by the grammarians to Zenodotus. He also lectured upon Hesiod, Anacreon and Pindar, if he did not publish editions of them. He is further called an epic poet by the Suda, and three epigrams in the Greek Anthology are assigned to him.

=== Library organisation ===
==== Classification ====
In addition to his other scholarly work, Zenodotus introduced a library classification system on the materials in the Library of Alexandria whereby texts were assigned to different rooms based on their subject matter (verse or prose, literary or scientific), and the various sub-classifications within each.

==== Ordering ====
Within their subjects, Zenodotus organized the works alphabetically by the first letter of the name of their author. The principle of the alphabetic organization was introduced by Zenodotus.

==== Tagging ====
In addition, library staff attached a small tag to the end of each scroll. These tags gave authors' names as well as other identification and had been added during the accessions procedure but often without a title; many a roll contained more than one work, and many works, such as compilations of poetry, warranted more than a single title. When a title was lacking, Zenodotus had to unroll and pass an eye over the text. Such tags enabled the scrolls to be easily returned to the area in which they had been classified and also ensured that library users did not have to unroll each scroll in order to see what it contained. This was the first recorded use of metadata, a landmark in library history. Not until the second century A.D. does fuller alphabetization make an appearance.

== See also ==
- Alexandrine grammarians
- Homeric scholarship

== Notes ==
New title	Head of the Library of Alexandria	Succeeded by Apollonius of Rhodes
