= Homeric scholarship =

Study of any Homeric topic, especially the Iliad and Odyssey

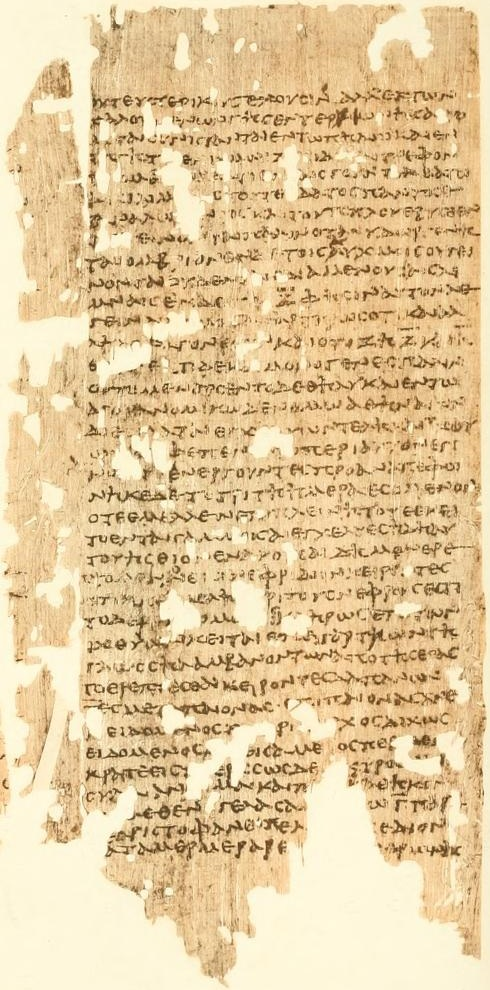
Papyrus Oxyrhynchus 221, showing scholia from Iliad XXI

Homeric scholarship is the study of any Homeric topic, especially the two large surviving epics, the Iliad and Odyssey. It is currently part of the academic discipline of classical studies. The subject is one of the oldest in education.

== Ancient scholarship ==
=== Scholia ===
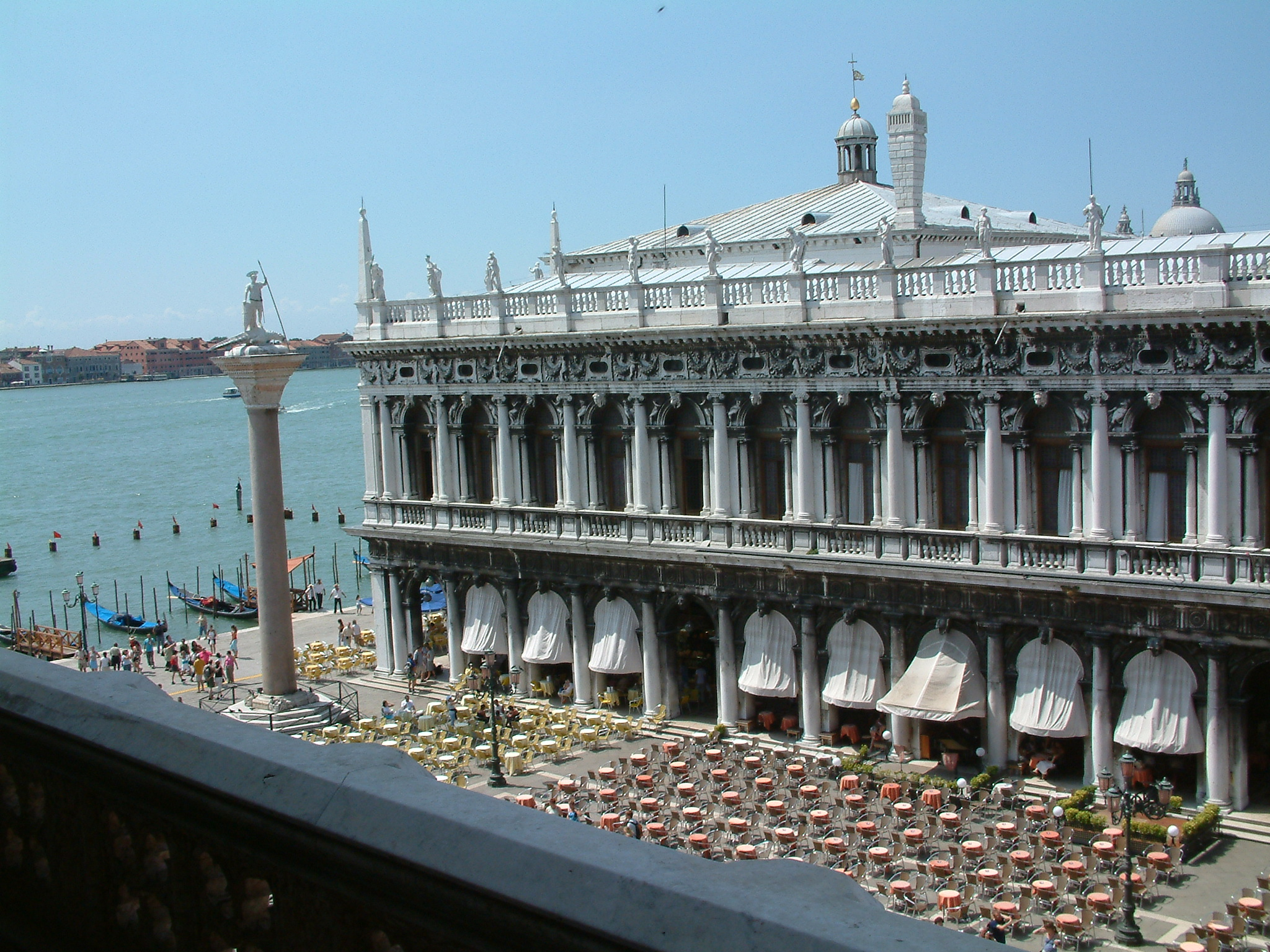
Library of St. Mark's, Venice, home of Venetus A.

Scholia are ancient commentaries, preserved in the margins of manuscripts. The term marginalia includes them. Some are interlinear, written in very small characters. Over time the scholia were copied along with the work. When the copyist ran out of free text space, he listed them on separate pages or in separate works. The works of Homer have been heavily annotated since antiquity.

The number of manuscripts of the Iliad is currently (2014) approximately 1800. The papyri of the Odyssey are fewer in number but are still in the order of dozens. The inventory is incomplete, and new finds continue to be made, but not all these texts contain scholia. No compendium has collated all of the Homeric scholia.

Following the principle of economy for the allocation of scarce publication space to overwhelming numbers of scholia, the compilers have had to make decisions about what is important enough to compile. Certain types have been distinguished; scholia have lines of descent of their own. Eleanor Dickey summarizes the most important three, identified by letter as A, bT, and D.

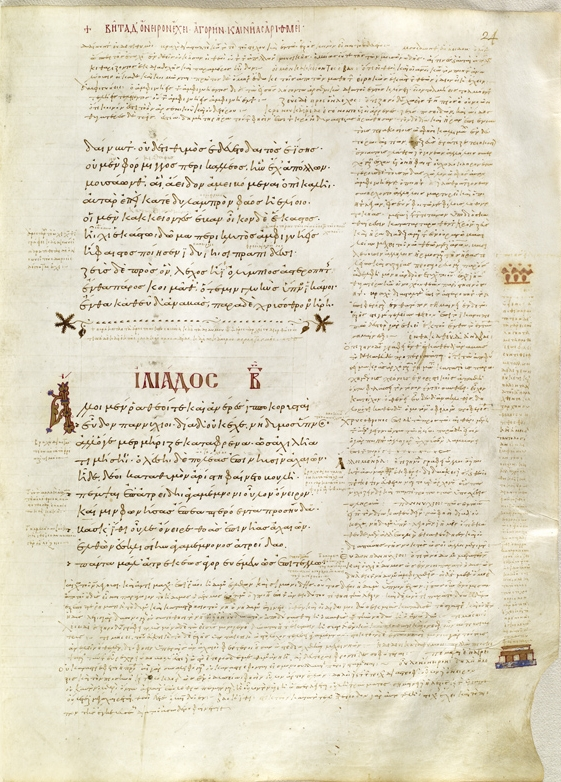
Venetus A

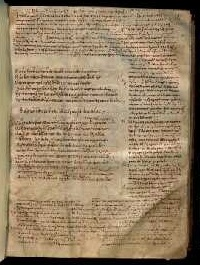
Venetus B

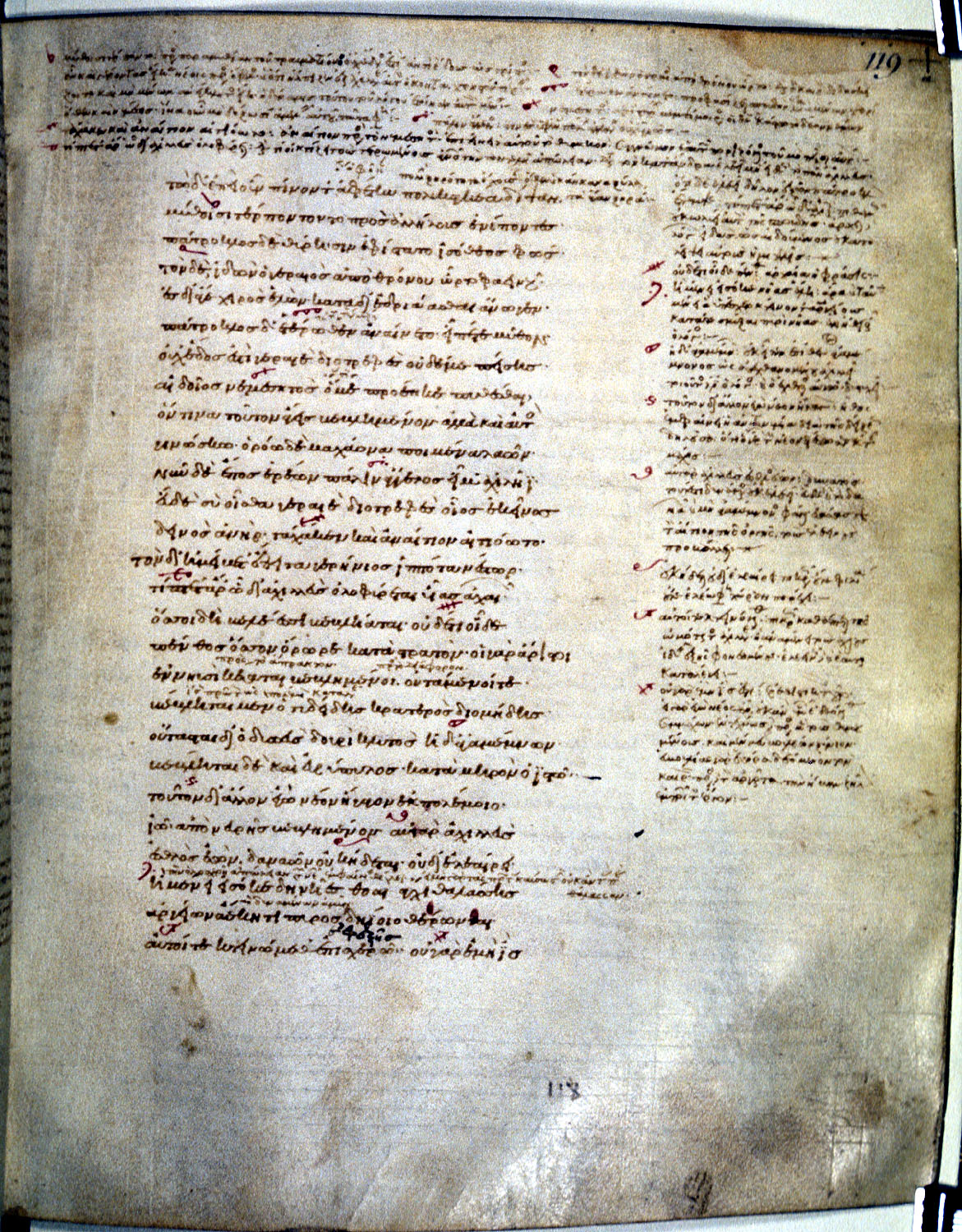
Townleyanus

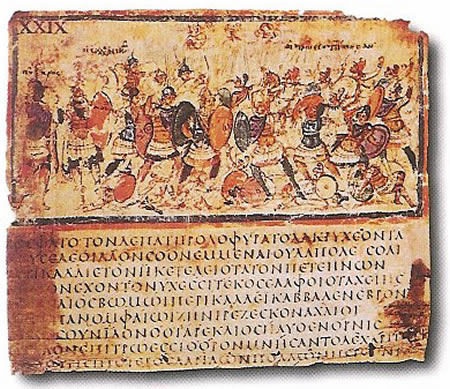
Ambrosian Iliad

Folios from four complete manuscripts of the Iliad

A, "the Venetian scholia", are the scholia of Venetus A, a major manuscript of the Iliad, dated to the 10th century, and located in the Biblioteca Marciana (Library of St. Mark's) of Venice. The sources of the scholia are noted at the end of each book. There are basically four. The hypothetical original text of the scholia, a manuscript of the 4th century CE, is therefore called, in German, the Viermännerkommentar (VMK), "four-man commentary", where the men are Aristonicus, Didymus, Herodian, and Nicanor. Their comments, and these scholia, are termed "critical". A-scholia are found in other manuscripts as well. Venetus A contains some bT scholia.

The bT-scholia have come down to us through two sources: the 11th century T, the "Townleian" scholia, so designated because the manuscript, Townleyanus, was once in the collection of Lord Townley, and a lost manuscript, b, whose descendants include the manuscript known as Venetus B. The bT manuscripts descend from an earlier manuscript, c. The bT-scholia are termed exegetical, as opposed to critical.

The D scholia, or scholia Didymi, named erroneously for Didymus, are the earliest and largest group. They occur primarily in the 9th century Z manuscript (Rome, Biblioteca Nazionale), and the 11th century Q manuscript, but also in some others, such as A and T. The D scholia were once thought to be the work of the 1st century BCE scholar Didymus; they are now known to go back to 5th and 4th century BCE school manuscripts, pre-dating the Alexandrine tradition, and representing “the oldest surviving stratum of Homeric scholarship.” Some are also called the scholia minora and the scholia vulgata, the former name referring to the short length of many. These are glossaries. Among the non-minor scholia are mythological (allegorical) aetia, plots, and paraphrases, explaining the meanings of obscure words.

The order of precedence and chronological order of these Iliad scholia is D, A, bT, and other. Material in them probably ranges from the 5th century BCE (the D scholia) to as late as the 7th or 8th century CE (the latest bT scholia). The same scheme applies to the Odyssey, except that A scholia, mainly of the Iliad, are in deficit. There are no printed works publishing all the scholia on the Iliad and Odyssey. Only partial publications according to various principles have been possible.

The first was that of Janus Lascaris in 1517, containing the D-scholia. Some subsequent works concentrate on manuscripts or parts of them, others on type of scholia, and still others on books of the Iliad, or source. Larger compendia are relatively recent. One that has already become a standard is the 7-volume compendium of A- and bT-scholia by Hartmut Erbse. Volumes 1–5 are reserved for a number of books of the Iliad each, amounting to some 3000 pages, approximately. The last two volumes are indices. And yet, Dickey says of it. “The seven volumes of Erbse’s edition thus represent only a small fraction of all the preserved scholia ...,” from which it can be seen that the opinions, elucidations and emendations to the Iliad and Odyssey in manuscript texts far outweigh those texts in numbers of pages.

=== Classical scholarship ===
By the Classical Period the Homeric Question had advanced to the point of trying to determine what works were attributable to Homer. The Iliad and the Odyssey were beyond question. They were considered to have been written by Homer. The D-scholia suggest that they were taught in the schools; however, the language was no longer self-evident. The extensive glossaries of the D-scholia were intended to bridge the gap between the spoken language and Homeric Greek.

The poems themselves contradicted the general belief in the existence and authorship of Homer. There were many variants, which there should not have been according to the single-author conviction. The simplest answer was to decide which of the variants was most likely to represent a presumed authentic original composition and to discount the others as spurious, devised by someone else.

==== Peisistratean edition ====
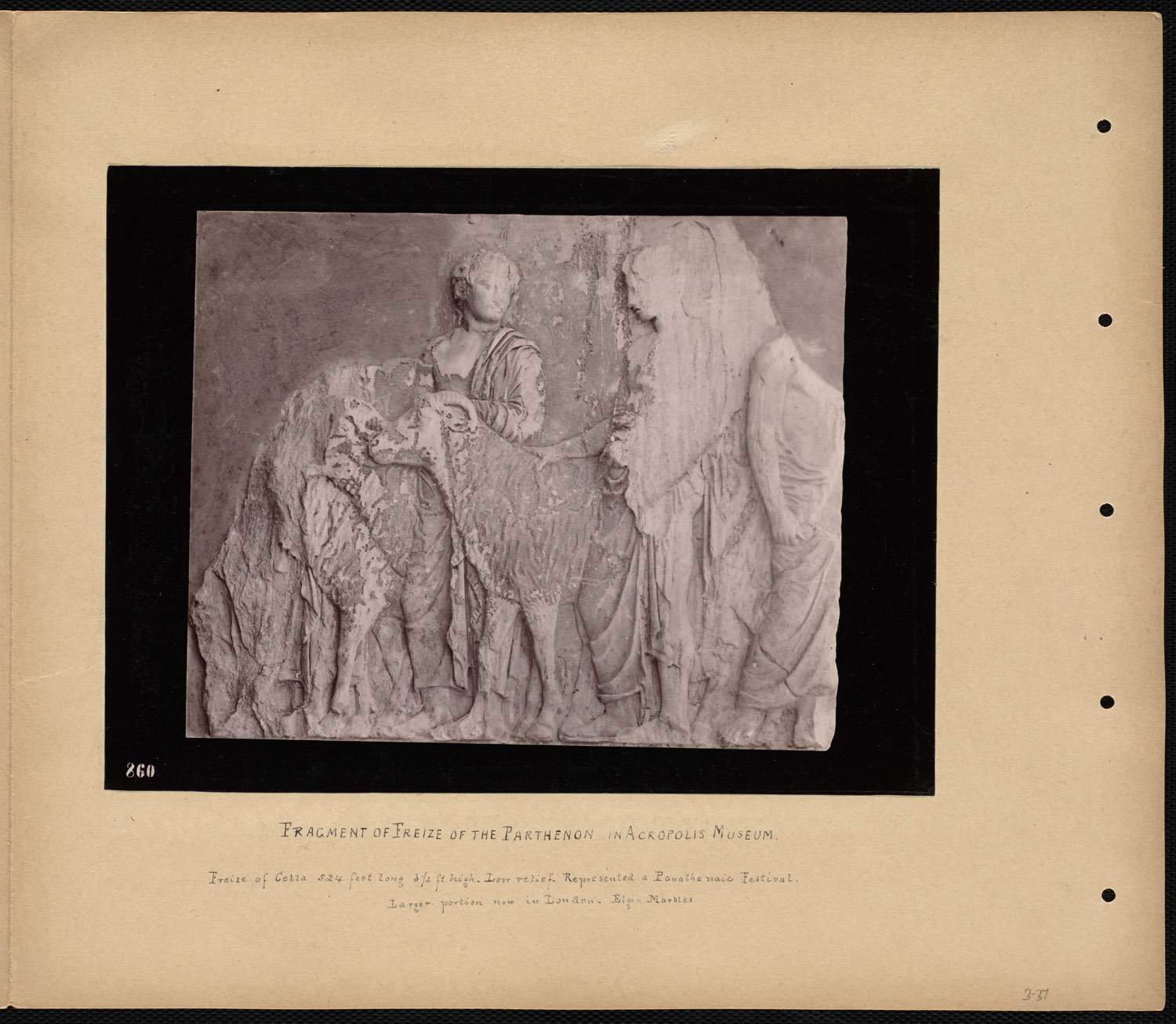
Part of the Parthenon Frieze, depicting the Panathenaic Festival. Elgin marble, located in the British Museum.

Strabo reports an account by Hereas accusing Peisistratos, tyrant of Athens, r. 561-527 BCE, or Solon (638-558 BCE), sometime eponymous archon and lawgiver, starting 594 BCE, of altering the Iliads Catalogue of Ships to place the 12 ships from Salamis in the Athenian camp, proving that Athens owned Salamis in the Trojan War. Others denied the theory, Strabo said. The story implies that Peisistratos or Solon had some authority over a presumed master text of the Iliad, and yet Athens at the time had little political power over the Aegean region. Strabo was not the only accuser. Plutarch also accuses him of moving a line from Hesiod to λ630 (Odyssey Book 11).

Diogenes Laërtius relates that in the time of Solon the Iliad was being “rhapsodized” (rhapsodeisthai) in public recitations. One of Solon's laws mandates that, in such performances, a rhapsode was to pick up where the previous left off. The involvement of a state official in these rhapsodizations can be explained by their being performances at state-sponsored sacred festivals.

Cicero says that previously the books of Homer were “confused” (confusos), but that Peisistratos “disposed” (disposuisse) them as they were then. A scholion on Iliad, Book K, in manuscript T, says that they were “arranged” (tetachthai) by Peisistratos into one poem. Apparently the impromptu composition of shorter poems on a known theme was forced into a continuous presentation by Solon, and edited by Peisistratos.

A number of other fragments testify to a written edition by Peisistratos, some credible, some not. A few mention the establishment of a Peisistratean school. In others, Hipparchus (son of Peisistratos) published the edition and passed a law that it must be read at the Panathenaic Games, which began in 566 BCE, before the tyranny of his father, from 561 BCE. Peisistratos was succeeded by his sons in 527 BCE.

==== Academic connection ====
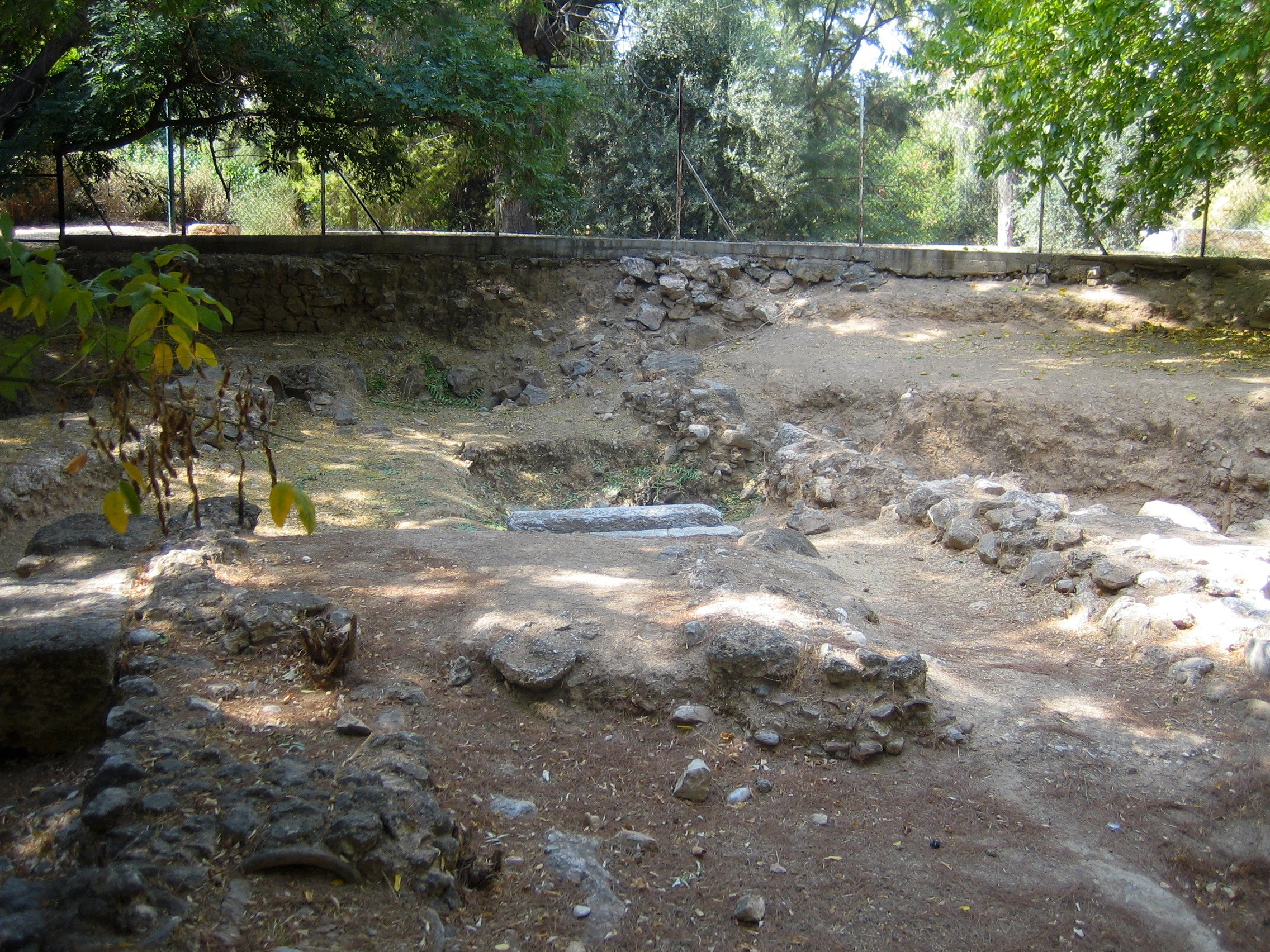
Site of the Academy in Athens.

According to Monro, based on Ludwich, Plato is the most prolific quoter of Homer, with 209 lines. Next most is Aristotle, with 93 lines. Of the 209, only two differ from the Vulgate, in Iliad Book IV, which Ludwich termed Kontaminiert, “corrupted.” Several were marked as spurious (Ludwich's aufser) by the Alexandrians. There was only one instance of four lines not in the Vulgate (Ludwich's Zusatzversen), From Iliad IV. Monro asserts “... whatever interpolated texts of Homer were then current, the copy from which Plato quoted was not one of them.” Aristotle's quotations do not have the same purity, which is surprising. For about 20 years they were at the same school, the Platonic Academy.

The Platonic view of Homer is exceptional for the times. Homer and Hesiod were considered to have written myths as allegory. According to J.A. Stewart, "… Homer is an Inspired Teacher, and must not be banished from the curriculum. If we get beneath the literal meaning, we find him teaching the highest truth." In the Republic, however, Plato denies that children can distinguish literal and allegorical truth and advocates censoring the myth-makers, including Homer. The Republic expresses a concept of a society established according to the Platonic ideal, in which every aspect is monitored and controlled under the guidance of a philosopher-king drafted from ascetic poverty for the purpose. It was not a popular view.

==== Peripatetic connection ====
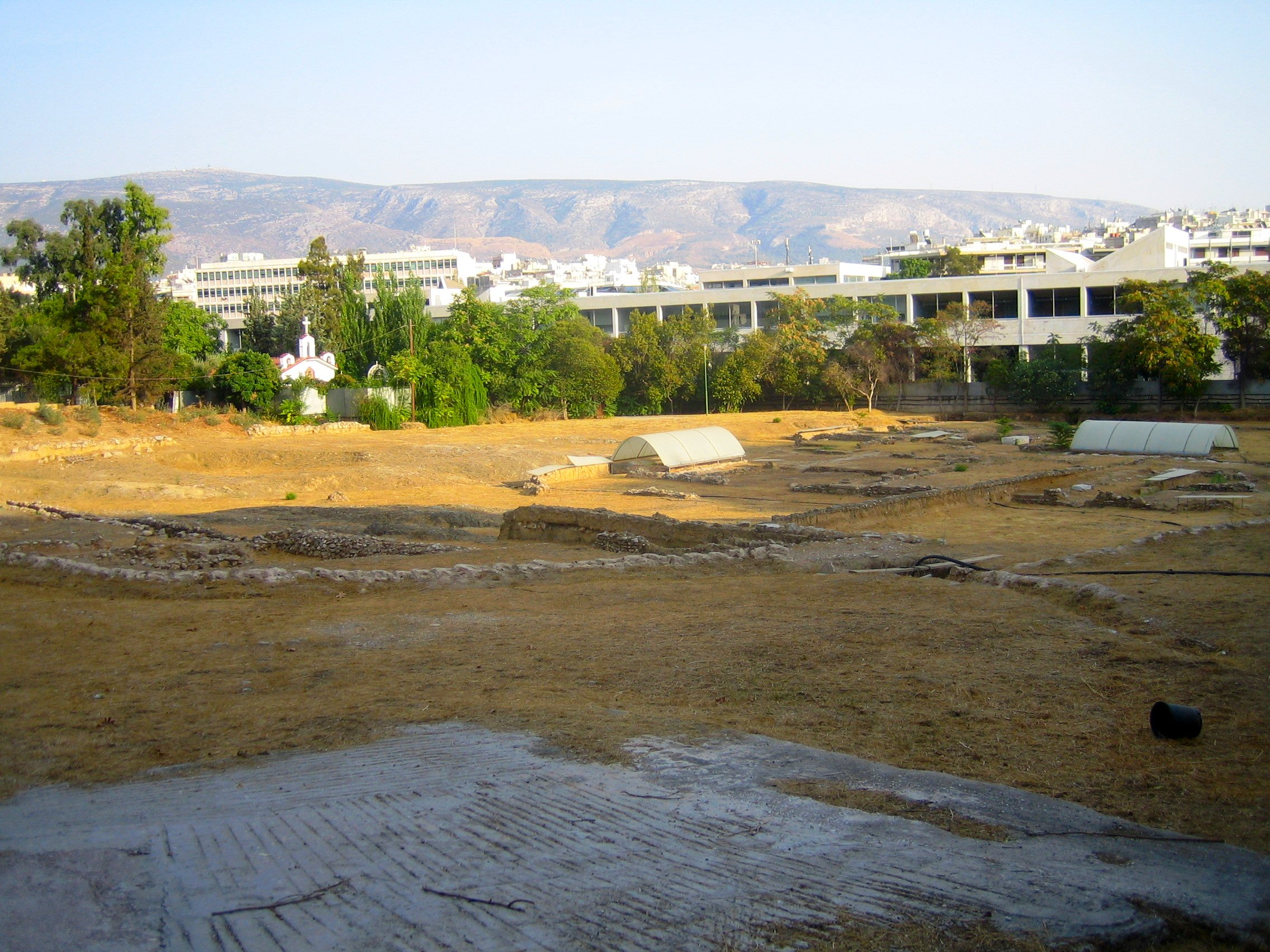
Site of the Lyceum in Athens.

The archetype of Hellenistic libraries was that of the Lyceum in classical Athens. Its founder, Aristotle, had been a student, and then an associate, at Plato’s Academy. He was Plato’s star student, but as a metic, or resident foreigner (he was still Greek), he could not own property or sponsor the other metics. Consequently, after the death of Plato, not having been appointed director, he departed Athens for an educational opportunity in Mysia, which fell through when Mysia was captured by the Persians. He was subsequently hired by his boyhood companion, now Philip II of Macedon, to tutor the latter’s teen-age son, the future Alexander the Great, on whose behalf he built a school, the Nymphaeum, at Mieza.

Alexander became an enthusiastic member of Aristotle’s inner circle. Immediate association was terminated within a few years when Alexander assumed the duties of monarch after the assassination of his father in 336/335. His main duty was to lead a planned invasion of the east to settle the rivalry with Persia. During it he kept by his bedside a manuscript of Homer personally emended by Aristotle, a gift of the latter. He later placed it in an expensive casket captured from the Persian king, Darius, from which it was called "the Casket Homer". The anecdote, if true, reveals a belief by Aristotle's circle in an authentic text, as well as editorial activity to recapture it. Alexander was a Homer enthusiast.

Aristotle's approach to Homer and statesmanship was different from Plato's. Politics and Poetry were two of his research topics. His theoretical treatise, Politics is not a presentation, like Plato's, of an ideal state according to some philosophy, but is a presentation and classification of real states as they were then, discovered by research. Similarly, Homer does not play a role in any censorial evaluation of Aristotle as a critic, but appears in a professional study of poetry, the Poetics, with regard to the difficulty with some of his language. Aristotle's main study of Homer did not survive. It is listed in Diogenes Laërtius' Life of Aristotle as "Six books of Homeric problems".

Of the 93 quotations, Mitchell Carroll says: “Aristotle’s hearty veneration for Homer is shown by the numerous citations of the Iliad and the Odyssey in his works, and by the frequent expressions of admiration occurring in the Poetics; ….”, Despite this enthusiasm, Monro notes that the “poetical quotations are especially incorrect,” with regard to the errors and additional lines. This is not the expected result if Aristotle had received the pure edition from which Plato had quoted. Monro's solution is to adopt the view of Adolph Römer, that the errors can be attributed to Aristotle personally, and not to variant manuscripts. This was obviously not history's final verdict.

=== Hellenistic scholars and their aims ===
Many ancient Greek writers discussed topics and problems in the Homeric epics, but the development of scholarship per se revolved around three goals:

1. Analyzing internal inconsistencies within the epics;
2. Producing editions of the epics' authentic text, free of interpolations and errors;
3. Interpretation: both explaining archaic words, and exegetical interpretation of the epics as literature.

The first philosopher to focus intensively on the intellectual problems surrounding the Homeric epics was Zoilus of Amphipolis in the early 4th century BCE. His work Homeric Questions does not survive, but it seems that Zoilus enumerated and discussed inconsistencies of plot in Homer. Examples of this are numerous: for example, in Iliad 5.576-9 Menelaus kills a minor character, Pylaemenes, in combat; but later, at 13.758-9, he is still alive to witness the death of his son Harpalion. These have been humorously described as points where Homer "nodded off," from which comes the proverbial phrase "Homeric Nod." Aristotle's Homeric Problems, which does not survive, was probably a response to Zoilus.

Critical editions of Homer discuss three special steps in this process. First is the hypothetical "Peisistratean recension". There is a long-standing, but somewhat old-fashioned, tradition in modern scholarship which holds that in the mid-6th century BCE the Athenian tyrant Peisistratus had the Homeric epics compiled in a definitive edition. It is known that under Peisistratus, and later, rhapsodes competed in performing Homer at the Panathenaic festival; and a scholion on Iliad 10.1 accuses Peisistratus of inserting book 10 into the Iliad. But there is little evidence for a Peisistratean recension, and most present-day scholars doubt its existence; at the very least it is disputed what is to be understood by the term "recension". The second and third key moments are the critical editions made by the 3rd and 2nd century BCE Alexandrian scholars Zenodotus of Ephesus and Aristarchus respectively; both of these scholars also published numerous other works on Homer and other poets, none of which survive. Zenodotus' edition may well have been the first to divide the Iliad and Odyssey into 24 books.

Aristarchus' edition is probably the single most important moment in the whole history of Homeric scholarship. His text was more conservative than Zenodotus', but it became the standard edition of Homer for the ancient world, and almost everything in modern editions of Homer passed through Aristarchus' hands. Like Zenodotus, Aristarchus did not delete passages that he rejected, but (fortunately for us) preserved them with an annotation indicating his rejection. He developed Zenodotus' already sophisticated system of critical symbols to indicate specific kinds of issues with particular lines, and a significant proportion of the terminology is still in use today (obelus, athetising, etc.). From the scholia a great deal is known about his guiding principles, and those of other editors and commentators such as Zenodotus and Aristophanes of Byzantium. The chief preoccupations of the Alexandrian scholars may be summarised as follows:

1. Consistency of content: the reasoning is that internal inconsistencies imply that the text has been ineptly changed. This principle apparently pursues the work of Zoilus.
2. Consistency of style: anything that appears only once in Homer — an unusual poetic image, an unusual word (a hapax legomenon), or an unusual epithet (e.g. the epithet "Kyllenian Hermes" in Odyssey 24.1) — tends to be rejected.
3. No repetitions: if a line or passage is repeated word-for-word, one of the exemplars is often rejected. Zenodotus is known to have applied this principle rigidly, Aristarchus less so; it is in tension with the principle of "consistency of style" above.
4. Quality: Homer was regarded as the greatest of poets, so anything perceived to be poor poetry was rejected.
5. Logic: something that makes no sense (such as Achilleus nodding at his comrades as he goes running after Hektor) was not regarded as the product of the original artist.
6. Morality: Plato's insistence that a poet should be moral was taken to heart by Alexandrian scholars, and scholia accuse many passages and phrases of being "unsuitable" (οὐ πρέπον ou prepon); the real Homer, goes the reasoning, being a paragon of perfection, would never have written anything immoral himself.
7. Explaining Homer from Homer (Ὅμηρον ἐξ Ὁμήρου σαφηνίζειν): this motto is Aristarchus', and means simply that it is better to solve a problem in Homer using evidence from within Homer, rather than external evidence.

To a modern eye it is evident that these principles should be applied at most on an ad hoc basis. When they are applied across the board the results are frequently bizarre, especially as no account whatsoever is taken of poetic licence. However, it should be remembered that the reasoning seems persuasive when built up gradually, and then it is a very difficult mindset to escape: 19th century Analyst scholars (see below) adopted most of these criteria, and applied them even more stringently than the Alexandrians did.

It is also sometimes difficult to know what exactly the Alexandrians meant when they rejected a passage. The scholia on Odyssey 23.296 tell us that Aristarchus and Aristophanes regarded that line as the end of the epic (even though that is grammatically impossible); but we are also told that Aristarchus separately rejected several passages after that point.

=== Allegorical readings ===
Exegesis is also represented in the scholia. When the scholiasts turn to interpretation they tend to be most interested in explaining background material, e.g., reporting an obscure myth to which Homer alludes; but there was also a fashion for allegory, especially among the Stoics. The most notable passage is a scholion on Iliad 20.67, which gives an extended allegorical interpretation of the battle of the gods, explaining each god as symbolic of various elements and principles in conflict with one another, e.g., Apollo is opposed to Poseidon because fire is opposed to water.

Allegory is also represented in some surviving ancient monographs: the Homeric Allegories by an otherwise unknown 1st century BCE writer Heraclitus, the 2nd century CE Plutarch's On the Life and Poetry of Homer, and the works of the 3rd century CE Neoplatonist philosopher Porphyry, particularly his On the Cave of the Nymphs in the Odyssey and Homeric Questions. Many extracts from Porphyry are preserved in the scholia, especially the D scholia (although the current standard edition, that of Erbse, omits them).

Allegorical interpretation continued to be influential on Byzantine scholars such as Tzetzes and Eustathius. But allegorising non-allegorical literature has not been a fashionable activity since the Middle Ages; it is common to see modern scholars refer to such allegorising in the scholia as "inferior" or even "contemptible". As a result, these texts are now rarely read.

=== Homeric Criticism ===
Most Greek authors deeply admired Homer and often modeled their own works on his poetry. However, the Greeks were not inclined to accept any authority without question, and as a result, criticism of Homer emerged at an early stage. The earliest objections were based more on moral concerns than on literary evaluation. Because Homer's poems were widely used as educational texts, philosophers became concerned about the influence they might have on young readers. Later, literary critics expanded these objections by pointing to perceived flaws in style, grammar, and other technical aspects of his work.

Below is a list of notable ancient critics:

- Plato
- Xenophanes
- Heraclitus
- Zenodotus
- Aristarchus of Samothrace
- Zoilus
- Parthenius - An epigram by Erycius in the Greek Anthology serves as a mock epitaph for Parthenius, a poet who criticized Homer. Rather than honoring him after his death, the epitaph calls on passersby to pour pitch over his grave because he composed offensive and worthless poetry and insulted Homer by describing the Odyssey as "mud" and the Iliad as "a bramble". As punishment, Parthenius is imagined suffering eternally in the underworld, chained by the Furies in the river Cocytus and forced to wear a choking dog collar around his neck. Modern historians believe that the Parthenius referred to here is most likely Parthenius of Nicaea.
- Palaephatus was an early practitioner of ancient myth criticism who sought to rationalize Greek mythology. He argued that myths preserve memories of actual events that became distorted over time. Accordingly, his role as an exegete was to identify the ambiguous word, phrase, or event that allowed these distortions to arise. His On Unbelievable Tales includes rationalized accounts of many Greek myths, including those associated with Homeric tradition.

== 18th and 19th centuries ==
The 18th century saw major developments in Homeric scholarship, and also saw the opening phase of the discussion which was to dominate the 19th century (and, for some scholars, the 20th): the so-called "Homeric question". Homer was first seen as the product of his primitive time by the Scottish scholar Thomas Blackwell, in An Enquiry into the Life and Writings of Homer (1735).

Another major development was the enormous growth of linguistic study on Homer and the Homeric dialect. In 1732, Bentley published his discovery of the traces left in the text of Homer by the digamma, an archaic Greek consonant that was omitted in later, classical, Greek orthography. Bentley showed conclusively that the vast majority of metrical anomalies in Homeric verse could be attributed to the presence of digamma (though the idea was not well received at the time: Alexander Pope, for one, satirised Bentley). Important linguistic studies continued throughout the next two centuries alongside the endless arguments over the Homeric question, and the work by figures such as Buttmann and Monro is still worth reading today; and it was the linguistic work of Parry that set in motion a major paradigm shift in the mid-20th century. Another major 18th century development was Villoison's 1788 publication of the A and B scholia on the Iliad.

The Homeric question is essentially the question of the identity of the poet(s) of the Homeric epics, and the nature of the relationship between "Homer" and the epics. In the 19th century it came to be the fulcrum between two opposed schools of thought, the Analysts and the Unitarians. The issue came about in the context of 18th-century interest in popular lays and folktale, and the growing recognition that the Homeric epics must have been transmitted orally before being written down, possibly much later than "Homer" himself. The Italian philosopher Vico argued that the epics were the products not of an individual genius poet but rather the cultural products of an entire people; and Wood’s 1769 Essay on the Original Genius and Writings of Homer argued emphatically that Homer had been illiterate and the epics had been transmitted orally. (Less fortunately, Wood drew parallels between Homer and the poetry of the supposed Scottish oral poet Ossian, published by James Macpherson in 1765; Ossian turned out later to have been wholly invented by Macpherson.)

The scholar Friedrich August Wolf brought matters to a head. His review of Villoison's edition of the scholia acknowledged that they proved conclusively the oral transmission of the poems. In 1795, he published his Prolegomena ad Homerum, in which he argued that the poems were composed in the mid-10th century BCE; that they were transmitted orally; that they changed considerably after that time in the hands of bards performing them orally and editors adapting written versions to contemporary tastes; and that the poems' apparent artistic unity came about after their transcription. Wolf posed the perplexing question of what it would mean to restore the poems to their original, pristine, form.

In the wake of Wolf, two schools of thought coalesced to oppose one another: Analysts and Unitarians.

=== Analysts ===
19th-century Analysts argued that the epics were composed by many hands, a hodge-podge of interpolations and incompetent editing that concealed the original genius of Homer, or at the very least that the Iliad and Odyssey were composed by different poets. In this they followed in the steps of ancient scholars like Zoilus and the so-called "separatists" (χωρίζοντες chōrizontes, the best known of whom, Xenon and Hellanicus, are nonetheless very obscure figures).

Among Analysts, Hermann's 1832 De interpolationibus Homeri ("On interpolations in Homer") and 1840 De iteratis apud Homerum ("On repetitions in Homer") argued that the epics, as they now stood, were encrustations of second-rate later material around a pristine kernel: a hypothetical "Ur-Iliad". Conversely, Lachmann's 1847 Betrachtungen über Homers Ilias ("Studies on Homer's Iliad") argued that the Iliad was a compilation of 18 independent folk-lays, rather as the Finnish Kalevala actually was, compiled in the 1820s and 1830s by Lönnrot: so, he argued, Iliad book 1 consists of a lay on Achilleus' anger (lines 1-347), and two continuations, the return of Chryseis (430–492) and the scenes in Olympus (348-429, 493-611); book 2 is a separate lay, but containing several interpolations such as Odysseus' speech (278–332); and so on. (Lachmann also tried to apply Analyst principles to the mediaeval German Nibelungenlied.) Kirchhoff's 1859 edition of the Odyssey argued that the Ur-Odyssey had comprised just books 1, 5-9, and parts of 10-12, that a later phase had added most of books 13-23, and a third phase had added the bits about Telemachos, and book 24.

The climax of Analysis came with Wilamowitz, who published Homerische Untersuchungen ("Homeric studies") in 1884 and Die Heimkehr des Odysseus ("The homecoming of Odysseus") in 1927. The Odyssey, he argued, was compiled about 650 BCE or later from three separate poems by a Bearbeiter (editor). Subsequent Analysts often referred to the hypothesised Bearbeiter as the "B-poet" (and the original genius, Homer himself, was sometimes the "A-poet"). Wilamowitz' examination of the relationship between these three layers of the Odyssey, further complicated by later, minor, interpolations, is enormously detailed and complex. One of the three poems, the "old Odyssey" (most of books 5-14 and 17-19) had in turn been compiled by a Redaktor from three even earlier poems, two of which had originally been parts of longer poems. Like most other scholars caught up in the opposition between Analysis and Unitarianism, Wilamowitz equated poetry that he thought poor with late interpolations. But Wilamowitz set such a high standard in the sophistication of his analysis that 20th century Analysts seem to have found difficulty in moving forward from where Wilamowitz left off; and over the course of the following decades attention drifted away, particularly in the English-speaking world.

=== Unitarians ===
Nitzsch was the earliest scholar to oppose Wolf and argue that the two Homeric epics showed an artistic unity and intention that was the work of a single mind. Nitzsch's writings cover the years 1828 to 1862. In his Meletemata (1830) he took up the question of written versus unwritten literature, on which Wolf's whole argument had turned; and in his 1852 Die Sagenpoesie der Griechen ("The oral poetry of the Greeks") he investigated the structure of the Homeric poems and their relation to other, non-extant, epics which narrated the story of the Trojan War, the so-called Epic Cycle.

However, most Unitarian scholarship tended to be driven by literary interpretation and was therefore often more ephemeral. Even so, many scholars who examined the archaeology and social history of Homeric Greece did so from a Unitarian perspective, perhaps out of a wish to avoid the complexities of Analysis and Analysts' tendency to re-write each other's work indefinitely. Niese's 1873 Der homerische Schiffskatalog als historische Quelle betrachtet ("The Homeric catalogue of ships studied as a historical source") stands out. Schliemann, who began excavating Hisarlik in the 1870s, treated Homer as a historical source from an essentially Unitarian viewpoint.

=== Common ground between Analysts and Unitarians ===
Broadly speaking, Analysts tended to study the epics philologically, bringing to bear criteria, linguistic and otherwise, that were little different from those of the ancient Alexandrians. Unitarians tended to be literary critics who were more interested in appreciating the artistry of the poems than in analysing them.

But artistic merit was the unspoken motivation behind both schools of thought. Homer must at all costs be hallowed as the great, original, genius; everything good in the epics is to be attributed to him. So Analysts hunted for errors (as Zoilus had done), and blamed them on incompetent editors; Unitarians tried to explain errors away, sometimes even claiming they were really the best bits.

In both cases, therefore, there came to be a very strong tendency to equate good with authentic, and shoddy with interpolated. This, too, was a mindset inherited from the Alexandrians.

== 20th century ==
20th century Homeric scholarship had the shadow of Analysis and Unitarianism hanging over it, and much important work was done by old-style Analysts and Unitarians even up to the end of the century. Perhaps the most important Unitarian in the first half of the century was Samuel E. Bassett; and, as in the 19th century, some interpretive work argued for Unitarianism (e.g. George E. Dimock's 1989 The Unity of the Odyssey), while other literary criticism merely took a Unitarian perspective for granted. Some of the most important work on textual criticism and papyrology was done by Analyst scholars such as Reinhold Merkelbach and Denys L. Page (whose 1955 The Homeric Odyssey is a merciless but sometimes hilariously witty polemic against Unitarians). The biggest commentary on the Odyssey, published in the 1980s under the general editorship of Alfred Heubeck, is largely Analyst in tone, especially the commentary on books 21-22 by Manuel Fernández-Galiano. Some monographs from a strongly Analyst perspective continue to come out, primarily from the German-speaking world.

However, the most important new work on Homer done in the 20th century was dominated by two new schools of thought, most frequently referred to as "Oral Theory" (the term is resisted by some Oralists, especially Gregory Nagy); and "Neoanalysis". Unlike in the 19th century, however, these schools of thought are not opposed to one another; and in the last few decades they have been drawing on each other more and more in very constructive ways.

=== Oral Theory ===
Oral Theory, or Oralism, is a loosely used term for the study of the mechanisms of how the Homeric epics were orally transmitted, in terms of linguistics, cultural conditions, and literary genre. It therefore embraces philological analysis and literary criticism simultaneously. It has its origins in linguistics, but it was foreshadowed in some respects by Vico in the 18th century, and more immediately by Gilbert Murray. Murray was an Analyst, but his 1907 book The Rise of the Greek Epic contained some of the core ideas of Oralism: particularly the idea that the epics were the end result of a protracted process of evolution, and the idea that an individual poet named Homer had relatively little importance in their history.

The two figures at the head of Oralism are Milman Parry and his student Albert Lord, who continued his work after Parry's premature death. Parry was a structuralist linguist (he studied under Antoine Meillet, who in turn studied under Saussure) who set out to compare Homeric epic with a living oral tradition of epic poetry. In the 1930s and 1950s he and Lord recorded thousands of hours of oral performance of epic poetry (Bosniak, Croatian, Serbian, and Albanian) in the former Yugoslavia (primarily in Bosnia-Herzegovina) and northern Albania. Lord's later work (his 1960 book The Singer of Tales is the most pertinent to Homer) kick-started oral poetics as an entire new sub-discipline in anthropology. For Homeric scholarship the most important results of their work, and that of later Oralists, have been to demonstrate that:

1. Homeric epic shares many stylistic characteristics with known oral traditions;
2. thanks to the sophistication and mnemonic power of the formulaic system in Homeric poetry, it is entirely possible for epics as large as the Iliad and Odyssey to have been created in an oral tradition;
3. many curious features that offended the ancient Alexandrians and the Analysts are most probably symptomatic of the poems' evolution through oral transmission and, within limits, poets re-inventing them in performance (some have compared this to improvisation, rather as jazz musicians improvise upon a theme).

The biggest complete commentary on the Iliad, 1993's six volume The Iliad: A Commentary as edited by G.S. Kirk, is Oralist in its approach and emphasizes issues related to live performance such as rhythm; and the pedagogical commentaries by Peter Jones are heavily Oralist.

Some Oralists do not go so far as to claim that the Homeric epics actually are products of an oral epic tradition: many limit themselves to claiming that the Homeric epics merely draw on earlier oral epic. For much of the mid-20th century much of the resistance to Oral Theory came from scholars who could not see how to preserve Homer as the great original poet: they could not see how there was any room for artistry and creativity in a formulaic system where set-piece episodes (Walter Arend's "type scenes") were as formulaic as Parry's metrical epithet-noun combinations. Some scholars divided Oralists into "hard Parryists", who believed that all aspects of Homeric epic were predetermined by formulaic systems, and "soft Parryists", who believed that Homer had the system at his command rather than the other way round. More recently, books such as Nagy's influential 1979 book about epic heroes, The Best of the Achaeans, and Egbert Bakker's 1997 linguistic study Poetry as Speech, work on the principle that the radical cross-fertilisation and resonances between different traditions, genres, plot lines, episodes, and type scenes, are actually the driving force behind much of the artistic innovation in Homeric epic.

Where the joke about 19th century Analysts had it that the epics "were not composed by Homer but by someone else of the same name", now the joke is that Oral Theorists claim the epics are poems without an author. Many Oralists would happily agree with this.

=== Neoanalysis ===
Neoanalysis is quite separate from 19th century Analysis. It is the study of the relationship between the two Homeric epics and the Epic Cycle: the extent to which Homer made use of earlier poetic material about the Trojan War, and the extent to which other epic poets made use of Homer. The main obstacle to this line of research – and, simultaneously, the main impetus for it – is the fact that the Cyclic epics do not survive except in summaries and isolated fragments. Ioannis Kakridis is usually regarded as the founding figure of this school of thought, with his 1949 book Homeric Researches, but Wolfgang Kullmann's 1960 Die Quellen der Ilias ("The sources of the Iliad") is even more influential. Neoanalytic topics have become much more prominent in English-language scholarship since 1990, notably in a series of articles by M. L. West in Classical Quarterly and in Jonathan Burgess' 2001 book The Tradition of the Trojan War in Homer and the Epic Cycle. The recent upsurge is due in no small part to the publication of three new editions of the fragmentary Greek epics, including a translation by West for the Loeb Classical Library series.

Probably the most frequently cited and characteristic topic raised in Neoanalysis is the so-called "Memnon theory" outlined by Wolfgang Schadewaldt in a 1951 paper. This is the hypothesis that one major plot-line in the Iliad is based on a similar one in one of the Cyclic epics, the Aithiopis of Arctinus. The parallels run as follows:

Aithiopis	Iliad
Achilleus' comrade Antilochus excels in battle	Achilleus' comrade Patroclus excels in battle
Antilochus is killed by Memnon	Patroclus is killed by Hector
An enraged Achilleus pursues Memnon to the gates of Troy, where he kills him	An enraged Achilleus pursues Hector to the gates of Troy, chases Hector around the city walls, and kills him
Achilleus is in turn killed there by Paris	(It has previously been foretold to Achilleus that his own death will follow upon Hector's)

What is debated in the Memnon theory is the implications of these similarities. The most immediate implication is that the poet of the Iliad borrowed material from the Aethiopis. The debatable points are the poet's reasons for doing so; the status and condition of the Aethiopis story when this borrowing took place, that is to say whether it was Arctinus' epic that Homer borrowed from, or something less concrete, like a traditional legend; and the extent to which the Aethiopis and Iliad played off one another in their subsequent development.

A looser definition of Neoanalysis would include the reconstruction of earlier forms of the epics based exclusively on residue in the surviving versions of the Iliad and Odyssey, quite apart from any relationship to the material of the Epic Cycle. Steve Reece, for example, has proposed that anomalies of structure and detail in our surviving version of the Odyssey point to earlier versions of the tale in which Telemachus went in search of news of his father not to Menelaus in Sparta but to Idomeneus in Crete, in which Telemachus met up with his father in Crete and conspired with him to return to Ithaca disguised as the soothsayer Theoclymenus, and in which Penelope recognized Odysseus much earlier in the narrative and conspired with him in the destruction of the suitors. Similarly, Reece proposes, earlier versions of the Iliad can be detected in which Ajax played a more prominent role, in which the Achaean embassy to Achilles comprised different characters, and in which Patroclus was actually mistaken for Achilles by the Trojans. In this broader sense Neoanalysis can be defined as a form of Analysis informed by the principles of Oral Theory, recognizing as it does the existence and influence of previously existing tales and yet appreciating the technique of a single poet in adapting them to his Iliad and Odyssey.

== Recent developments ==
The dating of the Homeric epics continues to be a controversial topic. The most influential work in this area in the last few decades is that of Richard Janko, whose 1982 study Homer, Hesiod and the Hymns uses statistics based on a range of dialectal pointers to argue that the text of both epics became fixed in the latter half of the 8th century BCE, though he has since argued for an even earlier date. There is no shortage of alternative datings, however, based on other kinds of evidence (literary, philological, archaeological, and artistic), ranging from the 9th century to as late as 550 BCE (Nagy suggests in a 1992 paper that the text's "formative" period lasted until 550). At present most Homeric scholars opt for the late 8th or early 7th century, and a date of 730 BCE is often quoted for the Iliad.

Since the 1970s, Homeric interpretation has been increasingly influenced by literary theory, especially in literary readings of the Odyssey. Post-structuralist semiotic approaches have been represented in the work of Pietro Pucci (Odysseus Polytropos, 1987) and Marylin Katz (Penelope's Renown, 1991), for example.

Perhaps the most significant developments have been in narratology, the study of how storytelling works, since this combines empirical linguistic study with literary criticism. Irene de Jong's 1987 Narrators and Focalizers: The Presentation of the Story in the Iliad draws on the work of the theorist Mieke Bal, and de Jong followed this up in 2001 with her Narratological Commentary on the Odyssey; Bakker has published several linguistic-narratological studies, especially his 1997 Poetry as Speech; and Elizabeth Minchin's 2001 Homer and the Resources of Memory draws on several forms of narratology and cognitive science, such as the script theory developed in the 1970s by Roger Schank and Robert Abelson.

== See also ==
- Epic Cycle
- Homer
- Homeric Question
- Allegorical interpretations of Plato
- Jørgensen's law

== Bibliography ==
=== General ===
- Dickey, Eleanor (2007). Ancient Greek Scholarship: A Guide to Finding, Reading, and Understanding Scholia, Commentaries, Lexica, and Grammatical Treatises : From Their Beginnings to the Byzantine Period. Oxford: Oxford University Press.
- Jevons, Frank Byron (1886). "Rhapsodizing of the Iliad". The Journal of Hellenic Studies. VII: 291–308. doi:10.2307/623648. JSTOR 623648. S2CID 163742364.
- Nagy, Gregory (1997). "Homeric Scholia". In Morris, Ian; Powell, Barry B. (eds.). A New Companion to Homer. New York: E. J. Brill. pp. 101–122.
- Newhall, Samuel Hart (June 1908). "Peisistratus and his Edition of Homer". Proceedings of the American Academy of Arts and Sciences. XLIII (19).
- Pfeiffer, Rudolph (1968). History of Classical Scholarship from the Beginnings to the End of the Hellenistic Age. Oxford: Clarendon Press. ISBN 0-19-814342-7.
- Reynolds, L.D.; Wilson, N.G. (1991). Scribes and Scholars: A Guide to the Transmission of Greek & Latin Literature (3rd ed.). Oxford: Oxford University Press. ISBN 0-19-872146-3.
- Thompson, Edward Maunde (1911). "Palaeography". In Chisholm, Hugh (ed.). Encyclopædia Britannica. Vol. 20 (11th ed.). Cambridge University Press. pp. 556–579. This includes a discussion of the types of writing on papyrus Homeric documents.

=== Publications of scholia ===
- Bekker, Immanuel, ed. (1825). Scholia in Homeri Iliadem (in Ancient Greek and Latin). Berolini: Typis et Impensis G.E. Reimeri.
  - —— (1825). "Tomus Prior". Scholia in Homeri Iliadem.
  - —— (1825). "Tomus Alter". Scholia in Homeri Iliadem.
  - —— (1827). "Appendix". Scholiorm in Homeri Iliadem. Reimer.
- Maas, Ernestus, ed. (1887). Scholia Graeca in Homeri Iliadem Townleyana. Scholia Graeca in Homeri Iliadem Ex Codicibus Aucta et Emendata (in Ancient Greek and Latin) (A.G. Dinsdorfio Incohatae ed.). Oxonii: E Typographeo Clarendoniano.
  - —— (1875). "Tomus I". Scholia Graeca in Homeri Iliadem Townleyana.
  - —— (1875). "Tomus II". Scholia Graeca in Homeri Iliadem Townleyana. E typographeo Clarendoniano.
  - —— (1875). "Tomus III". Scholia Graeca in Homeri Iliadem Townleyana.
  - ——. "Tomus IV" (PDF). Scholia Graeca in Homeri Iliadem Townleyana.
  - —— (1888). "Tomus V". Scholia Graeca in Homeri Iliadem Townleyana. E typographeo Clarendoniano.
- Fontanella, Valeria (2023). Die Iliasglossare auf Papyrus: Untersuchungen zu einer Textkategorie (2023. Auflage ed.). Paderborn: Brill. ISBN 9783506791399.
- Thiel, Helmut Van (2014). Scholia D in Iliadem. Proecdosis aucta et correctior 2014. Secundum codices manu scriptos (in Ancient Greek, Latin, and German). Vol. 7. Universität zu Köln. ISBN 9783931596835.

=== "Classical" analysis ===
- Heubeck, Alfred (1974). Die Homerische Frage: ein Bericht über d. Forschung d. letzten Jahrzehnte Darmstadt. Erträge der Forschung, Bd. 27 (in German). Darmstadt: Wissenschaftliche Buchgesellschaft. ISBN 3-534-03864-9.
- Merkelbach, Reinhold (1969). Untersuchungen zur Odyssee... 2. durchgesehene und erweiterte Aufl. mit einem Anhang "Die pisistratische Redaktion der homerischen Gedichte". Zetemata. Monographien zur Klassischen Altertumswissenschaft, Heft 2 (in German) (2nd ed.). Munich: C.H. Beck'sche Verlagsbuchhandlung.
- Page, Denys Lionel (1955). The Homeric Odyssey: The Mary Flexner Lectures Delivered at Bryn Mawr College, Pennsylvania. Oxford: Clarendon Press.
- von Wilamowitz-Möllendorff, Ulrich (1916). Die Ilias und Homer (in German). Berlin: Weidmann.
- Wolf, Friedrich August; Grafton, Anthony (Tr.) (1988). Prolegomena to Homer, 1795. Princeton: Princeton University Press. ISBN 0-691-10247-3.

=== Neoanalysis ===
- Clark, Mark Edward (1986). "Neoanalysis: a bibliographical review". Classical World. 79 (6): 379–394. doi:10.2307/4349935. JSTOR 4349935.
- Griffin, Jasper (1977). "The epic cycle and the uniqueness of Homer". Journal of Hellenic Studies. 97: 39–53. doi:10.2307/631020. JSTOR 631020. S2CID 163041110.
- Kakridis, Johannes Theophanes (1987). Homeric Researches. Ancient Greek Literature (Subsequent ed.). New York: Garland Publishing. ISBN 0-8240-7757-1.
- Kullmann, Wolfgang (1960). Die Quellen der Ilias. Troischer Sagenkreis. Wiesbaden: Steiner. ISBN 3-515-00235-9.

=== Homer and oral tradition ===
- Bakker, Egbert J. (1997). Poetry in Speech: Orality and Homeric Discourse. Myth and Poetics. Ithaca NY: Cornell University Press. ISBN 0-8014-3295-2.
- Foley, John Miles (1999). Homer's Traditional Art. University Park PA.: Pennsylvania State University. ISBN 0-271-01870-4.
- Kirk, Geoffrey Stephen (1976). Homer and the Oral Tradition. Cambridge: Cambridge University Press. ISBN 0-521-21309-6.
- Lord, Albert B. (2000). Mitchell, Stephen (ed.). The Singer of Tales (2nd ed.). Cambridge MA.: Harvard University Press. ISBN 0-674-00283-0.
- Parry, Milman (1971). Parry, Adam (ed.). The Making of Homeric Verse: The Collected Papers of Milman Parry. Oxford: Oxford University Press. ISBN 0-19-520560-X.
- Powell, Barry B. (1991). Homer and the Origin of the Greek Alphabet. Cambridge: Cambridge University Press. ISBN 0-521-58907-X.
