= Aristide Colonna =

Italian classical scholar (1909–1999)

- Born: 20 March 1909; Fiumefreddo Bruzio, Cosenza, Calabria, Kingdom of Italy
- Died: October 31, 1999 (aged 90); Rome, Lazio, Italy
- Occupation: University professor
- Known for: Heliodorus • Himerius • Sophocles

Academic background
- Education: Sapienza University of Rome
- Thesis: Heliodori Aethiopica ad codices nunc primum excussos recognovit adnotatione critica instruxit A. C. (1930)
- Doctoral advisor: Nicola Festa

Academic work
- Discipline: Classical philology
- Sub-discipline: Ancient Greek literature
- Institutions: Accademia dei Lincei (1947–1951); University of Messina (1952–1954); University of Perugia (1954–1979)
- Notable works: Heliodorus 1938; Himerius 1951; Sophocles 1975, 1978, 1983

Aristide Colonna (20 March 1909 – 31 October 1999) was an Italian classical scholar and university professor.

== Biography ==
Colonna was born in contrada Torre del piccolo of Fiumefreddo Bruzio, a Calabrese comune in the province of Cosenza, from Enrico and Annamaria, who at the time of his birth were not yet married. After graduating from high school he moved to Rome and enrolled at the Sapienza University; here, Colonna studied Ancient Greek literature with Nicola Festa, Linguistics with Antonino Pagliaro, and Byzantine philology with Silvio Giuseppe Mercati, graduating on 26 June 1930, advised by Festa, with a thesis titled Heliodori Aethiopica ad codices nunc primum excussos recognovit adnotatione critica instruxit A. C. [The Aethiopica of Heliodorus, edited with critical apparatus by A. C., from manuscripts collated for the first time]. He was encouraged to pursue this research by Mercati, who pointed him at MS. Vat. gr. 1390.

From 1947 to 1951 worked as adjunct librarian at the Accademia dei Lincei. In 1952 he became Professor in Greek literature at the University of Messina, and delivered the opening speech for the 1952–1953 academic year (La fondazione di Messina nella poesia di Callimaco [The Foundation of Messina in the poetry of Callimachus]). In 1954 he moved to the University of Perugia where he taught until 1979. In that year he became "professore fuori ruolo", and retired in 1984. From 1957 to 1961 he was the first chair of the newly founded Faculty of Humanities.

He was a member of the Società Tiburtina di Storia e d'Arte from 1968.

He died in 1999, aged 90. He was married and had two children, Annamaria and Enrico.

== Research activity ==
Colonna studied Greek literature from the beginnings to the Byzantine era, working on Phrynichus, Himerius, Hesiod, Themistius, Libanius and Sophocles, and also on Tzetzes, Psellus and Eustathius. Related to Heliodorus, he studied Philagathus of Cerami and his commentary on the Aethiopica. Occasionally he worked on textual transmission of Greek texts through papyri and published two papyri of the University of Milan collection.

Colonna published critical editions of Hesiod's Works and Days, of the plays by Sophocles, of two critical essays by Psellus and of the Etymologicum Genuinum (letter lambda). He also studied the Byzantine reception of said writers, and published the Introduction to Hesiod and the Life of Hesiod written by John Tzetzes (12th century) as well as studying his Commentary on Oppian's "Halieutica"; a Life of Oppian written by Constantine Manasses; and both the ancient Life of Sophocles and the Byzantine rewriting by Manuel Moschopoulos. For a learned audience, he edited and/or translated the poems by Catullus, the speech Against the Corn-Dealers by Lysias, Book I and an anthology of Livy, the Georgics by Virgil, two books of the Odyssey, the treatise Contra Celsum by Origen, Hesiod's works, and the Histories by Herodotus. He published an anthology of Latin literature and a history of Greek literature.

His greatest claim to fame is the critical edition of the Aethiopica by Heliodorus (an ancient Greek novel), which expanded his dissertation and was published by the Accademia dei Lincei in 1938. It came with almost all the testimonia pertaining to Heliodorus and his novel, including the commentary by Philagathus and verses which Colonna attributed to Theodore Prodromos, but for which Niketas Eugenianos has also been proposed. Colonna published his edition in parallel with the Budé edition by R. M. Rattenbury and T. W. Lumb, whose first volume he had reviewed; his edition was reviewed (and criticised) by Rattenbury in return. Colonna's work was considered the most advanced stage of research on the novel although it was open to some criticism, e.g. by Michael Reeve. Twelve years after his edition, Colonna gave other significant contributions to the chronology of Heliodorus, showing that it was Heliodorus who took inspiration from the descriptions of the siege of Nisibis (350 d.C.) given by Julian and Ephraem the Syrian for his own description of the siege of Seine (9.1–9), and not the other way round, supporting a thesis already proposed by Marchinus van der Valk in 1940. Decades later, he revised the text and newly published it, with facing Italian translation and commentary, including an assessment of Heliodorus' life and possible influences.

After publishing his edition of Heliodorus, Colonna began working on the late antique rhetor and sophist Himerius. Originally encouraged by Festa, his work was delayed by World War II:

Latin: Himerianae parandae editioni ... operam dedi, ad hoc me hortante magistro meo dilectissimo, Nicolao Festa, quam ... per tot immanis belli pacisque discrimina semper ea persecutus sum diligentia.

[I ..., encouraged to this task by my excellent Master, Nicola Festa, dedicated myself to prepare an edition of Himerius, that ... I pursued with diligence through different times of immane war and peace.]

— Himerius 1951, p. ix

He eventually published the critical edition of Himerius' orations and declamations, which became the reference text. He had planned a second edition in order to include an Oslo papyrus published in 1956, which was never completed.

His third and last large-scale critical edition were the plays by Sophocles, which started the Greek series of the corpus Paravianum (Turin). With the help of his students, he investigated the textual transmission and the Byzantine reception of Sophocles, publishing his whole seven plays in three volumes. Hugh Lloyd-Jones, then-Regius Professor of Greek at Oxford (Corpus Christi College) and future editor himself of Sophocles for the OCT, reviewed both the second and the third volume, highlighting its strong points.

Those of his scripta minora written in Latin were collected after his retirement and published in 1981.

== Works ==
Colonna's full bibliography up to 1979 was published in his scripta minora of 1981 and again, following his death, in 2000. An updated account was compiled in 2000 by his student Fiorenza Bevilacqua. Abbreviations are in accordance with the standards set by L'Année Philologique, with the addition of:

- ALF(Pg) = Annali della Facoltà di Lettere e Filosofia dell'Università degli Studi di Perugia (Perugia: Università degli Studi).
- AMST = Atti e Memorie della Società Tiburtina di Storia e d'Arte (Tivoli: Società Tiburtina di Storia e d'Arte, Villa d'Este).
- BPEC = Bollettino del comitato per la Preparazione dell'Edizione nazionale dei Classici greci e latini (Rome: Royal Academy of Italy; 1940–1942) + N(ew) S(eries) (Rome: Accademia dei Lincei; 1945–1979).
- SFI = Studi di Filologia Italiana. Bollettino annuale dell'Accademia della Crusca (Florence: Le Lettere).

=== Books ===
- Catullo (1945). Colonna, A. (ed.). I carmi. Rome: Italgraf.
- Colonna, A. (1955). L'antica lirica greca. Turin: Lattes.
- Colonna, A. (1962). La letteratura greca: storia della letteratura greca antica dalle origini al quinto secolo d. Cr. Turin: Lattes.
- Colonna, A. (1981). Scripta minora. Brescia: Paideia. ISBN 9788839400789. LCCN 81177582 (Kleine Schriften).
- Colonna, A., ed. (1967). Etymologicum genuinum: littera Λ. Quaderni «Athena», 4. Rome: Edizioni dell'Ateneo. LCCN 74312631.
- Colonna, A.; Reggio, G. (1948). Antologia latina ad uso delle scuole medie inferiori. Turin: Chiantore.
- Eliodoro (1987). Colonna, A. (ed.). Le Etiopiche. Classici greci. Translated by Bevilacqua, F. Turin: UTET. OCLC 917461325.
- Erodoto (1996). Colonna, A. (ed.). Storie. Classici greci. Translated by Bevilacqua, F. Turin: UTET. OCLC 469293605.
- Eschilo (1948). Colonna, A. (ed.). I Persiani. Commented by V. Inama. Turin: Lattes.
- Esiodo (1977). Colonna, A. (ed.). Opere. Classici greci. Turin: UTET. OCLC 469301656.
- Heliodorus (1938). Colonna, A. (ed.). Aethiopica. Scriptores Graeci et Latini. Romae: Typis Regiae officinae Polygraphicae. LCCN 41005404. OCLC 3348190.
- Hesiodus (1959). Colonna, A. (ed.). Opera et dies. Testi e documenti per lo studio dell'antichità, 1. Milan: Istituto Editoriale Cisalpino.
- Hesiodus (1968). Colonna, A. (ed.). Le opere e i giorni. Classici greci e latini, 4 (2nd ed.). Milan: Istituto Editoriale Italiano. LCCN 70406963. OCLC 978136553 — augmented ed. of the previous.
- Himerius (1951). Colonna, A. (ed.). Declamationes et orationes cum deperditarum fragmentis. Scriptores Graeci et Latini. Romae: Typis officinae Polygraphicae. OCLC 316937323.
- Lisia (1932). Colonna, A. (ed.). Orazione contro i rivenditori di grano. Naples: Perrella.
- Livio, T. (1942). Colonna, A. (ed.). Libro I. Firenze: Sansoni.
- Livius, T. (1939). Colonna, A. (ed.). Narrationes selectae. Florence: Vallecchi.
- Lucrezio (1946). Colonna, A. (ed.). Antologia. Rome.
- Omero (1944). Colonna, A. (ed.). Odissea, Libro IX. Florence: Sansoni.
- Omero (1959). Colonna, A. (ed.). Odissea, Libro XI. Milan: Società Editrice Dante Alighieri.
- Origene (1971). Colonna, A. (ed.). Contro Celso. Classici delle religioni, 19 (Sezione 4: La religione cattolica). Turin: UTET. LCCN 72351419. OCLC 2914772.
- Sofocle (1940). Colonna, A. (ed.). Antigone. Turin: Lattes.
- Sophocles (1975). Colonna, A. (ed.). Fabulae. Vol. I. Turin: Paravia. LCCN 77478916.
- Sophocles (1978). Colonna, A. (ed.). Fabulae. Vol. II. Turin: Paravia. LCCN 77478916.
- Sophocles (1983). Colonna, A. (ed.). Fabulae. Vol. III. Turin: Paravia. LCCN 77478916.
- Vergilius (1946). Colonna, A. (ed.). Georgica, cum Servii aliorumque adnotationibus selectis. Olympia, 2. Augustae Taurinorum: Chiantore.

=== Articles ===
- Colonna, A. (1931). "Per una edizione critica delle Etiopiche di Eliodoro". RAL. 6th S. 7: 285–301.
- Colonna, A. (1936a). "Note alla storia del testo eliodoreo". RAL. 6th S. 12: 352–362.
- Colonna, A. (1936b). "Review of Héliodore 1935". Il Mondo Classico. 6 (6): 349–351.
- Colonna, A. (1940a). "Ad papyrum mag. Paris. (IV, 3043 sqq. Preisend.)". Aegyptus. 20 (1–2): 48–50. JSTOR 41214758 = Scripta minora 1981, pp. 135–138.
- Colonna, A. (1940b). "Bibliografia epicarmea". Dioniso. 8: 33–36.
- Colonna, A. (1940c). "De codice quodam Sophoclis antiquissimo". Athenaeum. N. S. 18 (1–2): 270–280 = Scripta minora 1981, pp. 63–69.
- Colonna, A. (1940d). "Due papiri di Achille Tazio". BPEC. 1: 61–83.
- Colonna, A. (1940e). "Heliodorea". BPEC. 1: 41–60.
- Colonna, A. (1940f). "Tradizione manoscritta e critica congetturale in Erodoto". Athenaeum. N. S. 18 (1–2): 1–15.
- Colonna, A. (1940g). "Traduzioni ottocentesche di Erodoto in Italia e la questione del dialetto erodoteo". Atti della XXVIII Riunione della Società italiana per il progresso delle scienze. Vol. V. Rome: Società italiana per il progresso delle scienze. pp. 223–230.
- Colonna, A. (1940h). "Un nuovo frammento dei Persiani di Ferecrate". Dioniso. 8: 147–169.
- Colonna, A. (1941a). "Disputationes Himerianae". BPEC. 2: 147–169.
- Colonna, A. (1941b). "Sul frammento di Aristofane 142 K.". Dioniso. 8: 249–253.
- Colonna, A. (1942). "De scholiis quibusdam in Nicandrum vetustioribus". BPEC. 3: 196–217 = Scripta minora 1981, pp. 95–116.
- Colonna, A. (1945). "De Herodoti memoria". BPEC. N. S. 1: 41–83 = Scripta minora 1981, pp. 21–62.
- Colonna, A. (1946a). "Erodoto". Paideia. 1: 341–353.
- Colonna, A. (1946b). "Su alcuni frammenti di lirici greci". SIFC. N. S. 21: 23–40.
- Colonna, A. (1947a). "Per una edizione di Teocrito". Paideia. 2: 224–228.
- Colonna, A. (1947b). "Sulla cronologia della Elettra di Sofocle". Dioniso. 10: 204–209.
- Colonna, A. (1947c). "Un antico epillio di Ero e Leandro". SIFC. N. S. 22: 231–239.
- Colonna, A. (1948). "Varianti d'autore negli scrittori antichi". Paideia. 3: 277–278.
- Colonna, A. (1950a). "Il testo di Imerio nella Biblioteca di Fozio". Miscellanea G. Galbiati. Fontes Ambrosiani, 36. Vol. II. Milan: Hoepli. pp. 95–106.
- Colonna, A. (1950b). "L'assedio di Nisibis del 350 d. Cr. e la cronologia di Eliodoro Emiseno". Athenaeum. N. S. 28: 79–87.
- Colonna, A. (1951a). "De Theoxeno Cynico scriptore". Aegyptus. 31 (2): 212–213. JSTOR 41215375 = Scripta minora 1981, pp. 127–129.
- Colonna, A. (1951b). "Disputationes Himerianae". BPEC. N. S. 2: 147–170.
- Colonna, A. (1951c). "La cronologia dei romanzi greci. Le Etiopiche di Eliodoro". Il Mondo Classico. 38: 143–159.
- Colonna, A. (1952a). "Aristofane ed Eupoli nella seconda parabasi dei Cavalieri". Dioniso. N. S. 15: 32–37.
- Colonna, A. (1952). "Frammento di un antico codice di Nicandro". PP. 24: 212–221.
- Colonna, A. (1952–1953). "La fondazione di Messina nella poesia di Callimaco". Annuario dell'Università di Messina. Messina: Università. pp. 19–30.
- Colonna, A. (1953a). "I Prolegomeni ad Esiodo e la Vita esiodea di Giovanni Tzetzes". BPEC. N. S. 2: 27–39.
- Colonna, A. (1953b). "Michaelis Pselli de Euripide et Georgio Pisida iudicium". Atti dello VIII Congresso Internazionale di Studi Bizantini. Studi Bizantini e Neoellenici, 7. Vol. I. Rome: Associazione Nazionale per gli Studi Bizantini. pp. 16–21.
- Colonna, A. (1953c). "Note alla tradizione manoscritta di Erodoto". BPEC. N. S. 2: 14–26.
- Colonna, A. (1954a). "De Hesiodi operum recensione quae Messania vulgo appellatur". BPEC. N. S. 3: 49–55 = Scripta minora 1981, pp. 1–8.
- Colonna, A. (1954b). "Un antico commento ai Theriaca di Nicandro". Aegyptus. 34 (1): 3–26. JSTOR 41215476.
- Colonna, A. (1955). "Homerica et Hesiodea". BPEC. N. S. 3: 45–55.
- Colonna, A. (1956a). "Glosse volgari meridionali in un codice omerico". RIL. 89: 195–212.
- Colonna, A. (1956b). "Su un nuovo epigramma al romanzo di Eliodoro". BPEC. N. S. 4: 25–27.
- Colonna, A. (1956c). "Tradizione ed esegesi della cosiddetta Carta di Rossano" (PDF). RIL. 89: 9–26.
- Colonna, A. (1957). "Euripide e il dramma di Medea". RFIC. N. S. 4 (4): 371–381.
- Colonna, A. (1958). "L'esemplare Φ degli Erga esiodei". BPEC. N. S. 6: 19–27.
- Colonna, A. (1959). "Adnotationes ad papyrum Oxy. 2310,1". BPEC. N. S. 7: 51–53 = Scripta minora 1981, pp. 131–134.
- Colonna, A. (1960a). "Note esiodee". Studi in onore di Luigi Castiglioni. Florence: Sansoni. pp. 237–244.
- Colonna, A. (1960b). "Teofane Cerameo e Filippo Filosofo". BPEC. N. S. 8: 25–28.
- Colonna, A. (1961a). "Esiodo, Teogonia 271-299". In Castiglioni, L. (ed.). Papiri della Università di Milano. P.Mil.Vogl. Vol. II. Milan: A. Giuffré. pp. 14–15. LCCN 38014817. OCLC 8910016.
- Colonna, A. (1961b). "Himeriana". BPEC. N. S. 9: 33–39.
- Colonna, A. (1962–1963). "Erodoto nella critica recente". Cultura e Scuola. 6: 57–62.
- Colonna, A. (1963). "Il commento di Giovanni Tzetzes agli Halieutica di Oppiano". Lanx satura Nicolao Terzaghi oblata. Genoa: Istituto di Filologia Classica e Medievale. pp. 101–104.
- Colonna, A. (1963–1964). "Elegie inedite di Angelo Decembrio". ALF(Pg). 1: 51–59.
- Colonna, A. (1964). "De Oppiani vita antiquissima". BPEC. N. S. 12: 33–40 = Scripta minora 1981, pp. 117–126.
- Colonna, A. (1965a). "Achille Tazio, Leucippe e Clitofonte, VI 14-15; 16-17". In Cazzaniga, I. (ed.). Papiri della Università di Milano. P.Mil.Vogl. Vol. III. Milan – Varese: Istituto Editoriale Cisalpino. pp. 50–54. LCCN 38014817. OCLC 8910016.
- Colonna, A. (1965b). "La carta rossanese del codice Barberino lat. 3205". SFI. 23: 5–17.
- Colonna, A. (1967). "Nota all'edizione nazionale degli Inni di Sinesio". BPEC. N. S. 15: 149–150.
- Colonna, A. (1969). "La tradizione del testo omerico in Origene". BPEC. N. S. 17: 61–66.
- Colonna, A. (1970a). "Tibur e Tiburnus". AMST. 43: 3–8.
- Colonna, A. (1970b). "Review of Erbse 1969". BZ. 63: 319–321 = Scripta minora 1981, pp. 1–8.
- Colonna, A. (1971). "De Lexico Vindobonensi et Etymologico Genuino quaestiones". BPEC. N. S. 19: 13–19 = Scripta minora 1981, pp. 139–148.
- Colonna, A. (1972a). "De Sophocleo exemplari ab Eustathio adhibito". BPEC. N. S. 20: 27–32 = Scripta minora 1981, pp. 79–87.
- Colonna, A. (1972b). "De Sophoclis codicum familia Parisina". Studi classici in onore di Q. Cataudella. Vol. I. Catania: Facoltà di Lettere e Filosofia. pp. 205–212 = Scripta minora 1981, pp. 71–78.
- Colonna, A. (1973). "Ad Sophoclis recensionem Triclinianam". BPEC. N. S. 21: 79–80 = Scripta minora 1981, pp. 89–90.
- Colonna, A. (1975). "De Hesiodi fragmento 251a M.-W." Prometheus. 1 (1): 88.
- Colonna, A. (1976). "De novo Sophoclis fragmento". Sileno. 2: 75–76 = Scripta minora 1981, pp. 91–92.
- Colonna, A. (1978). "De peculiari Demosthenis lectione in Sophocle laudando adhibita". In Livrea, E.; Privitera, G. A. (eds.). Studi in onore di Anthos Ardizzoni. Vol. I. Rome: Edizioni dell'Ateneo & Bizzarri. pp. 219–220 = Scripta minora 1981, pp. 93–94.
- Colonna, A. (1981). "La incarnazione dell'anima nel romanzo di Eliodoro". Sileno. 7: 203–204.
- Colonna, A. (1982a). "Note critiche al testo di Eliodoro". AAT. 116: 37–43.
- Colonna, A. (1982b). "Note linguistiche alla Commentatio in Charicleam di Filagato monaco di Rossano". Rivista Storica Calabrese. 3 (1–2): 75–76.
- Colonna, A. (1982c). "Un epigramma di Filagato da Cerami sul romanzo di Eliodoro". Lirica greca da Archiloco a Elitis. Studi in onore di F. M. Pontani. Studi bizantini e neogreci, 14. Padua: Liviana. pp. 247–248.
- Colonna, A. (1982d). "Volgarismi in Eliodoro". Paideia. 37: 86.
- Colonna, A. (1988a). "La recensione moscopulea della Vita Sophoclis". Koinonia. 12: 171–180.
- Colonna, A. (1988b). "La vita eterna di Edipo". In Amata, B. (ed.). Cultura e lingue classiche. Rome: LAS. pp. 129–130.
- Colonna, A. (1988c). "Una profezia del Cristo attribuita a Sofocle". In Calderone, S.; De Salvo, L. (eds.). Polyanthema. Studi di letteratura cristiana antica offerti a Salvatore Costanza. Studi Tardoantichi, 7. Vol. I. Messina: Sicania. pp. 113–118.
- Colonna, A. (1991). "Un frammento pseudo-eschileo in Clemente Alessandrino". Sileno. 17: 239–241.
- Colonna, A. (1992). "Un epigramma di Teodoro Prodromo sulla «Cariclea» di Eliodoro". In Felici, S. (ed.). "Humanitas" classica e "sapientia" cristiana. Studi in onore di R. Iacoangeli. Rome: LAS. pp. 61–63.
- Colonna, A. (1993a). "Atetesi in Erodoto". Sileno. 19: 417–418.
- Colonna, A. (1993b). "Una testimonianza eschilea in Imerio (T 150 Radt)". Paideia. 48: 104.
- Colonna, A. (1994a). "De Erodoti exemplari a Eustathio adhibito". Sileno. 20: 357–358.
- Colonna, A. (1994b). "Nota su un codice antico di Achille Tazio (Marciano gr. 409)". In Crimi, C.; Curto, C. (eds.). Studi classici e cristiani offerti a F. Corsaro. Università. pp. 179–181.
- Colonna, A. (1994c). "Note a una nuova edizione di Eschilo". Paideia. 49: 203–204.
- Colonna, A. (1995). "Vigiliae Herodoteae". Paideia. 50: 95–102.
- Colonna, A. (1997a). "De Aeschyli locis ab Eustathio laudatis". In Criscuolo, U. M.; Maisano, R. (eds.). Synodia: studia humanitatis Antonio Garzya septuagenario ab amicis atque discipulis dicata. Naples: D'Auria. pp. 163–164.
- Colonna, A. (1997b). "De corruptis nonnullis Senacae locis". Paideia. 52: 93–95.
- Colonna, A. (1998). "Ad fabulam de Achillis et Patrocli amoribus". Latinitas. 46: 92.
- Colonna, A. (2001). "Sulla profezia di Tisameno in Erodoto". Paideia. 56: 121–122.

== Festschriften ==
- Valgiglio, E., ed. (1982). Studi in onore di Aristide Colonna. Perugia: Istituto di Filologia Classica.
- Benedetti, F.; Grandolini, S., eds. (2003). Studi di filologia e tradizione greca in memoria di Aristide Colonna. Naples: Edizioni Scientifiche Italiane.

== Bibliography ==
- Amundsen, L.; Eitrem, S. (1956). "Fragments from the Speeches of Himerios". Classica & Mediaevalia. 17: 23–30.
- Bevilacqua, F. (1972). "Note alla recensione Veneta di Sofocle". BPEC. 20: 21–25.
- Bevilacqua, F. (1973). "Questioni sofoclee". BPEC. 21: 61–78.
- Bevilacqua, F. (1973–1974). "Il commento di Giovanni Tzetzes a Sofocle". ALF(Pg). 11: 557–570.
- Bevilacqua, F. (1974). "Nota al Pap. Oxy. 1369 di Sofocle". BPEC. N. S. 22: 49–52.
- Bevilacqua, F. (2000a). "Aristide Colonna: bibliografia completa". Paideia. 55: 363–381.
- Bevilacqua, F. (2000b). "Ricordo di Aristide Colonna". Paideia. 55: 357–362.
- Bianchi, N. (2010). "Lettori di Eliodoro a Bisanzio: il carme per Cariclea". Graeco-Latina Brunensia. 15 (2): 13–24. hdl:11222.digilib/115015.
- Brillante, S. (2024). "Nicola Festa, lictor philologus". In Bianchi, N. (ed.). Nicola Festa (1866-1940): Documenti, lettere, libri. Bari: Università degli Studi di Bari «Aldo Moro». pp. 79–94. ISBN 978-88-6629085-8.
- Cagiano de Azevedo, P. (2013). Accademia nazionale dei Lincei. Inventario dell'archivio (1944–1965). Pubblicazioni degli Archivi di Stato • Strumenti, 145. Rome: Istituto Poligrafico e Zecca dello Stato. ISBN 978-887125-318-3.
- Celotto, A. (2009-08-10). "Fuori ruolo dei professori universitari: quando il legislatore cambia idea". Rivista di Diritto e Giustizia Costituzionale. 236.
- Einaudi, L.; De Gasperi, A.; Gonella, G. (1950-07-25). "Legge 4 luglio 1950, n. 168". GU(sg). 91 (168): 2138 – via normattiva.it.
- Erbse, H., ed. (1969). Scholia Graeca in Homeri Iliadem (Scholia vetera). Vol. I. Berlin: W. De Gruyter. doi:10.1515/9783110844788. ISBN 978-31-10-02558-3.
- Follieri, E. (1997). "La filologia bizantina in Italia nel secolo XX". In Acconcia Longo, A.; Perria, L.; Luzzi, A. (eds.). Byzantina et Italograeca. Studi di filologia e di paleografia. Raccolta di Studi e Testi, 195. Rome: Edizioni di Storia e Letteratura. ISBN 9788890013843.
- Gallavotti, C., ed. (1946). Theocritus quique feruntur Bucolici Graeci. Romae: Typis Officinae Polygraphicae.
- Gärtner, H. (1971). "Johannes Eugenikos, Protheoria zu Heliodors Aithiopika". BZ. 64 (2): 322–325. doi:10.1515/bz-1971-0203.
- Gronchi, G.; Moro, A.; Medici, G. (October 23, 1957). "Decreto del Presidente della Repubblica 23 ottobre 1957, n. 1200". GU(sg). 98 (317): 4557 – via gazzettaufficiale.it.
- Héliodore (1935). Rattenbury, R. M.; Lumb, T. W. (eds.). Les Éthiopiques. Vol. I. Translated by Maillon, J. Paris: Les Belles Lettres.
- Lloyd-Jones, H. (1978). "Review of Sophocles 1975". CR. New Series. 28 (2): 214–221. JSTOR 3062230.
- Lloyd-Jones, H. (1981). "Review of Sophocles 1978". CR. New Series. 31 (2): 167–173. JSTOR 3063812.
- Maltese, E. V. (1988). "Review of Eliodoro 1987". Maia. 40: 192–196.
- Mazza, P. F. (2024). "Colonna, Aristide". In Sergi, P. (ed.). Dizionario Biografico della Calabria Contemporanea (in Italian). Arcavacata di Rende (CS): Istituto Calabrese per la Storia dell'Antifascismo e dell'Italia Contemporanea. ISBN 978-88-941045-8-5 – via icsaicstoria.it.
- Medda, E. (2020). "Le edizioni dei classici greci". BollClass. 41: 53–81.
- Penella, R. J., ed. (2007). Man and the Word: The Orations of Himerius. The Transformation of the Classical Heritage, 43. Berkeley • Los Angeles • London: University of California Press. ISBN 978-0-520-25093-2. LCCN 2007020213. OCLC 41404537.
- Radt, S., ed. (1977). Tragicorum Graecorum Fragmenta. Vol. IV. Göttingen: Vandenhoeck & Ruprecht. ISBN 3-525-25753-8.
- Rattenbury, R. M. (1925). "The Manuscripts and Editions of Heliodorus". The Classical Quarterly. 19 (3–4): 177–181. doi:10.1017/S0009838800015810. JSTOR 636278.
- Rattenbury, R. M. (1926). "Two Manuscripts of Heliodorus". The Classical Quarterly. 20 (1): 36–40. doi:10.1017/S0009838800007497. JSTOR 636241.
- Rattenbury, R. M. (1929). "Codex Laurentianus Graecus LXX. 36". The Classical Quarterly. 23 (2): 100–104. doi:10.1017/S0009838800003232. JSTOR 637175.
- Rattenbury, R. M. (1939). "An Italian Edition of the Aethiopica". The Classical Review. 53 (4): 126–127. doi:10.1017/S0009840X00083694. JSTOR 704694.
- Reeve, M. D. (1968). "Notes on Heliodorus' Aethiopica". The Classical Quarterly. 18 (2): 282–287. doi:10.1017/S0009838800022114. JSTOR 638071.
- Robinson, D. N. (1939). "Review of Heliodorus 1938". The Classical Weekly. 33 (4): 40–41. JSTOR 4340682.
- Redazione (1968). "Elenco dei soci". AMST. 41: 279.
- Sophocles (1990). Lloyd-Jones, H.; Wilson, N. G. (eds.). Fabulae. Scriptorum Classicorum Bibliotheca Oxoniensis. Oxford: Clarendon Press. ISBN 0-19-814577-2.
- Valk, M. H. A. L. H. (van der) (1940). "Remarques sur la date des Éthiopiques d'Héliodore". Mnemosyne³. 9 (2): 97–100. JSTOR 4426956.
- Vogliano, A. (1938). "Un papiro di Achille Tazio". SIFC. N. S. 15: 121–130.
- West, M. L. (1969). "Review of Hesiodus 1968". Gnomon. 41 (2): 118–121. JSTOR 27684659.
