= Erbse =

Erbse is a surname. Notable people with the surname include:

- Hartmut Erbse (1915–2004), German classical philologist
- Heimo Erbse (1924–2005), German composer
