= Nicanor Stigmatias =

Ancient Greek grammarian

Nicanor Stigmatias (/naɪˈkeɪnər ˌstɪɡməˈtaɪəs/; Greek: Nικάνωρ Στιγματίας Nīkā́nōr Stigmatíās) was a celebrated grammarian, who lived during the reign of the Roman emperor Hadrian in the early 2nd century AD.

According to the Suda he came from Alexandria; according to Stephanus of Byzantium he came from Hierapolis.

According to the Suda, he acquired the joking nickname Stigmatias (στιγματίας, "punctuated" but also "tattooed") because his labours were principally directed to punctuation. From his having devoted much of his attention to the elucidation of Homer's epics through punctuation, Stephanus also calls him "the new Homer", ὁ νέος Ὅμηρος.

He wrote also on the punctuation of Callimachus; and a work On punctuation in general (περὶ καθόλου στιγμῆς).

He is copiously quoted in the Venetus A scholia on Homer's Iliad.

(Fabricius Bibl. Graec. i.368, 517, iii.823, vi.345.)

== Editions ==
- Scholia on the Iliad:
  Erbse, H. 1969–88, Scholia Graeca in Homeri Iliadem, 7 vols. (Berlin)
- Nicanor's work reconstructed from the Iliad scholia:
  Friedländer, L. 1967 [1850], Nicanoris περὶ Ἰλιακῆς στιγμῆς: reliquiae emendatiores, 2nd ed. (Amsterdam)

== See also ==
- Homeric scholarship
