= Venetus B =

- Biblioteca Nazionale Marciana
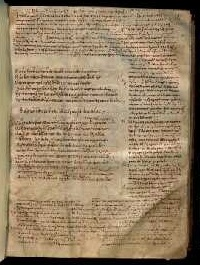
- Page from the Venetus B
- Also known as: Marcianus Graecus Z. 453 (= 821)
- Type: Codex
- Date: 11th century AD
- Place of origin: Byzantine Empire (probably Constantinople)
- Language: Ancient Greek
- Scribe(s): Two contemporary 11th-century hands; further layers by a 13th-century hand and a still later scribe
- Material: Parchment
- Size: 40.5 cm × 31.5 cm, 338 leaves
- Format: 12–24 lines of Homeric text per folio, surrounded on three sides by scholia
- Script: Greek minuscule
- Contents: Full text of the Iliad; extensive marginal and interlinear scholia of the bT family
- Accession: Gr. Z. 453 (=821)

Venetus B is the common name for the 11th-century AD manuscript codex of Homer's Iliad catalogued in the Biblioteca Marciana in Venice as Codex Marcianus Graecus Z. 453, now 821. Its name is Latin for "Venetian B," the designation being introduced by Villoison in his 1788 editio princeps of the Venice Homer scholia as a space-saving sigil alongside Venetus A.

Venetus B is one of the oldest surviving manuscripts of the Iliad and, together with the slightly earlier Venetus A and the 11th-century Townleyanus (London, British Library, Burney 86).

== Contents ==
Venetus B contains, in one volume:

- a full text of the Iliad in Ancient Greek, copied in minuscule script;
- a substantial corpus of marginal and interlinear scholia, written by a scribe contemporary with the copyist of the poem;
- several later strata of annotation (primarily 13th-century, with further additions in a still later hand) occupying the spaces left by the original scribes.

A typical folio carries between twelve and twenty-four lines of the Homeric text, surrounded on three sides by a dense body of scholia. Where the original scribes left space around or beyond the main scholia, later hands added further layers of annotation.

=== The scholia ===
The scholia of Venetus B belong overwhelmingly to the family designated "b" by modern editors. Together with the closely related Townley manuscript (T) they form the bT family, which is conventionally assumed to descend from a lost common ancestor, designated "c" by some scholars. Two 11th-century manuscripts in the library of the Escorial, Escorialensis Υ.1.1 and Ω.1.12 (Allen's E3 and E4), also belong to the b family; Venetus B and Escorial Υ.1.1 in particular share so much material that they are often treated as "twins" descended mechanically from a single archetype.

The later, 13th-century layer of annotation in Venetus B, according to the classicist Hartmut Erbse, consists largely of mythological scholia and glosses drawn from lexica or from the Epimerismi Homerici. The outermost margins contain material from Porphyry's Homeric Questions and from the Pseudo-Heraclitean Allegoriae Homericae. Where space remained, a scribe of a still later period added excerpts from the Etymologicum Magnum, the Suda, and the Epimerismi Homerici.

Whereas Venetus A coordinates most of its main scholia with the Iliad through lemmata (short quotations of the relevant Homeric text), Venetus B uses a system of numerals, comparable to modern footnote references, to link each scholion to the line on which it comments.

== History ==
Nothing is known for certain about the place or circumstances of the manuscript's production. On palaeographical grounds it is assigned to the 11th century AD, and its text and primary scholia were written by two contemporary scribes. Like Venetus A, it is presumed to have been produced in the Byzantine Empire, most probably in Constantinople.

At some point Venetus B was brought to Italy, though the circumstances are uncertain. It was once thought that the humanist Giovanni Aurispa, who in a letter of 1424 to Ambrogio Traversari mentioned bringing two volumes "of Aristarchus on the Iliad" back from Greece, had imported Venetus A and Venetus B together. This identification has since been questioned, since the scholia of both manuscripts name several authorities besides Aristarchus, which Aurispa would have been unlikely to pass over in silence; Aubrey Diller argued that Aurispa's two volumes were in fact a two-volume copy of Eustathius' Iliad commentary (Laurentianus LIX 2 and 3).

Venetus B, like Venetus A, eventually entered the collection of the Byzantine-born cardinal Bessarion, the most important patron of Greek learning in 15th-century Italy. In 1468 Bessarion donated his library—over a thousand Greek and Latin books—to the Republic of Venice, and continued to add to it until his death in 1473. This collection formed the core of the Biblioteca Marciana; both Venetus A and B are currently housed there.

The manuscript was largely neglected by Western scholars until the late 18th century. In 1788 the French Hellenist Jean-Baptiste-Gaspard d'Ansse de Villoison published his Homeri Ilias ad veteris codicis Veneti fidem recensita, which printed the text and scholia of Venetus A together with a selection of scholia from Venetus B.

In 2007, Venetus B was photographed at high resolution by the Homer Multitext project, in a campaign that also digitised Venetus A and other important Marciana manuscripts. The resulting images were published under a Creative Commons licence and made freely available for scholarly use through the Center for Hellenic Studies of Harvard University.

== Editions ==
- Villoison, J. B. G. d'Ansse de (1788), Homeri Ilias ad veteris codicis Veneti fidem recensita; scholia in eam antiquissima ex eodem codice aliisque nunc primum edidit (Venice) — first publication of the A and B scholia.
- Bekker, I. (1825–1827), Scholia in Homeri Iliadem (Berlin) — A and B scholia.
- Dindorf, W., and E. Maass (1875–1888), Scholia Graeca in Homeri Iliadem, 6 vols. (Oxford) — includes the B and T scholia.
- Erbse, H. (1969–1988), Scholia Graeca in Homeri Iliadem (scholia vetera), 7 vols. (Berlin) — the standard modern edition of the A and bT scholia, though excluding the D scholia and the mythographical / allegorical scholia derived from Porphyry. ISBN 3-11-002558-2
- Homer Multitext project (2007), high-resolution digital facsimile.
