= Aristonicus of Alexandria =

Ancient Greek writer of the Roman era

Aristonicus of Alexandria (Ancient Greek: Ἀριστόνικος ὁ Ἀλεξανδρεύς, Aristonikos ho Alexandreus) was a distinguished Greek grammarian who lived during the reigns of Augustus and Tiberius, contemporary with Strabo. He taught at Rome, and wrote commentaries and grammatical treatises.

== Works ==
Aristonicus is mentioned as the author of several works, most of which were related to the Homeric poems.

- On the wanderings of Menelaus (περὶ τῆς Μενελάου πλάνης)
- On the critical signs of the Iliad and Odyssey (περὶ τῶν σημείων τῆς Ἰλιάδος καὶ Ὀδυσσείας), on the marginal signs by which the Alexandrian critics used to mark suspected or interpolated verses in the Homeric poems and in Hesiod's Theogony
- On ungrammatical words (ἀσυντάκτων ὀνομάτων βιβλία), a work of six books on irregular grammatical constructions in Homer

These and some other works are all now lost, with the exception of fragments preserved in the passages above referred to. By far the most important fragments of Aristonicus' work are preserved in the scholia of the Venetus A manuscript of the Iliad.

=== Editions ===
- Scholia on the Iliad:
  Erbse, H. 1969–88, Scholia Graeca in Homeri Iliadem, 7 vols. (Berlin)
- Aristonicus' work reconstructed from the Iliad scholia:
  Friedländer, L. 1965 [1853], Aristonici Alexandrini περὶ σημείων Ιλιάδος reliquiae emendatiores, reprint (Amsterdam)

== See also ==
- Homeric scholarship – Study of any Homeric topic, especially the Iliad and Odyssey
