= Apion =

1st century CE Egyptian grammarian and sophist

Apion (Greek: Ἀπίων; fl. 1st century CE), also called Apion Pleistoneices (Greek: Ἀπίων Πλειστονίκου, Apíōn Pleistoníkēs) and Apion Mochthos (μόχθος) was an Egyptian grammarian and sophist in first century Egypt. Apion wrote several works, none of which have survived.

== Biography ==
Apion was an Egyptian or Graeco-Egyptian scholar of Ptolemaic Egypt, born in the El Kargeh oasis. He studied under Didymus Chalcenterus and later succeeded Theon as head of the Alexandrian school. Apion gained recognition as a lecturer, speaking in Rome and elsewhere.

In 40 CE, he was part of a delegation sent by the Greek community of Alexandria to the Roman Emperor Gaius (Caligula) following anti-Jewish riots. The delegation intended to prevent the Emperor from granting again the rights the Jews of Alexandria had held previously and Apion argued that the Jews were unpatriotic as they did not rightly honoured the Emperor. According to Josephus, Apion further implied that the Jews took an oath to show no goodwill to gentiles and perpetrated the blood libel that Jews secretly sacrificed humans in the Temple in Jerusalem. The Jewish historian Josephus criticized Apion extensively in Book 2 of his polemic Against Apion (Lat: Contra Apionem).

Apion wrote extensively about his native Egypt. Details of his life come almost exclusively from other ancient sources, most prominently Pliny the Elder, Aulus Gellius, as well as the 10th century Byzantine encyclopedia the Suda. According to Aulus Gellius, he wrote a version of the folk tale "Androcles and the Lion" (Noctes Atticae 5.14). Pliny related that Apion claimed to have summoned the spirit of Homer to determine the poet’s origins (Natural History 30.6.18). He wrote an alphabetic glossary of Homeric themes—a work, like others of its kind, based on the scholarship of Aristarchus of Samothrace (c. 220 – c. 143 BCE); it survives only in fragments and through the writings of Apollonius the Sophist.

According to the Suda, he was dubbed "Mochthos" (μόχθος), a word meaning "toil, labor, hardship, or trouble" in reference to his tireless work habits.

== Works ==
Apion is known to have written several texts, all of which are lost literary works, surviving only as fragments, allusions, or epitomes in works by later authors. The well-known story "Androcles and the Lion", which is preserved in Aulus Gellius, is from his work: Aegyptiaca/Αἰγυπτιακά ("Wonders of Egypt"). The surviving fragments of his work are printed in the Etymologicum Gudianum, ed. Sturz, 1818.

- Upon Homer, whose poems seem to have formed the principal part of his studies, for he is said not only to have made the best recension of the text of the poems, but to have written explanations of phrases and words in the form of a dictionary (Λέξεις Ὁμηρικαί), and investigations concerning the life and native country of the poet. The best part of his Λέξεις Ὁμηρικαί are supposed to be incorporated in the Homeric Lexicon of Apollonius. Apion's labors upon Homer are often referred to by Eustathius and other grammarians.
- A work on Egypt (Αἰγυπτιακά) consisting of five books, which was highly valued in antiquity, for it contained descriptions of nearly all the remarkable objects in Egypt. According to Josephus in Against Apion, it also contained numerous attacks upon the Jews.
- A work in praise of Alexander the Great.
- Histories of separate countries. (Ἱστορία κατὰ ἔθνος, Suda s. v. Ἀπίων.)
- On the celebrated glutton Apicius.
- On the language of the Romans (Περὶ τῆς ‛Ρωμαίων διαλέκτου).
- De metallica disciplina.
- Androclus and the Lion and The Dolphin near Dicaearchia. The greatest fragments of the works of Apion are the story about Androclus and his lion, and about the dolphin near Dicaearchia.

== Epigrams ==
In the Suda we find references to an Apion as a writer of epigrams (s. vv. Ἀγύρτης, σπιλάδες, σφάραγον, and τρίγληνα), but whether he is the same as the grammarian is uncertain.

== See also ==
- Against Apion
