= Bruno Snell =

German classical scholar (1896–1986)

- Snell in 1968
- Born: 18 June 1896; Hildesheim, German Empire
- Died: 31 October 1986 (aged 90); Hamburg, West Germany
- Education: University of Edinburgh; University of Oxford; University of Göttingen
- Scientific career
- Fields: Classical philology
- Workplaces: University of Hamburg
- Academic advisors: Hermann Fränkel
- Notable students: Joachim Latacz

Bruno Snell (18 June 1896 – 31 October 1986) was a German classical philologist. From 1931 to 1959, he held a chair for classical philology at the University of Hamburg, where he established the Thesaurus Linguae Graecae research centre in 1944.

== Biography ==
After studying law and economics at University of Edinburgh and University of Oxford, Snell gained interest in classical studies and finally changed his major to classical philology. He earned his Ph.D. from the University of Göttingen in 1922.

Snell served as the inaugural president of the Mommsen Society from 1950 to 1954. In 1953, the Europa-Kolleg Hamburg, an institution promoting research and postgraduate education in the field of European integration, was founded on Snell's initiative. Since 1989, the Mommsen Society has awarded the Bruno Snell Prize to young classical scholars.

His book, The Discovery of the Mind: The Greek Origins of European Thought (Die Entdeckung des Geistes, Hamburg, 1946, trans. T.G. Rosenmeyer, 1953) argues that the development of Greek literature from Homer to Aristophanes and Plato shows a gradual self-discovery of an inner mental life. It argues that the Greek culture developed a unique and individual inner world of thought for humans, which did not exist before. This is similar to later psychological theories of the development and evolution of human consciousness.

== Decorations and awards ==
Snell was a member of the Academies of Sciences of Göttingen, Munich, Vienna, Copenhagen, the German Academy for Language and Literature as well as of PEN International.

- 1970 Hegel Prize
- 1976 Austrian Medal for Science and Art
- 1977 Pour le Mérite for Arts and Sciences
