= Heraclitus (commentator) =

1st-century AD Greek grammarian and rhetorician

Heraclitus (Greek: Ἡράκλειτος; fl. 1st century AD) was a grammarian and rhetorician, who wrote a Greek commentary on Homer which is still extant.

Little is known about Heraclitus. It is generally accepted that he lived sometime around the 1st century AD. His one surviving work has variously been called Homeric Problems, Homeric Questions, or Homeric Allegories.

In his work, Heraclitus defended Homer against those who denounced him for his immoral portrayals of the gods. Heraclitus based his defense of Homer on allegorical interpretation. He gives interpretations of major episodes from the Iliad and the Odyssey, particularly those that received the greatest criticism, such as the battles between the gods and the love affair between Aphrodite and Ares.

Many of his allegories are physical, claiming that the poems represent elemental forces; or ethical, that they contain edifying concealed messages. An important example of physical allegory is Heraclitus' interpretation of the love affair between Aphrodite and Ares. He argues that Aphrodite and Ares represent Love and Strife, the forces responsible for the mixture and separation of the elements in Empedocles' philosophy, which were "united together after their ancient rivalry (philoneikia) in one accord". Because "everything was joined together (harmosthenai) tranquilly and harmoniously", Heraclitus argues, "[it] was reasonable for all the gods to laugh and rejoice together at this because their individual inclinations were not at variance over immoral acts, but were enjoying peaceful accord". He also interprets the affair as an allegory for the art of metalworking. His work contains a good deal of philosophical knowledge, especially Stoicism.
