= Joachim Latacz =

German classical philologist

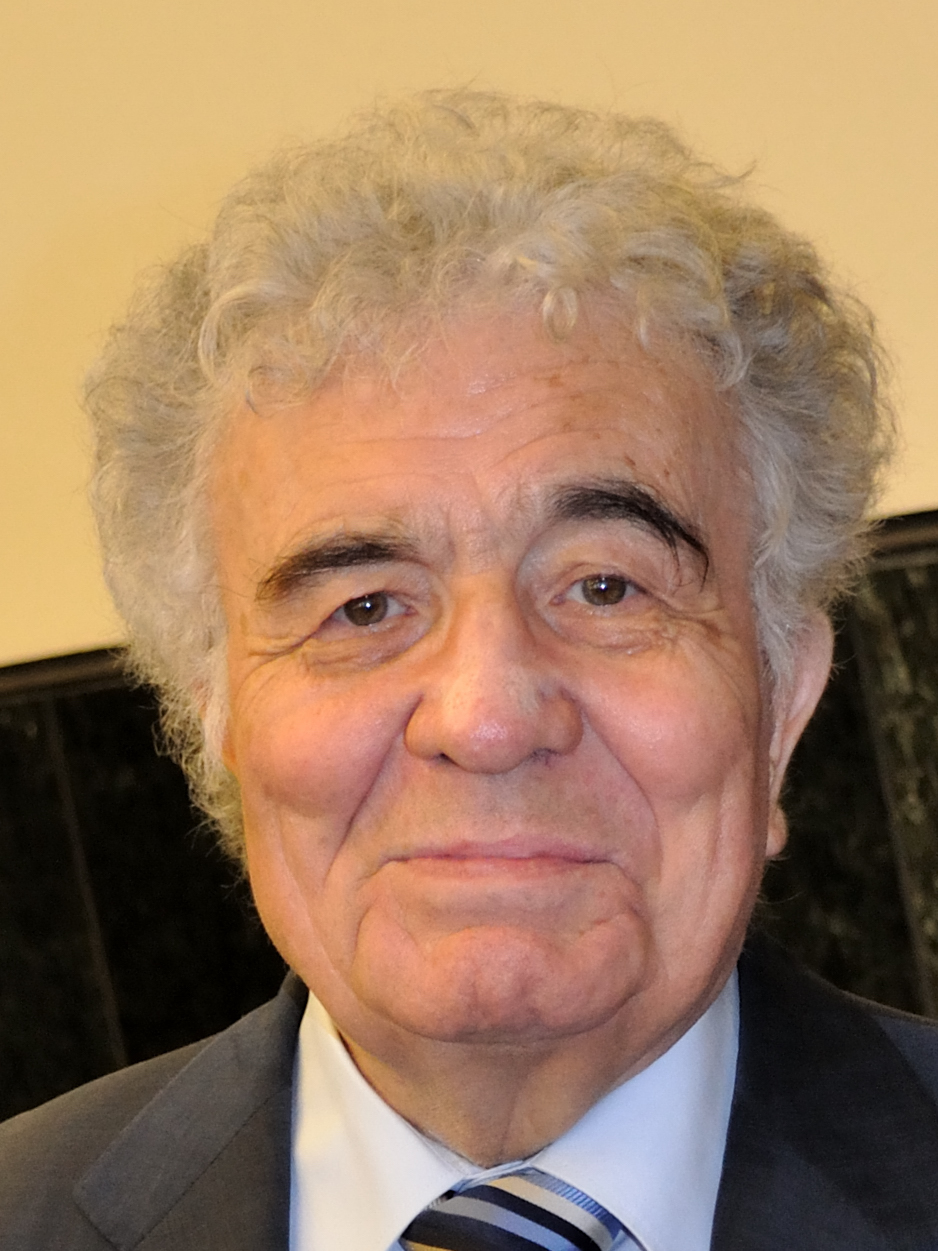
- Born: April 4, 1934 (age 92); Katowice (in the Autonomous District of Upper Silesia), Polish Republic
- Education: Martin Luther University of Halle-Wittenberg
- Scientific career
- Fields: Classical philology
- Workplaces: University of Basel
- Academic advisors: Bruno Snell, Hartmut Erbse, Uvo Hölscher

Joachim Latacz (born 4 April 1934) is a German classical philologist.

Latacz studied Classical Philology, Indo-Germanic languages, Ancient History and Archaeology from 1954-1956 at the Martin Luther University of Halle-Wittenberg. He then studied Classical Philology, Ancient History and Philosophy at the Free University of Berlin, completing his first degree in 1960. From 1960–1966 was a research associate at the Thesaurus Linguae Graecae under Bruno Snell and Hartmut Erbse at the University of Hamburg. He earned his Ph.D. at the Free University of Berlin under Uvo Hölscher in 1963.

Latacz is a specialist in ancient Greek literature and culture, and is widely considered one of the most distinguished experts in the German-speaking world on Homer and epic.

== Life and research ==
For over twenty years he was one of the most important supporters of Manfred Korfmann, the archaeologist and Troy specialist. Latacz repeatedly defended the hypothesis that the Homeric account of the Trojan War essentially goes back to genuine historical events in the late Bronze Age.

In 1972 he submitted his habilitation in Classical Philology at the University of Würzburg, and was appointed associate professor thereat in 1978. Shortly afterwards he accepted a call to the Chair of Classical Philology (Greek) at the University of Mainz.

From 1981 until his retirement Latacz was Ordinarius (Full Professor) of Greek Philology and Head of Department at the University of Basel (Switzerland). In addition to his teaching activity, he occupied himself with early Greek literature and published numerous works on Homer and the performance of Greek tragedy and lyrics.

At present, he is working on a complete commentary on the Iliad, with two volumes (text plus commentary) for each book of the epic (this will make it the largest commentary since that of Eustathius). A volume of prolegomena and six volumes of the commentary itself have been published so far.

== Bibliography ==
Monographs

- (1966) Zum Wortfeld ‚Freude‘ in der Sprache Homers, Heidelberg (PhD thesis at Freie Universität Berlin 1963) ISBN 978-3-533-00456-1
- (1977) Kampfparänese, Kampfdarstellung und Kampfwirklichkeit in der Ilias, bei Kallinos und Tyrtaios, München(Zetemata 66, Habilitation thesis, Würzburg 1972) ISBN 978-3-406-05156-2
- (1985) Homer. Der erste Dichter des Abendlands, München/Zürich, 2nd ed. 1989, 3rd ed. Düsseldorf/Zürich 1997; 4th continuously revised ed. 2003. (Also translated into Italian 1990, nd ed. 1998, Dutch 1991, English 1996, 1998 (paperback), Greek 2000 and Turkish 2001.) ISBN 978-3-538-07157-5
- (1992, with Bernhard Kytzler and Klaus Sallmann) Klassische Autoren der Antike: Literarische Porträts von Homer bis zu Boethius, Frankfurt/Main 1992. ISBN 978-3-458-16209-4
- (1993) Einführung in die griechische Tragödie, 2nd continuously updated ed. 2003. (Also in Turkish in 2006.) ISBN 978-3-8252-1745-7
- (1994) Erschließung der Antike: Kleine Schriften zur Literatur der Griechen und Römer. Edited by Fritz Graf, Jürgen von Ungern-Sternberg, Arbogast Schmitt and Rainer Thiel, Stuttgart/Leipzig. ISBN 978-3-598-77425-6
- (1995) Achilleus. Wandlungen eines europäischen Heldenbildes, Stuttgart/Leipzig, 2nd ed. 1997. ISBN 978-3-519-07552-3
- (1996, with Bernhard Kytzler and Klaus Sallmann) Kleine Enzyklopädie der antiken Autoren. Literarische Porträts von Homer bis Boethius, Frankfurt/Main. ISBN 978-3-458-33556-6
- (1998) Fruchtbares Ärgernis. Nietzsches ‚Geburt der Tragödie‘ und die gräzistische Tragödienforschung, Basel. ISBN 978-3-7965-1131-8
- (2001) Troia und Homer. Der Weg zur Lösung eines alten Rätsels. München/Berlin, 2nd ed. 2001, 3rd ed. 2001, 4th entirely updated ed. 2003, 5th continuously reupdated and extended ed. Leipzig 2005, 6th updated and extended ed. 2010. ISBN 978-3-7338-0332-2 (With translations into Spanish 2003, English 2004 and Greek 2005; Turkish in progress).
- (2001) Troia – Wilios – Wilusa. Drei Namen für ein Territorium. Basel, 2nd ed. 2002. (Special print for the exhibition „Troia – Traum und Wirklichkeit“ in the Kunst- und Ausstellungshalle der Bundesrepublik Deutschland, Bonn (16 November 2001 — 17 February 2002); obtainable from the author)

Edition (books)

- (1979) Homer. Tradition und Neuerung, Darmstadt (Wege der Forschung 436). ISBN 978-3-534-06833-3
- (1991) Griechische Literatur in Text und Darstellung. I: Archaische Periode (von Homer bis Pindar). Herausgegeben, eingeleitet, übersetzt und kommentiert von Joachim Latacz, Stuttgart, 2nd revised ed. 1998. ISBN 978-3-15-008061-0
- (1991) Homer. Die Dichtung und ihre Deutung (Wege der Forschung 634), Darmstadt. ISBN 978-3-534-09217-8
- (1991) Zweihundert Jahre Homer-Forschung. Rückblick und Ausblick, Stuttgart/Leipzig. ISBN 978-3-598-77412-6
- (2008) Homer. Der Mythos von Troia in Dichtung und Kunst, München 2008 (= academic companion volume for the exhibition of Homer in Basel-Mannheim 2008–09). ISBN 978-3-7774-3965-5

Edition (journals, book series)

- (1975–1998) Würzburger Jahrbücher für die Altertumswissenschaft.
- (1991–) Studia Troica.
- (2000–) Homers Ilias. Gesamtkommentar.
