= Didymus Chalcenterus =

Greek scholar and grammarian (c.63 BC–c.AD 10)

Didymus Chalcenterus (Latin; Greek: Δίδυμος Χαλκέντερος, Dídymos Chalkénteros, "Didymus Bronze-Guts"; c. 63 BC – c. AD 10) was an Ancient Greek scholar and grammarian who flourished in the time of Cicero and Augustus.

== Life ==
The epithet "Bronze-Guts" came from his indefatigable industry: he was said to have written so many books that he was unable to recollect what he had written in earlier ones, and so often contradicted himself. (Note: 'It is known to have happened to Didymus, than whom no one wrote more books, that when he objected to someone's account as being false, a book of his that contained the same account was produced.' ('Nam Didymus, quo nemo plura scripsit, accidisse compertum est ut, cum historiae cuidam tamquam vanae repugnaret, ipsius proferretur liber qui eam continebat.') Quintilian 1.9.19.) Athenaeus (4.139c) records that he wrote 3,500 treatises, while Seneca gives the figure of 4,000. (Note: 'quattuor milia librorum Didymus grammaticus scripsit'.Letters 88:37.) As a result, he acquired the additional nickname (βιβλιολάθας, biblioláthas), meaning "Book-Forgetting" or "Book-forgetter", a term coined by Demetrius of Troezen.

He lived and taught in Alexandria and Rome, where he became the friend of Varro. He is chiefly important as having introduced Alexandrian learning to the Romans.

== Works ==
He was a follower of the school of Aristarchus, and wrote a treatise on Aristarchus' edition of Homer entitled On Aristarchus' recension (περὶ τῆς Ἀριστάρχου διορθώσεως perí tís Aristárchou diorthoséos), fragments of which are preserved in the Venetus A manuscript of the Iliad.

He also wrote monographs on many other Greek poets and prose authors. He is known to have written on Hesiod, the Greek lyric poets, notably Bacchylides and Pindar, and on drama; the better part of the Pindar and Sophocles scholia originated with Didymus. The Aristophanes scholia also cite him often, and he is known to have written treatises on Euripides, Ion, Phrynichus's Kronos, Cratinus, Menander, and many of the Greek orators including Demosthenes, Aeschines, Isaeus, Hypereides and Deinarchus.

Besides these commentaries there are mentions of the following works, none of which survives:

- On phraseology in tragedy (περὶ τραγῳδουμένης λέξεως perí tragodouménis léxeos), which comprised at least 28 books
- Comic phraseology (λέξις κωμική léxis komike), of which Hesychius made much use
- a third linguistic work on words of ambiguous or uncertain meaning, comprising at least seven books
- a fourth linguistic work on false or corrupt expressions
- a collection of Greek proverbs (περὶ παροιμιῶν perí paroemión) in 13 books, from which most of the proverbs in Zenobius' collection are taken.
- On the law-tablets of Solon (περὶ τῶν ἀξόνων Σόλωνος perí tón axónon Sólonos), a work mentioned by Plutarch.
- He is attributed with writing a critique of Cicero's De re publica, comprising six books, referred to by Ammianus Marcellinus (22.16), which provoked Suetonius to counter with a defense of that Roman writer. The authenticity of the attribution has been questioned on the grounds there is no evidence Didymus knew Latin, and the suggestion the source may have confused Didymus Chalcenterus with Claudius Didymus, who wrote a critique of Thucydides' style, and a work comparing Latin and Greek.

In addition, there survive extracts on agriculture and botany, mention of a commentary on Hippocrates, and a completely surviving treatise On all types of marble and wood (περὶ μαρμάρων καὶ παντοίων ξύλων perí marmáron kai pantoíon xýlon). In view of the drastic difference in subject matter, it is possible that these represent the work of a different Didymos.

The Stoic philosopher Seneca, in his Epistulae Morales ad Lucilium, claims that Didymus wrote 4,000 books, while making a commentary on the acquisition of useless knowledge.

Further insight into Didymus' methods of writing was provided by the discovery of a papyrus fragment of his commentary on the Philippics of Demosthenes. This confirms that he was not an original researcher, but a scrupulous compiler who made many quotations from earlier writers, and who was prepared to comment about chronology and history, as well as rhetoric and style.

== In fiction ==
- Didymus is a lead character in Michael Livingston's 2015 historical fantasy novel The Shards of Heaven.

== Sources ==
=== Editions ===
- Scholia on the Iliad:
  Erbse, H. 1969-88, Scholia Graeca in Homeri Iliadem, 7 vols. (Berlin)
- Didymus' work reconstructed from the Iliad scholia:
  Schmidt, M. 1964 [1854], Didymi Chalcenteri grammatici Alexandrini fragmenta quae supersunt omnia, reprint (Amsterdam)
- The commentary on Demosthenes:,
  Didymos: On Demosthenes, edited with a translation by Philip Harding, 2006 (OUP)

== See also ==
- Homeric scholarship
- Venetus A

== Sources ==
- Athenaeus (1928). Gulick, Charles Burton [in German] (ed.). Deipnosophistae. Vol. 2. Harvard University Press.
- Athenaeus (1940). Gulick, Charles Burton [in German] (ed.). Deipnosophistae. Vol. 4. Harvard University Press.
- Braswell, Bruce Karl (2017). Didymos of Alexandria: Commentary on Pindar. Schwabe AG. ISBN 978-3-796-53493-5.
- Gibson, Craig A. (2002). Interpreting a Classic: Demosthenes and his Ancient Commentators. University of California Press.
- Pfeiffer, Rudolf (1968). History of classical scholarship from the beginnings to the end of the Hellenistic age. Vol. 1. Clarendon Press. ISBN 9780198143420.
- Schironi, Francesca (2018). The Best of the Grammarians: Aristarchus of Samothrace on the Iliad. University of Michigan Press. ISBN 978-0-472-13076-4.
