= Archibius of Alexandria =

Ancient Greek writer

Archibius (Ancient Greek: Ἀρχίβιος) of Alexandria was a grammarian of ancient Egypt. He was the son (or possibly father) of the renowned grammarian Apollonius the Sophist, and wrote an interpretation of the epigrams of Callimachus.
