= Europa-Kolleg Hamburg =

German foundation

The Europa-Kolleg Hamburg is a foundation under private law. Its objective lies in the promotion of research and postgraduate education in the field of European integration and international cooperation. The foundation provides financial and administrative support for these purposes.

In 1978, the Europa-Kolleg Hamburg established, with the consent of the University of Hamburg, the Institute for Integration Research (now: Institute for European Integration) in order to create an organisational framework for research and postgraduate education. The Institute was granted the status of an academic institution at the University. The Institute’s activities which are supported in particular by the European Union and the Deutscher Akademischer Austauschdienst (DAAD, German Academic Exchange Service), include various research projects, academic conferences and public lectures most of which are published at Nomos, Baden-Baden, in the “Schriftenreihe des Europa-Kollegs Hamburg zur Integrationsforschung” (Publication series of the Europa-Kolleg Hamburg on integration research).

Currently, one of the Institute’s principal fields of activity is the Master Programme “European and European Legal Studies”. This master programme is offered in cooperation with the University of Hamburg at the Europa-Kolleg. The Europa-Kolleg owns an apartment house which accommodates students as well as academic researchers from all over Europe and the world.

== History ==
In 1953, the Europa-Kolleg Hamburg was established as a foundation under private law on the initiative of the Prof. Dr. Bruno Snell, then Vice Chancellor of the University of Hamburg. The Europa-Kolleg Hamburg has always supported the process of European integration by postgraduate academic education, interdisciplinary research, public conferences and publications. In the beginning, the Europa-Kolleg offered particularly qualified German and foreign students from various academic backgrounds the chance to live and study under one roof. In the 1960s, educational and doctoral programmes for postgraduate students were further expanded. The graduate school “Integrationsforschung” (integration studies) funded by the Deutsche Foschungsgemeinschaft (DFG, German Research Foundation) became the centre of the activities in the 1990s. Approx. 45 doctoral students graduated from the school. Since 1998, the Europa-Kolleg offers the postgraduate programme “Master of European Studies” to students from all over the world. The programme has recently been restructured. The new postgraduate programme “Master of European and European Legal Studies” is offered since the academic year 2008/09.

== Institute for European Integration ==
The Institute for European Integration provides the organisational framework for the academic activities of the Europa-Kolleg Hamburg. It is recognised as an academic institution at the University of Hamburg and enjoys the fundamental right of freedom of research and academic education granted by German constitution. The Institute’s objective is the promotion and implementation of interdisciplinary research relating to European integration as well as to other regional or global integration processes. These activities are pursued either at the Institute’s own initiative or in cooperation with other academic institutions. Furthermore, the Institute is, in cooperation with the University of Hamburg, responsible for the implementation of academic education, in particular for the postgraduate programme “Master of European and European Legal Studies”.

== Master "European and European Legal Studies" ==
The postgraduate programme “Master of European Studies” which was offered since 1998 until the academic year 2007/2008 was restructured according to the requirements of the Bologna Process and was replaced by the Master programme “European and European Legal Studies”. Since the academic year 2008/09, students may earn either of two academic degrees, i.e. “Master of Arts (M.A.)” or “Master of Laws (LL.M.)". The interdisciplinary study programme covers the legal, economic and political aspects of European Integration. The Master Programme is offered primarily in English, in parts also in German as a secondary course language. It is however possible to study the entire programme in English. A large number of German and foreign students from all over the world have successfully graduated from the master programme. Among them were 32 students from Kosovo, who were awarded scholarships by the European Union in 2008.
