= Apollonius the Sophist =

1st century AD Greek grammarian

Apollonius the Sophist (Greek: Ἀπολλώνιος ὁ Σοφιστής) was a famous grammarian, who probably lived towards the end of the 1st century AD and taught in Rome in the time of Tiberius. He was born in Alexandria, the son of another grammarian, Archibius of Alexandria (or was possibly Archibius's father).

He was the author of a Homeric dictionary (Λέξεις Ὁμηρικαί), the only work of this kind existent today. His chief authorities were Aristarchus of Samothrace and Apion's Homeric glossary (although some sources cite Apion as a disciple of Apollonius). The surviving text of this dictionary is an epitome, that is, it is a shortened summary of the original. In the original version, Apollonius apparently supplied at least one quotation in each entry.

It was edited for the first time by Villoison (1773, 2 vol. in quarto) from a manuscript of Saint Germain, and also by I. Bekker (1833).
