= Marchinus van der Valk =

Dutch pastor and classicist (1910–1992)

- Born: Marchinus Hyminus Arnoldus Leonardus Hendrikus van der Valk; 31 July 1910; Rotterdam, Netherlands
- Died: 5 January 1992 (aged 81); Capelle aan den IJssel, Netherlands
- Occupations: Pastor, classical scholar

Academic background
- Education: Leiden University
- Thesis: Beiträge zur Nekyia (1935)

Academic work
- Notable works: Researches on the Text and Scholia of the Iliad (1963–1964); Eustathii Commentarii ad Homeri Iliadem pertinentes (1971–1987)

Marchinus Hyminus Arnoldus Leonardus Hendrikus van der Valk (31 July 1910 – 5 January 1992) was a Dutch Protestant pastor and classical scholar.

Van der Valk studied classics at the Leiden University, obtaining his Ph.D. with a dissertation on the nekyia in the Odyssey. He also held a degree in Theology. He became pastor of Wijngaarden in 1938, of Weert in 1945, and of Rumpt in 1951. He retired in 1976 and moved to a retirement structure in 1987. He died in 1992, aged 81.

Despite never holding any academic positions, van der Valk frequently published academic essays dealing with Ancient Greek literature, including four monographs dealing with Homeric matters — the nekyia of Odysseus, the text of the Odyssey and two volumes on the text and scholia of the Iliad — and one volume of studies on Euripides. He became well known for his critical edition of the Commentaries on the Iliad by Eustathius of Thessalonica, sponsored by the Dutch Research Council and published by Brill, in four volumes.

== Works ==
=== Eustathius ===
- Eustathius (1971). Valk, M. H. A. L. H. (van der) (ed.). Commentarii ad Homeri Iliadem pertinentes ad fidem codicis Laurentiani. Vol. I. Leiden: E. J. Brill.
- Eustathius (1976). Valk, M. H. A. L. H. (van der) (ed.). Commentarii ad Homeri Iliadem pertinentes ad fidem codicis Laurentiani. Vol. II. Leiden: E. J. Brill.
- Eustathius (1979). Valk, M. H. A. L. H. (van der) (ed.). Commentarii ad Homeri Iliadem pertinentes ad fidem codicis Laurentiani. Vol. III. Leiden: E. J. Brill.
- Eustathius (1987). Valk, M. H. A. L. H. (van der) (ed.). Commentarii ad Homeri Iliadem pertinentes ad fidem codicis Laurentiani. Vol. IV. Leiden: E. J. Brill.

=== Monographs ===
- Valk, M. H. A. L. H. (van der) (1935). Beiträge zur Nekyia. Proefschrift Rijksuniversiteit te Leiden. Kampen: J. H. Kok.
- Valk, M. H. A. L. H. (van der) (1949). Textual Criticism of the Odyssey. Leiden: A. W. Sijthoff.
- Valk, M. H. A. L. H. (van der) (1963). Researches on the Text and Scholia of the Iliad. Vol. I. Leiden: E. J. Brill.
- Valk (van der), M. H. A. L. H. (1964). Researches on the Text and Scholia of the Iliad. Vol. II. Leiden: E. J. Brill.
- Valk, M. H. A. L. H. (van der) (1985). Studies in Euripides. Amsterdam: A. M. Hakkert.

== Bibliography ==
- Bremer, J.-M. (1995). "In memoriam M. van der Valk". In Keizer, H. M. (ed.). Indices in Eustathii commentarios ad Iliadem pertinentes. Leiden: E. J. Brill. pp. vii–viii.
- Erbse, H. (1993). "Marchandus van der Valk†". Gnomon (in German). 65 (5): 474–475. JSTOR 27691410.
