= Egbert Bakker =

Dutch classical scholar (born 1958)

Egbert Jan Bakker (born 12 November 1958) is a Dutch classical scholar specializing in Greek language, literature and linguistics. He currently is a professor of Classics at Yale University.

== Career ==
Bakker was born in 1958 in Amsterdam. He obtained his PhD from Leiden University in 1988. Bakker was a Fellow at the Netherlands Institute for Advanced Study in the Humanities and Social Sciences for several months in 1992. He lectured at Leiden University, University of Virginia, University of Texas at Austin, and the Université de Montréal before starting at Yale University in 2004.

Bakker became a corresponding member of the Royal Netherlands Academy of Arts and Sciences in 1999.

Bakker is cited in the acknowledgments of the first two novels of Rick Riordan’s Percy Jackson and the Olympians series.
