= Ioannis Kakridis =

Greek classical scholar (1901–1992)

- Ιωάννης Κακριδής
- Born: 17 November 1901
- Died: 20 March 1992 (aged 90)
- Burial place: First Cemetery of Athens

Academic background
- Education: University of Athens

Ioannis Kakridis (Greek: Ιωάννης Κακριδής; 17 November 1901 – 20 March 1992) was a Greek classical scholar and was one of the leading scholars of Homeric Poetry in the twentieth century.

He was born in Athens in 1901 and received his PhD at the University of Athens. He went on to become a professor at the universities of Athens, Thessaloniki, Tübingen, Stockholm, Lund and Uppsala. Kakridis was a Homer scholar and one of the most important classicists of twentieth-century Greece. He was also an early and staunch advocate of the adoption of the monotonic system in the Greek language. In 1941, he was denounced by the faculty of the University of Athens for republishing a lecture in the monotonic system, which led to the so-called "Trial of Accents" and his suspension and later dismissal from the university.

The list of his written work is quite extensive. The most important works are a translation into the modern Greek language of the works of Homer, together with Nikos Kazantzakis and a five-volume collection of Greek mythology.
