= Jean-Baptiste-Gaspard d'Ansse de Villoison =

18th century French classical scholar (1750–1805)

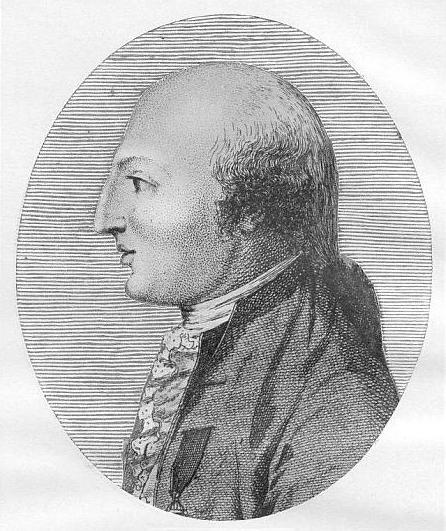
Jean-Baptiste-Gaspard d'Ansse de Villoison

Jean-Baptiste-Gaspard d'Ansse (or Dannse) de Villoison (5 March 1750 (or 1753) – 25 April 1805) was a classical scholar born at Corbeil-sur-Seine, France.

In 1773, he published the Homeric Lexicon of Apollonius the Sophist from a manuscript in the abbey of Saint-Germain-des-Prés. In 1778, his edition of Longus's Daphnis and Chloë was published. He went to Venice in 1781, and spent three years there examining the library, his expenses being paid by the French government.

His chief discovery was a 10th-century manuscript of the Iliad—the famous codex Venetus A, with ancient scholia and marginal notes, indicating supposititious, corrupt or transposed verses. After leaving Venice, he accepted an invitation of the duke of Saxe-Weimar to come to his court. Some of the fruits of his research in the library of the palace were collected into a volume, Epistolae Vinarienses (1783), dedicated to his royal hosts.

Hoping to find a treasure similar to the Venetian Homer in Greece, he returned to Paris to prepare for a journey to the east. He visited Constantinople, Smyrna, the Greek islands, and Mount Athos, but the results did not meet his expectation. In 1786, de Villoison returned to Paris, and in 1788 brought out the Venetus A of Homer, which created a sensation in the learned world. When the French Revolution broke out, being banished from Paris, he lived in retirement in Orléans, occupying himself chiefly with the transcription of the notes in the library of the brothers Valois (Valesius).

Upon the restoration of order, having returned to Paris, he accepted a professorship of modern Greek established by the government, and held it until it was transferred to the Collège de France as the professorship of the ancient and modern Greek languages. He died in 1805, soon after his appointment.

Another work of some importance, Anecdota Graeca (1781), from the Paris and Venice libraries, contains the Ionia (violet garden) of the empress Eudocia, and several fragments of the Neoplatonists Iamblichus and Porphyry, Procopius of Gaza, Choricius, and the Greek grammarians. Materials for an exhaustive work he was contemplating on ancient and modern Greece are preserved in the royal library of Paris.
