= Hartmut Erbse =

German classical scholar (1915–2004)

- Born: 23 November 1915; Rudolstadt, Germany
- Died: 7 July 2004 (aged 88); Trossingen, Germany
- Scientific career
- Fields: Classical philologist
- Notable students: Joachim Latacz

Hartmut Erbse (23 November 1915 – 7 July 2004) was a German classical philologist.

== Life ==
The son of a dentist from Thüringen, Erbse studied classical philology in Hamburg, where he was well known for his lively hat-wear and received his doctorate in 1940. In 1948 he completed his habilitation at Graz with a study of Attic lexica; in the same year he received his first lectureship, in Hamburg. In 1954 he was appointed to a special professorship there, and six years later he was appointed a full professor. In 1965 he accepted an invitation to take the chair of Greek philology at Tübingen, and in 1968 a further invitation to the University of Bonn. He researched and taught there until just before his death. Erbse died, at age 89, on 7 July 2004.

His research was devoted to textual criticism and editions of Greek fragments and scholia, and to interpretation of Homer, Herodotus, and Thucydides. Erbse acted as co-editor of the well-known journals Glotta and Hermes, and in 1965 was one of the editors of the Lexikon der Alten Welt (LAW), alongside Carl Andresen, Olof Gigon, Karl Schefold, Karl Friedrich Stroheker, and Ernst Zinn. With Kurt Latte he published the Lexica Graeca minora, but he remains best known for his masterpiece, a huge seven-volumes critical edition of Iliad's Scholia vetera.

Hartmut Erbse was a Corresponding Fellow of the British Academy and the Academy of Sciences at Göttingen.

== Selected works ==
- (1950) Untersuchungen zu den attizistischen Lexika, Berlin: Akademie-Verlag.
- (1960) Beiträge zur Überlieferung der Iliasscholien, München: Beck.
- (1965) Lexica Graeca minora, Hildesheim: Olms.
- (1969–1983) Scholia Graeca in Homeri Iliadem, Berlin: de Gruyter.
- (1972) Beiträge zum Verständnis der Odyssee, Berlin: de Gruyter.
- (1979) Ausgewählte Schriften zur klassischen Philologie, Berlin-New York: de Gruyter.
- (1980) Festschrift für Hartmut Erbse zum 65. Geburtstag, ed. Joachim Latacz, Würzburg: Schöningh.
- (1984) Studien zum Prolog der euripideischen Tragödie, Berlin: de Gruyter.
- (1986) Untersuchungen zur Funktion der Götter im homerischen Epos, Berlin: de Gruyter.
- (1989) Thukydides-Interpretationen, Berlin: de Gruyter.
- (1991) Fiktion und Wahrheit im Werke Herodots, Göttingen: Vandenhoeck & Ruprecht.
- (1992) Studien zum Verständnis Herodots, Berlin: de Gruyter.
- (1995) Theosophorum Graecorum Fragmenta, Stuttgart: Teubner.
- (2003) Studien zur griechischen Dichtung, Wiesbaden: Steiner.
