= Vilborg =

Vilborg is both a given name and a surname. Notable people with the name include:

- Vilborg Dagbjartsdóttir (1930–2021), Icelandic writer
- Vilborg Davíðsdóttir (born 1965), Icelandic writer
- Vilborg Sverrisdóttir (born 1957), Icelandic freestyle swimmer
- Ebbe Vilborg (1926–2018), Swedish philologist
