= Achille Vogliano =

Italian scholar of classics (1881–1953)

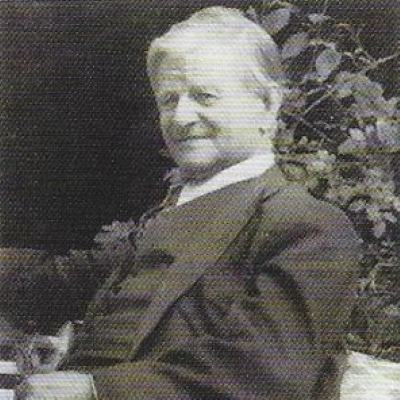
- Born: October 17, 1881
- Died: June 26, 1953 (aged 71)
- Occupation: Archaeologist • papyrologist • university professor
- Spouse: Charlotte Hans
- Children: 2
- Relatives: Mario de Maria

Academic background
- Education: Regia Accademia Scientifico-letteraria (Milan); University of Florence
- Doctoral advisor: Girolamo Vitelli

Academic work
- Discipline: Classics
- Sub-discipline: Papyrology
- Institutions: University of Cagliari; University of Bologna; University of Milan

Achille Vogliano (17 October 1881 – 26 June 1953) was an Italian classical scholar, archaeologist and papyrologist.

== Biography ==
=== Origins and education (1881–1908) ===
Born in Florence, son of an engineer, Vogliano graduated from high school in Milan and enrolled in the local Regia Accademia Scientifico-letteraria (which would become the University of Milan), at the same time taking art classes at the Accademia di Brera. He remained unsure whether to pursue classical studies or his vocation for painting (which however remained a hobby of his), but he eventually graduated in classics in 1906. He was possibly discouraged from becoming a professional painter by his father.

Vogliano enrolled in the University of Florence and specialized in classical philology in 1908, advised by Girolamo Vitelli; later, in 1934, Vogliano recalled Vitelli's classes on Euripides' Electra as memorable, and credited Vitelli with sending him to Naples to work on the Herculaneum papyri. The next year he enrolled in the Royal Italian School of Archaeology in Rome. At the same time he taught in Italian high schools in Corleone (Sicily), Susa (Piedmont) and in Milan, however being frequently exonerated from teaching duties for research purposes which he mostly spent in Naples.

=== World War I and experience in Germany ===
In 1915 he was called to arms and assigned to the Information Service of the Royal Italian Army. After the armistice in 1918 he was sent to Vienna and Berlin, where he came in contact with Hermann Diels and bought the private library of Theodor Gomperz. Vogliano also became friends with some prominent bureaucrats, who eased his staying abroad after his ministerial assignments ended. Thus he could travel to London and back to Berlin after 1920; in the fall of that year he was officially assigned to superintend the constitution of an Institute of Italian Culture in Berlin. The project failed, but Vogliano could meet prominent German scholars such as Paul Maas, Eduard Norden, Robert Philippson, Wilhelm Schubart, and Wilamowitz.

In 1923 he came back to Italy and taught at the Garibaldi high school in Naples, and could restart his researches on Herculaneum papyri. In 1927, he became non-tenured professor in Ancient Greek literature at the University of Cagliari.

=== University tenure ===
In 1929 he was nominated Professor in Ancient Greek literature at the University of Bologna and immediately bought, from Maurice Nahman, some papyri for the university. He also planned a journal, «Studi Italiani di Papirologia», for which he collected papers by Maas, Elias Bickermann, Karl Preisendanz and Dietrich Schäfer. Albeit the first issue was virtually complete (with the proofs already typographically composed and printed), the journal never started, because Vogliano moved to Milan and his successor, Goffredo Coppola, refused to approve it due to personal disagreement with Vogliano.

Vogliano was Professor in Ancient Greek literature at the University of Milan from 1 November 1932 to 31 October 1952, when he retired. However, from 1934 to 1943 — with the placet of Luigi Castiglioni (then-Head of Faculty) and Arrigo Solmi — he was exonerated from didactics, for his archaeological campaigns in Egypt and a planned expedition in Persia. In 1942, he even wrote:

Italian: Agli occhi della mia Direzione Generale e a quelli dei miei colleghi, io ero semplicemente il professore che non faceva lezione.

[To my General Direction and even my colleagues, I simply was a professor who did not teach.]

— Calabi Limentani 2003, p. 238

=== Archaeological excavations in Egypt ===
During his staying in London, Vogliano had met Idris Bell and had learnt from him of the Manichean manuscripts found in Medînet Mâdi, also receiving a positive description of the site by Schubart. In 1933 he was granted the economical support of the Ministry of Education and the city of Milan, and could start an archaeological excavation in Tebtunis, later moving to Medïnet Mâdi. In five weeks the expedition unearthed more than 1000 Greek and Demotic papyri and ostraka, including the famous "Cantina dei papiri".

The most important piece was the roll with the διηγήσεις (diegeseis) of Callimachus' lost poems (P.Primi, no. 18), which he immediately photographed and sent to Vitelli; he complained, however, that the University of Florence held the rights on the papyrus, for the original concession was theirs. Solmi intervened and stated that the papyrus was Milan's, however he could not repair the fracture between Vogliano and Florence, enraging especially Medea Norsa, who went as far as to question — if not openly deny — Vogliano's expertise in papyrology itself:

Italian: ... il caso di Vogliano a Tebtunis; ... un qualsiasi incompetente ... ha approfittato del lavoro preparatorio di parecchi anni di scavo fatto dall'Anti e da Lei!

[... what Vogliano did in Tebtunis; ... just another incompetent man ... has taken advantage of the preparatory excavations made by Anti and You!]

— Letter (1935.10.04) to Evaristo Breccia (Morelli & Pintaudi 1983, p. 646)

The Callimachus papyrus was first published by Norsa and Vitelli in the same 1934. Vogliano returned to Italy in the summer of the same year and immediately planned the next campaign, in Tebtynis and in Medînet Mâdi (where he found the ruins of the ancient city of Narmuthis), finding the temple of Isis-Narmouthis and transcribing the Hymns of Isidoros. He worked in Medînet Mâdi until 1939, when he planned to move to Abusir and to found an Institute of Italian Culture in Cairo. Both projects were stopped by WWII. In 1942 Vogliano led an archaeological expedition in Iran, but was denied support for another expedition on the Black Sea by the Ministry of Education, due to the economic situation in wartimes. Thus, he was forced to return to teaching.

=== After World War II and last years ===
In Milan, Vogliano taught Ancient Greek literature (1932–1934 and 1942–1953) and papyrology (1943–1952). He studied and restored the papyri he had unearthed in Egypt. At the end of the war, after briefly being suspected of Nazi sympathies due to his frequent travels to Germany (where his family resided), he was reinstated as faculty member. In 1945–1946 he founded the Institute of Papyrology, which also offered classes in Egyptology. He returned in Egypt in 1945, but could not start new archaeological campaigns. He thus focused on teaching and research, spending most of his time in the faculty library, training his students on unpublished papyri, and even economically helping them.

In 1947 he became Gastprofessor (visiting professor) at the Free University of Berlin — having declined the same office in Leipzig, invited by Schubart —and in 1952 he was made Honorary Professor in Epigraphy, Papyrology and Greek palaeography. He travelled to Egypt for the last time in the spring of 1953, bringing back some papyri. He died in Berlin after a short illness.

He had married Charlotte (née Hans) in 1930 and they had two sons, Germano and Giulio; the family resided mainly in Zehlendorf. His private library, counting more than 11,000 books plus various offprints and private documents, was gifted by his widow and sons to the University of Milan.

== Research activity ==
Vogliano was primarily an archaeologist and a papyrologist, also publishing on Greek epigraphy. In his career, he paid constant attention to new texts, chiefly Herodas, and almost exclusively published on new findings. He is chiefly remembered for creating the papyrological collections of the universities of Bologna and Milan, for editing the first volume of the University of Milan papyri, and for his work on papyri of various Greek authors, including Herodas, Epicurus' treatise On Nature — which he studied on the Herculaneum papyri, publishing the fragments of five books of the treatise — and Sappho. He contributed to the Papiri della Società Italiana and published papyri containing fragments of Origen and Achilles Tatius, the latter leading to a new date for the author.

Among the papyri he edited, was P.Primi, no. 18, containing the διηγήσεις (summaries) of lost works by Callimachus. The papyrus, found by Vogliano in Tebtynis during his first campaign, was first published from photographies by Vitelli and Norsa, and later re-edited by Vogliano, adding two fragments, in the first volume of the Milan papyri. Two other fragments, from the Milan collection itself, were added in 2001 by Claudio Gallazzi and Luigi Lehnus.

He was one of the first scholars — if not the first — to use a microscope to study papyri, and reproduced himself many of the papyri he studied, drawing them himself.

== Publications by Vogliano (selection) ==
=== Monographs ===
- Vogliano, A. (1908). Ricerche sopra l'ottavo mimiambo (ἐνύπνιον) di Herodas (con un excursus IV. 93-95). Milan: Tip. Antonio Cordani.
- Vogliano, A., ed. (1928). Epicuri et Epicureorum scripta in Herculanensibus papyris servata. Berlin: Weidmann – via archive.org.
- Vogliano, A.; Jouguet, P., eds. (1935). Dal I° volume dei papiri della R. Università di Milano. Florence: Tip. R. Ariani.
- Vogliano, A. (1936). Primo rapporto degli scavi condotti dalla Missione archeologica d'Egitto della R. Università di Milano nella zona di Madīnet Māḍī (campagna inverno e primavera 1935-XIII). Milan: [s.n.]
- Vogliano, A. (1937). Secondo rapporto degli scavi condotti dalla Missione archeologica d'Egitto della R. Università di Milano nella zona di Madīnet Māḍī (campagna inverno e primavera 1936-XIV). Milan: [s.n.]
- Vogliano, A., ed. (1937). Papiri della R. Università di Milano. Vol. I. Milan: Ulrico Hoepli.
  - Reprint: Vogliano, A., ed. (1966) [1937]. Papiri della Università di Milano. P.Mil.Vogl., 1. Milan – Varese: Istituto Editoriale Cisalpino.
- Vogliano, A., ed. (1940). I resti dell'XI° libro del Περὶ φύσεως di Epicuro. Le Caire: Imprimerie de l'IFAO.
- Vogliano, A., ed. (1940). Un papiro storico greco della raccolta milanese e le campagne dei Romani in Etiopia. Milan: Ulrico Hoepli.
- Vogliano, A., ed. (1941). Sappho. Una nuova ode della poetessa. Milan: Ariel.
- Vogliano, A. (1951). La lirica eolica e Pindaro nella critica di Gottfried Hermann. Milan: R. Malfasi.

=== Academic papers ===
- Vogliano, A. (1910). "Spigolature Ercolanesi (Bergk P. Lyr. Gr. III⁴ p. 168 sg.)". SIFC. 18: 285–288 – via archive.org.
- Vogliano, A. (1929). "Frammento logico". In Vitelli, G (ed.). Papiri della Società Italiana. Vol. IX. Florence: Tip. E. Ariani. n. 1095.
- Vogliano, A. (1930). "Ein neues Fragment von Epikur". Archiv für Papyrusforschung und Verwandte Gebiete. 9 (1–2): 1–4. doi:10.1515/apf.1930.9.1-2.1
- Vogliano, A. (1932). "Frammenti di poemetti lirici". In Vitelli, G (ed.). Papiri della Società Italiana. Vol. X. Florence: Tip. E. Ariani. n. 1181.
- Vogliano, A. (1932). "I frammenti del XIV° libro del Περὶ φύσεως di Epicuro". RAIB. 3rd S. 6: 33–75.
- Vogliano, A. (1936). "Frammenti di un nuovo «Gnomologium Epicureum»". SIFC. N. S. 13: 267–282.
- Vogliano, A. (1938a). "Rapporto preliminare della IVª campagna di scavo a Madînet Mâdi (R. Università di Milano)". ASAE. 38: 533–549 – via archive.org.
- Vogliano, A. (1938b). "Un papiro di Achille Tazio". SIFC. N. S. 15: 121–130.
- Vogliano, A. (1939a). "Frammenti di due omelie di Origene". Byzantinisch-neugriechische Jahrbücher. 15: 130–136.
- Vogliano, A. (1939b). "Nuove strofe di Saffo". Philologus. 93: 277–282. doi:10.1524/phil.1938.93.jg.277 = Sappho 1941.
- Vogliano, A. (1939c). "Rapporto preliminare della Vª campagna di scavo a Madînet Mâdi (R. Università di Milano)". ASAE. 39: 687–695.
- Vogliano, A. (1941). "Ancora sulla nuova ode di Saffo". SIFC. N. S. 18: 3–4.
- Vogliano, A. (1948a). "Dai papiri dell'Università di Milano". Acme. 1 (1–2): 195–231.
- Vogliano, A. (1948b). "Massime di vita". Acme. 1 (1–2): 260 (re-edited in Cinotti, Colombo & Vogliano 1953, pp. 524–525).
- Vogliano, A. (1953a). "I resti del II° libro del Περὶ φύσεως di Epicuro". Prolegomena. 2: 59–98.
- Vogliano, A. (1953b). "Il papiro Bolognese n° 3". Acme. 5 (3): 385–418.
- Cinotti, A.; Colombo, A. M.; Vogliano, A. (1953). "Papyrologica". Studi in onore di V. Arangio-Ruiz nel XLV anno del suo insegnamento. Vol. II. Naples: Jovene. pp. 497–525.
- Vogliano, A. (1954). "Gli studi filologici epicurei nell'ultimo cinquantennio". MH. 11 (3): 188–194. JSTOR 24812034.
- Vogliano, A. (1956). Häsler, B. (ed.). "I resti del XV libro del Περὶ φύσεως di Epicuro". Philologus. 100: 253–70. doi:10.1524/phil.1956.100.12.253.

== Bibliography ==
- Achilles Tatius (1955). Vilborg, E. (ed.). Leucippe and Clitophon. Studia Graeca et Latina Gothoburgensia, 1. Stockholm: Almqvist & Wiksell.
- Bernand, É., ed. (1969). Inscriptions métriques de l'Égypte gréco-romaine. Recherches sur la poésie épigrammatique des Grecs en Égypte. Annales Littéraires de l'Université de Besançon, 98. Paris: Les Belles Lettres.
- Cazzaniga, I., ed. (1965). Papiri della Università degli Studi di Milano. P.Mil.Vogl., 3. Milan – Varese: Istituto Editoriale Cisalpino.
- Colonna, A. (1940). "Due papiri di Achille Tazio". BPEC. 1: 73–76.
- Gallazzi, Cl. (1990). "La "Cantina dei papiri" di Tebtynis e ciò che essa conteneva". ZPE (in Italian). 80: 283–288. JSTOR 20187234.
- Gallazzi, Cl. (2007). "Achille Vogliano (1881-1953)". In Capasso, M. (ed.). Hermae • Scholars and Scholarship in Papyrology. Biblioteca degli «Studi di Egittologia e di Papirologia», 4 (in Italian). Vol. I. Pisa: Giardini Editori e Stampatori. pp. 247–262. ISBN 88-427-1443-7.
- Gallazzi, Cl.; Lehnus, L. (2001). "Due nuovi frammenti delle diegeseis. Approssimazioni al III libro degli Aitia di Callimaco". ZPE (in Italian). 137: 7–18. JSTOR 20190924.
- Gallazzi, Cl.; Lehnus, L., eds. (2003). Achille Vogliano cinquant'anni dopo. Quaderni di Acme, 59 (in Italian). Vol. I. Milan: Cisalpino. ISBN 8832330075.
  - Calabi Limentani, I. (2003). "Achille Vogliano e l'Università di Milano". Achille Vogliano cinquant'anni dopo. Vol. I. pp. 231–254.
  - Lehnus, L. (2003). "Vogliano filologo e la Germania". Achille Vogliano cinquant'anni dopo. Vol. I. pp. 9–52 — reprint: Lehnus, L. (2012). Incontri con la filologia del passato. Paradosis, 19. Bari: Dedalo. pp. 181–227. ISBN 978-88-22-05819-5.
  - Lehnus, L.; Puricelli, F. (2003). "Cronologia di Achille Vogliano". Achille Vogliano cinquant'anni dopo. Vol. I. pp. XV–XX.
  - Negri, A (2003). "Achille Vogliano disegnatore e pittore". Achille Vogliano cinquant'anni dopo. Vol. I. pp. 309–319.
- Morelli, D.; Pintaudi, R., eds. (1983). Cinquant'anni di papirologia in Italia: carteggi Breccia – Comparetti – Norsa – Vitelli (in Italian). Vol. I–II. Naples: Bibliopolis. ISBN 88-7088-117-2.
- Norsa, M.; Vitelli, G., eds. (1934). Διηγήσεις di poemi di Callimaco in un papiro di Tebtynis (in Italian). Florence: Tip. E. Ariani.
- Vanderlip, V. F., ed. (1972). The Four Greek Hymns of Isidorus and the Cult of Isis. American Studies in Papyrology, 12. Toronto: A. M. Hakkert Ltd. LCCN 74-159261.
