= Giovanni Orlandi (medievalist) =

Italian medievalist (1938–2007)

Giovanni Orlandi (11 September 1938 – 13 November 2007) was an Italian medievalist and philologist, who specialized in Latin literature of the Middle Ages.

Born in Milan, Orlandi attended the Liceo Classico Giuseppe Parini and the University of Milan, graduating in 1962 with a dissertation in Medieval Studies tutored by Giovanni Martini. He worked as a research fellow until 1969 when he became professore incaricato (appointed professor) of Medieval Latin literature. From 1964 to 1965, he won a scholarship to spend a year abroad at LMU Munich, where he was tutored by Bernhard Bischoff. Habilitated in 1971, he became a full professor of Medieval Latin philology at the University of Calabria in 1975 and again at the University of Milan in 1977. He served as deputy chair of the Società Internazionale per lo Studio del Medioevo Latino (SISMEL) and a member of the scientific committee of the Fondazione Ezio Franceschini. He went into early retirement in 2006 and died in 2007 after a brief illness. His wife Isabella Gualandri was professor of Latin literature at the University of Milan; his brother Tito Orlandi is an Emeritus of Coptic studies at the Sapienza University of Rome. Paolo Chiesa, one of his students, occupied the Milan chair of Medieval Latin literature following Orlandi's retirement.

Orlandi was a textual critic and a theorist of textual criticism applied to Medieval Latin texts. He published critical editions of the excerpts from the Latin translation of the Clementine recognitions, of Rodulfus Glaber's Histories and of the Collations by Peter Abelard, and translations of Leon Battista Alberti's treatise On Architecture and of the prefaces to the Aldine editions. In 1968, he published the prolegomena to a critical edition of the Navigatio Sancti Brendani, which was posthumously edited by Rossana Guglielmetti. His Kleine Schriften was being collected as he succumbed to his illness.

== Main publications ==
- Alberti, Leon Battista (1989) [1966]. Orlandi, G.; Portoghesi, Paolo (eds.). L'architettura. Milan: Il Polifilo.
- Johannes Hymmonides; Gaudericus Veliternus; Leo Ostiensis (1968). Orlandi, G. (ed.). Excerpta ex Clementinis recognitionibus a Tyrannio Rufino translatis. Testi e documenti per lo studio dell'antichità, 24. Milan – Varese: Istituto Editoriale Cisalpino.
- Orlandi, G. (1968). Navigatio sancti Brendani. Testi e documenti per lo studio dell'antichità, 38. Vol. I. Introduzione. Milan – Varese: Istituto Editoriale Cisalpino.
- Manuzio, Aldo (1975). Dionisotti, Carlo; Orlandi, G. (eds.). Dediche, prefazioni, note ai testi. Milan: Il Polifilo.
- Löfstedt, Einar (1980). Orlandi, G. (ed.). Il latino tardo. Aspetti e problemi. Translated by Giorgetti Cima, Carmen. Brescia: Paideia. ISBN 978-88-39-40722-1.
- Orlandi, G. (1980). "Baucis et Traso". Commedie latine del XII e XIII secolo. Vol. III. Genoa: Istituto di Filologia Classica e Medievale. pp. 245–303.
- Rodolfo il Glabro (1989). Cavallo, Guglielmo; Orlandi, G. (eds.). Cronache dell'anno Mille (Storie). Milano & Rome: Fondazione Lorenzo Valla • Arnoldo Mondadori editore. ISBN 88-04-29883-9.
- Gualandri, I.; Orlandi, G. (1998). "Arnolfo di Orléans. Lidia". Commedie latine del XII e XIII secolo. Vol. VI. Genoa: D.AR.FI.CL.ET. pp. 111–318.
- Abelard, Peter (2001). Marenbon, John; Orlandi, G. (eds.). Collationes. Oxford: Clarendon Press. doi:10.1093/actrade/9780198205791.book.1. ISBN 978-01-98-20579-1.
- Orlandi, G. (2008). Chiesa, P.; Fagnoni, Anna Maria; Guglielmetti, R. E.; Maggioni, Giovanni Paolo (eds.). Scritti di filologia mediolatina. Millennio Medievale, 77 • Strumenti e Studi, 19. Milan – Varese: SISMEL • Edizioni del Galluzzo. ISBN 978-88-8450-284-1. (Kleine Schriften)
- Guglielmetti, R. E.; Orlandi, G., eds. (2014). Navigatio sancti Brendani. Alla scoperta dei segreti meravigliosi del mondo. Per Verba. Testi mediolatini con traduzione, 30. Firenze: SISMEL • Edizioni del Galluzzo. ISBN 978-88-8450-556-9. (†)
- Guglielmetti, R. E.; Orlandi, G., eds. (2017). Navigatio sancti Brendani. Editio maior. Millennio Medievale, 114 • Testi, 29. Firenze: SISMEL • Edizioni del Galluzzo. ISBN 978-88-8450-801-0. (†)
