= Isabella Gualandri =

Italian Latinist

Isabella Gualandri (born 15 July 1938) is an Italian Latinist, retired professor of the University of Milan.

Gualandri graduated cum laude in Classics from the State University in 1962, tutored by Ignazio Cazzaniga. She was nominated Assistante volontaria (research assistant) in Latin literature at the Faculty of Classics. In 1963 she was habilitated to high school teaching and was nominated teaching assistant at the Faculty of Foreign Languages of the Bocconi University. In 1966 she was nominated Assistante ordinaria (tenured research assistant) at the State University and in 1969 she was assigned to teach Latin literature III. In 1971 she was habilitated to university teaching of Classical Philology (libera docenza), and became full tenured professor in 1976. She retired in 2010, continuing teaching for three years (2010–2013) as lecturer on contract.

In 1973 and again in 1975 she won the prize for scientific production inside her faculty. In 1983-85 and again in 1990-96 she was Director of the Institute of Classical Philology; from 2003 to 2010 she was the general editor of the faculty journal "Acme". She is full member of the Istituto Lombardo and of the Accademia Ambrosiana, Classe di Studi Ambrosiani, and Senior Member of Robinson College, Cambridge.

She edited indexes to John Tzetzes's scholia to Lycophron and two late antique paraphraseis of Oppian's Halieutica and Nicander's Theriaca; she specialized in Latin literature of the late antiquity.

== Selected works ==
- 1962 - Index nominum propriorum quae in scholiis Tzetzianis ad Lycophronem laudantur (Milan, Cisalpino)
- 1965 - Index glossarum quae in scholiis Tzetzianis ad Lycophronem laudantur (Milan, Cisalpino)
- 1965 - Le componenti dello stile tragico di Ennio (Studi Classici e Orientali, 14, 100–119)
- 1968 - Incerti auctoris in Oppiani Halieutica paraphrasis (Milan, Cisalpino)
- 1968 - Eutecnii paraphrasis in Nicandri Theriaca (Milan, Cisalpino)
- 1971 - Claudiano (Milan, Cisalpino)
- 1979 - Furtiva lectio: studi su Sidonio Apollinare (Milan, Cisalpino)
- 1990 - Contributi sulla commedia elegiaca 'Lidia'. Questioni letterarie e testuali (Paideia, 45, 199–238; with G. Orlandi)
- 1993 - Politica, cultura e religione nell'impero romano (secoli IV-VI) tra Oriente e Occidente. Atti del II Convegno dell'Associazione di Studi Tardoantichi (Naples, D'Auria) (ed. with F. Conca, G. Lozza)
- 1998 - Arnolfo d'Orléans: Lidia. Edizione critica, in Commedie latine del XII e XIII secolo, VI (Genoa, D.AR.FI.CL.ET.; with G. Orlandi)
- 2002 - Tra IV e V secolo: studi sulla cultura latina tardoantica (Milan, Cisalpino)
- 2005 - Nuovo e antico nella cultura greco-latina di IV-VI secolo (Milan, Cisalpino) (ed. with F. Conca, R. Passarella)
