= Galvano Fiamma =

Italian monk and chronicler (1283–1344)

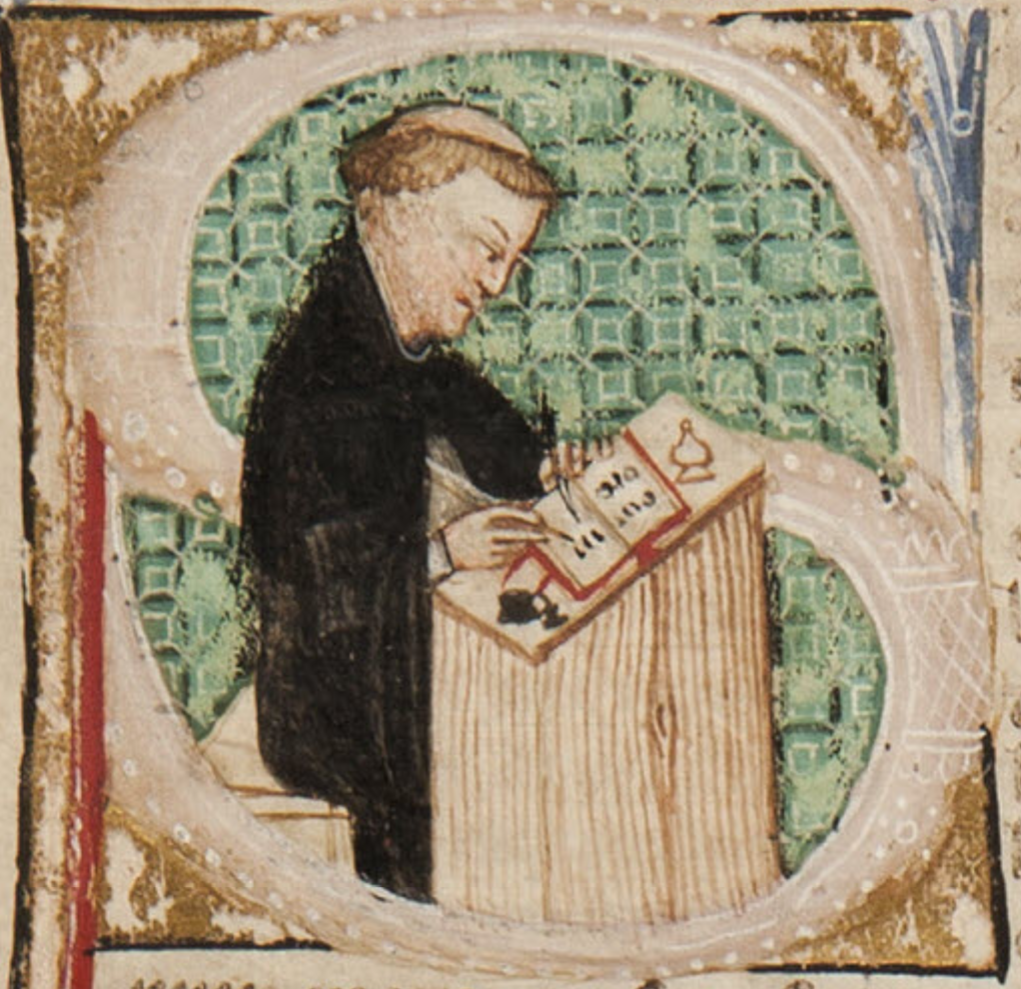
- Born: 1283; Milan
- Died: 1344 (aged 60–61); Milan
- Education: Doctor of Theology
- Occupations: Dominican friar and chronicler

Galvano Fiamma (Latin: Galvaneus Flamma; 1283–1344) was an Italian Dominican and chronicler of Milan. He appears to have been the first European in the Mediterranean area to describe the New World. His numerous historical writings include the Chronica Galvagnana, the Chronicon extravagans de antiquitatibus Mediolani, the Chronicon maius, and the Manipolus florum seu Historia Mediolanensis; he is also known for a map of Milan c. 1330.

== Biography ==
Fiamma was born in 1283 to a family of notaries in Milan. At a young age, he joined the Dominican monastery of Saint Eustorgio, where he studied and eventually became a lector sacrae theologiae.

After a brief period in Pavia, where he taught theology between 1308 and 1313, he returned to Milan, where he lectured on various subjects, including ethics, rhetoric and economics. Fiamma was appointed chaplain to the Archbishop of Milan Giovanni Visconti in 1339. He died in Milan in 1344.

== Writings ==
He wrote several chronicles dealing with the history of Milan and exalting the Visconti, who by his day had in effect become its ruling dynasty.

His book, Cronica universalis, written sometime between 1339 and 1345, includes a passage in which he describes Iceland, Greenland, and Markland:

Further northwards there is the Ocean, a sea with many islands where a great quantity of peregrine falcons and gyrfalcons live. These islands are located so far north that the Polar Star remains behind you, toward the south. Sailors who frequent the seas of Denmark and Norway say that northwards, beyond Norway, there is Iceland; further ahead there is an island named Grolandia, where the Polar Star remains behind you, toward the south. The governor of this island is a bishop. In this land, there is neither wheat nor wine nor fruit; people live on milk, meat, and fish. They dwell in subterranean houses and do not venture to speak loudly or to make any noise, for fear that wild animals hear and devour them. There live huge white bears, which swim in the sea and bring shipwrecked sailors to the shore. There live white falcons capable of great flights, which are sent to the emperor of Katai. Further westwards there is another land, named Marckalada, where giants live; in this land, there are buildings with such huge slabs of stone that nobody could build with them, except huge giants. There are also green trees, animals and a great quantity of birds. However, no sailor was ever able to know anything for sure about this land or about its features. From all these facts it is clear that there are settlements at the Arctic pole.

Until 2021, when this passage was discovered, there had been no evidence that anyone outside Northern Europe had heard of Markland before Columbus’s voyage in 1492. Paolo Chiesa, a professor of Medieval Latin Literature at Milan University, believes these accounts of the New World likely came from seafarers in the port city of Genoa.

Also in the Cronica universalis, Galvano claims the Vivaldi Brothers reached Ethiopia.

== Sources ==
This article originated as a translation of this version of its counterpart in the Italian Wikipedia.
