= Ignazio Cazzaniga =

Italian classicist (1911–1974)

- Born: August 31, 1911; Sampierdarena, Genoa, Liguria, Kingdom of Italy
- Died: July 25, 1974 (aged 62); Rapallo, Genoa, Liguria, Italy
- Occupation: University professor

Academic background
- Education: University of Milan
- Thesis: Il mito di Procne e Filomela nella tradizione greca e romana
- Doctoral advisor: Luigi Castiglioni

Academic work
- Discipline: Classics
- Sub-discipline: Classical philology
- Institutions: University of Milan; University of Pisa
- Notable students: Edda Bresciani; Isabella Gualandri

Ignazio Cazzaniga (31 August 1911 – 25 July 1974) was an Italian classicist, philologist and university professor, who taught Latin literature and Classical philology at the University of Milan.

A prolific textual critic, he published critical editions of Catullus, St. Ambrose and Antoninus Liberalis.

== Biography ==
Born in Sampierdarena, he enrolled at the University of Milan in 1928, where studied classics and graduated in 1933, tutored by Luigi Castiglioni; his dissertation was titled "Il mito di Procne e Filomela nella tradizione greca e romana" [Procne's and Philomela's Myth in Greek and Roman Tradition]. (Note: In the Italian university system of the time, there was no distinction between undergraduate and graduate studies, nor between graduate and Ph.D. Courses lasted four years without interruption, and graduate students received the title of "dottore" ('Doctor').) After graduating, he began teaching in Monza high school and served as complement non-commissioned officer in the Italian Army. He fought in Greece during the World War II; captured in Rhodes, he was sent to Germany as prisoner and remained there until 1945.

In 1951, Cazzaniga was nominated Professor of Latin literature at the University of Pisa. The next year he moved back to Milan, replacing Castiglioni; in 1957 he also was assigned to teach Classical philology, and taught both courses until his death. In the 1952/1953 academic year he taught at the University of Pisa again as substitute professor. In 1966, the University of Milan created a second Chair of Latin literature which was assigned to Alberto Grilli, who also had studied under Castiglioni.

In 1968, during the protests, a group of students occupied his office in the University, and wrote "HIC MANEBIMVS OPTIME" (Note: A quote from Livy, V 55.) on the wall. Cazzaniga, when arrived to the office, is quoted to have replied "Anca mi!" ("Me too!", in Milanese dialect) to the occupiers and to have started a conversation influenced by Plautus' irony and comic.

From 1961/62 to 1966/67, Cazzaniga was director of the Institute of Papyrology of the University of Milan, and from 1969/1970 to his death, he directed the Institute of Classical Philology (still also directing the Institute of Papyrology as 'direttore incaricato'). A brilliant and hard-working administrator, he reorganized the activities of the Institute and encouraged the publication of the papyri discovered in Tebtunis by Achille Vogliano before WWII, also arranging the purchase of new pieces to enlarge the collection. He edited the reprint of the first volume of the University of Milan papyri and organized the preparation of further volumes in the series, as well as collateral works. Furthermore, he encouraged the editing and publication of the Demotic papyri of the Milan collection, encouraged the foundation and the development of a Coptic studies branch of the institute and helped organizing, together with the Università Cattolica, the International Congress of Papyrology in 1965. Under his term as director, the Institute of Papyrology also reopened the archeological excavations in Medînet Madi, where they worked until 1970 and again, after Cazzaniga's death, in 1976. During his tenure as director of the Institute of Classical Philology, he also planned a series of publications specifically designed to host the research outputs of its graduate students; the series debuted in 1977 and produced three miscellaneous volumes in five years (Scripta philologa 1977, 1980, 1982).

In 1956 he was nominated correspondent of the Istituto Lombardo, and in 1965 was promoted to full membership; in 1968 he entered the directory board of the Association Internationale des Papyrologues. He had several scholars and collaborators, including Egyptologist Edda Bresciani (who directed the archeological excavations in Egypt, on his behalf), Isabella Gualandri and Mario Geymonat. (Note: Geymonat (1941–2012) taught in the universities of Milan, Calabria, Siena and Venice and published a critical edition of Vergil's works (Turin 1973; 2nd ed. Rome 2008).)

Ignazio Cazzaniga died in Rapallo in the summer of 1974, while on vacation, for a post-operative embolus. Other than a scholar, he was an original author and composed short poems both in Greek and Latin, which (with the exception of a few) he left unpublished. His books and some unpublished documents are now held by the University of Milan and the Catholic University of Milan.

== Research activity ==
Cazzaniga studied both Greek and Latin literature, specializing in Hellenistic, Roman and late antique literature. However, he had an uncommonly wide range of interests and wrote on Latin medieval and – occasionally – Byzantine matters. He also studied Christian and apocryphal literature, mainly Christian Latin literature and the Gospel of Nicodemus (of which he had planned a critical edition). He wrote on the fragments of Aeschylus and Sophocles, Euphorion, Callimachus, and Parthenius, on Apuleius and other authors, including Pindar, Ennius, Lucan, Ovid, Statius, Cassiodorus, Claudian, Corippus, the Christian bishop Asterius, Nonnus and the Appendix Vergiliana, with contributions on the Pervigilium Veneris and the Ciris. He studied Medieval lexicography and wrote on Papias.

He published critical editions of Catullus, of the De lapsu Susannae, of the virginal homilies of St. Ambrose of Milan, of the Priapeia with the Pervirgilium Veneris, of the Vita s. Emiliani written by Braulio of Zaragoza and of Antoninus Liberalis, also publishing textual criticism on the latter. In his later years he became interested in Nicander of Colophon, published several contributions on the text and the scholia and interpretative essays on his poems and was working on a critical edition, which he couldn't complete.

Cazzaniga was never a papyrologist, but

Italian: ...un filologo che ebbe chiara coscienza del nesso ineliminabile di filologia e papirologia – ed egualmente di epigrafia e numismatica – e quindi del fatto che una valutazione della civiltà antica senza papiri – come senza iscrizioni o monete – rimarrebbe unilaterale e certamente fallace.

[... a philologist with a solid knowledge of the unbreakable link between philology and papyrology — as well as epigraphy and numismatics — thus of the fact that evaluating th antiquity without papyri — or without inscriptions, or money — would be unilateral and fallacious.]

— Gigante 1976, p. 26

In 1937, he edited six literary papyri for the first volume of the University of Milan papyri and published two essays in scientific periodicals, continuing his researches in the following years with some essays on texts preserved by papyri and publishing more literary fragments from the Milan collection. In 1965 and 1967, he edited two volumes of the University of Milan papyri (P.Mil.Vogl. III and P.Mil.Vogl. IV), contributing to the former with the edition of five pieces; he also had planned the general structure for P.Mil.Vogl. VII, appeared in 1981. Occasionally, he wrote on numismatics.

Other than the critical editions, he published monographs on St. Ambrose's style, on the myth of Itys in Greek and Latin literatures and on the manuscript tradition of the De lapsu Susannae. In 1962 he published a History of Latin literature. At the time of his death, he was working on an illustrated edition of the fragments of Nossis and on a translation of E. Lobel and D. Page's Poetarum Lesbiorum fragmenta, both appeared posthumously. In Milan, he also launched and directed a series of scientific publications, "Testi e documenti per lo studio dell'antichità", which he directed until his death; occasionally, he revised and critically contributed to the monographs.

His bibliography, which has been collected by Massimo Gioseffi in 1993, counts more than 230 titles. Two essays of his on Virgil, originally published in the 1960s, were re-edited in the year 2000. (Note: The original publications were Cazzaniga 1960a and Cazzaniga 1960b. See Gioseffi 2000, pp. 13–29 for a survey of Cazzaniga's researches on Vergil.) At the time of his death, he was working on Procopius and Pytheas.

== Honors ==
Cazzaniga was member of the Istituto Lombardo and of the Association Internationale des Papyrologues. Three years after his death, the Institute of Classical Philology of the University of Milan started a series of publications whose first volume, Scripta philologa (1977), was dedicated to him as a Gedenkschrift. The series aimed at publishing scholarly articles by graduate students of the Faculty of Classics, again as planned by Cazzaniga. (Note: Only vols. II (1980) and III (1982) came out.) The same institution had planned a reprint of his scripta minora and the edition of his unfinished critical edition of Nicander too, but neither was ever completed.

== Works by Cazzaniga ==
The bibliography was collected and listed chronologically by Gioseffi (1993, pp. 6–23). The following list includes his scholarly works arranged thematically; literary compositions and extemporal/occasional contributions are omitted.

=== Critical editions ===
- Catullus Veronensis (1941). Cazzaniga, I. (ed.). Liber. Corpus scriptorum Latinorum Paravianum. Augustae Taurinorum: in aedibus Paraviae.
  - Catullus Veronensis (1945). Cazzaniga, I. (ed.). Liber. Corpus scriptorum Latinorum Paravianum (2nd ed.). Augustae Taurinorum: in aedibus Paraviae.
  - Catullus Veronensis (1956). Cazzaniga, I. (ed.). Liber. Corpus scriptorum Latinorum Paravianum (3rd ed.). Augustae Taurinorum: in aedibus Paraviae.
- Auctor incertus (1948). Cazzaniga, I. (ed.). De lapsu Susannae (De lapsu virginis consacratae). Corpus scriptorum Latinorum Paravianum. Augustae Taurinorum: in aedibus Paraviae.
- Ambrosius Mediolanensis (1948). Cazzaniga, I. (ed.). De virginibus libri tres. Corpus scriptorum Latinorum Paravianum. Augustae Taurinorum: in aedibus Paraviae.
- Ambrosius Mediolanensis (1954). Cazzaniga, I. (ed.). De virginitate liber unus. Corpus scriptorum Latinorum Paravianum. Augustae Taurinorum: in aedibus Paraviae.
- Cazzaniga, I., ed. (1959). Carmina ludicra Romanorum. Pervirgilium Veneris • Priapea. Corpus scriptorum Latinorum Paravianum. Augustae Taurinorum: in aedibus Paraviae. (Note: This is a partial re-edition of a volume published by Carlo Pascal in the same series (1918; 3rd ed. 1932), which also included the anonymous carmen De rosis nascentibus. See Carmina 1959, p. v)
- Antoninus Liberalis (1962). Cazzaniga, I. (ed.). Metamorphoseon Synagoge. Testi e Documenti per lo Studio dell'Antichità, 3. Verborum indicem adiecit locupletissimum A. Crugnola. Milano – Varese: Istituto Editoriale Cisalpino.

=== P.Mil.Vogl. ===
- Cazzaniga, I. (1937). "1. Omero, A 39–55". In Vogliano, A. (ed.). Papiri della Regia Università di Milano. Vol. 1. Milano: Antonino Giuffré. pp. 1–2.
- Cazzaniga, I. (1937). "2. Omero, B 155–209". In Vogliano, A. (ed.). Papiri della Regia Università di Milano. Vol. 1. Milano: Antonino Giuffré. pp. 2–4.
- Cazzaniga, I. (1937). "3. Omero, Γ 106–126". In Vogliano, A. (ed.). Papiri della Regia Università di Milano. Vol. 1. Milano: Antonino Giuffré. pp. 5–6.
- Cazzaniga, I. (1937). "4. Omero, H 232–249". In Vogliano, A. (ed.). Papiri della Regia Università di Milano. Vol. 1. Milano: Antonino Giuffré. pp. 6–7.
- Cazzaniga, I. (1937). "5. Omero, Ψ 451–462". In Vogliano, A. (ed.). Papiri della Regia Università di Milano. Vol. 1. Milano: Antonino Giuffré. p. 7.
- Cazzaniga, I. (1937). "6. Apollonio Rodio, Arg. I 699–719". In Vogliano, A. (ed.). Papiri della Regia Università di Milano. Vol. 1. Milano: Antonino Giuffré. pp. 8–10.
- Cazzaniga, I. (1961). "45. Frammento di scholion a Nicandro, Theriaka vv. 526–29". In Castiglioni, L. (ed.). Papiri della Università degli Studi di Milano. P.Mil.Vogl., II. Milano: Antonino Giuffré. pp. 32–39.
- Cazzaniga, I. (1961). "49. Frammento di grammatico". In Castiglioni, L. (ed.). Papiri della Università degli Studi di Milano. P.Mil.Vogl., II. Milano: Antonino Giuffré. pp. 50–53.
- Cazzaniga, I., ed. (1965). Papiri della Università degli Studi di Milano. P.Mil.Vogl., III. Milano – Varese: Istituto Editoriale Cisalpino.
  - Cazzaniga, I. (1965). "119. Frammento di scholion a Omero, Κ 305–346". In Cazzaniga, I. (ed.). Papiri della Università degli Studi di Milano. P.Mil.Vogl., 3. Milano – Varese: Istituto Editoriale Cisalpino. p. 14.
  - Cazzaniga, I. (1965). "121. Apollonio Rodio, Argon. III, 1291–1302 + 1302 a, b, c". In Cazzaniga, I. (ed.). Papiri della Università degli Studi di Milano. P.Mil.Vogl., III. Milano – Varese: Istituto Editoriale Cisalpino. pp. 16–18.
  - Cazzaniga, I. (1965). "122. Frammento di tragedia ignota". In Cazzaniga, I. (ed.). Papiri della Università degli Studi di Milano. P.Mil.Vogl., III. Milano – Varese: Istituto Editoriale Cisalpino. pp. 19–20.
  - Cazzaniga, I. (1965). "123. Frammenti di encomia a Minosse, Radamanto e Tideo". In Cazzaniga, I. (ed.). Papiri della Università degli Studi di Milano. P.Mil.Vogl., III. Milano – Varese: Istituto Editoriale Cisalpino. pp. 21–49.
  - Cazzaniga, I. (1965). "126. Due frammenti di commento a poeta ignoto". In Cazzaniga, I. (ed.). Papiri della Università degli Studi di Milano. P.Mil.Vogl., III. Milano – Varese: Istituto Editoriale Cisalpino. pp. 55–56.
- Cazzaniga, I., ed. (1967). Papiri della Università degli Studi di Milano. P.Mil.Vogl., IV. Milano – Varese: Istituto Editoriale Cisalpino.

=== Monographs ===
- Cazzaniga, I. (1948). Note ambrosiane. Appunti intorno allo stile delle omelie virginali. Milano – Varese: Istituto Editoriale Cisalpino.
- Cazzaniga, I. (1950). La saga di Itis nella tradizione letteraria e mitografica greco-romana. Vol. 1: La tradizione letteraria e mitografica da Omero a Nonno Panopolitano. In appendice: Osservazioni intorno alla composizione dello Hylas di Draconzio. Milano – Varese: Istituto Editoriale Cisalpino.
- Cazzaniga, I. (1950). La tradizione manoscritta del «De lapsu Susannae» (con nuovo apparato critico). Augustae Taurinorum: in aedibus Paraviae.
- Cazzaniga, I. (1951). La saga di Itis nella tradizione letteraria e mitografica greco-romana. Vol. 2: L'episodio di Procne nel libro sesto delle Metamorfosi di Ovidio. Ricerche intorno alla tecnica poetica ovidiana. Milano – Varese: Istituto Editoriale Cisalpino.
- Cazzaniga, I. (1962). Storia della letteratura latina. Milano: Nuova accademia editrice.
  - Cazzaniga, I.; Grilli, A. (1969). Storia della letteratura latina (2nd ed.). Milano: Nuova accademia editrice.

=== Translations ===
- Cazzaniga, I. (1977). Gigante, M. (ed.). Nosside. Calabria classica, 1. Illustrated by Nanna Medda. S.l.: Calabria/Cultura.
- Poetarum lesbiorum fragmenta (Carminum Sapphicorum et Alcaicorum fragmenta). Translated by Cazzaniga, I. Illustrated by Nanna Medda. Milano: Istituto Editoriale Cisalpino. 1978.

=== Articles ===
Journals are abbreviated according to the following sigla established by the "Année Philologique":

- A&R = Atene e Roma. Rassegna trimestrale dell'Associazione Italiana di Cultura Classica (Firenze)
- AIPhO = Annuaire de l'Institut de Philologie et d'Histoire Orientales et Slaves (Université Libre de Bruxelles)
- AMV = Atti e memorie dell'Accademia Nazionale Virgiliana di Scienze, Lettere ed Arti (Mantova)
- ArchClass = Archeologia Classica (Roma)
- ASNP = Annali della Scuola Normale Superiore di Pisa, Classe di Lettere e Filosofia (Pisa)
- Athenaeum = Athenaeum. Studi di letteratura e storia dell'antichità (Como)
- BENC = Bollettino del comitato per la preparazione dell'Edizione Nazionale dei testi classici (Roma)
- CE = Chronique d'Égypte (Bruxelles)
- GB = Grazer Beiträge (Horn)
- GIF = Giornale Italiano di Filologia (Roma)
- NAC = Numismatica e Antichità Classiche (Lugano)
- Paideia = Paideia. Rivista letteraria di informazione bibliografica (Brescia)
- PP = La Parola del Passato (Naples)
- RFIC = Rivista di Filologia e di Istruzione Classica (Torino)
- RIL = Rendiconti dell'Istituto Lombardo. Classe di Lettere e Scienze Morali e Storiche (Milan)
- RIN = Rivista Italiana di Numismatica (Milan)
- SCO = Studi Classici e Orientali (Pisa)
- SIFC = Studi Italiani di Filologia Classica (Florence)
- SPh = Studies in Philology (Chapel Hill, N.C.)
- VChr = Vetera Christianorum (Leiden)
- WS = Wiener Studien (Wien)

All entries are arranged chronologically and, for multiple articles published in the same year, alphabetically. Articles by Cazzaniga and other contributors follow those by Cazzaniga only.

- Cazzaniga, I. (1933). "De Niobes Aeschyli fragmento nuper edito". RIL. 66: 843–852.
- Cazzaniga, I. (1934). "Frammenti del Tereo di Sofocle nel papiro di Favorino?". RIL. 67: 193–198.
- Cazzaniga, I. (1935a). "Influsso della Medea di Euripide sul Tereo di Sofocle". RIL. 68: 433–438.
- Cazzaniga, I. (1935b). "Intorno ai nuovi frammenti euforionei (PSI: Vitelli-Norsa: Ann. Scuola Norm. Sup. Pisa; Lett. IV, 1935, 1, sgg.)". RIL. 68: 769–776.
- Cazzaniga, I. (1937a). "Dai papiri della R. Università di Milano". RIL. 70: 129–132. (Note: Edition of a papyrus containing Aeschines, "Against Ctesiphon", §§86–87. Re-edited by Mariangela Vandoni as P. Mil. Vogl. II 41.)
- Cazzaniga, I. (1937b). "Torbidi giudaici nell'Egitto Romano del secondo secolo di Cristo: un papiro della R. Università di Milano". AIPhO. 5: 159–167.
- Cazzaniga, I. (1938–1939). "I codici ambrosiani della biblioteca Capitolare della basilica di Monza". Sant'Ambrogio. 1: 645–651.
- Cazzaniga, I. (1939a). "I: Rhetorum flosculi; II: Observationes quaedam criticae ad aliquos scriptores". Athenaeum. 17 (27): 41–49.
- Cazzaniga, I. (1939b). "Varia graeco-latina – I". RIL. 72: 88–108. (Note: "Un codice miscellaneo della Bibl. Capitolare di Monza contenente le Epistole ad familiares di Cicerone" – "Iscrizione votiva scoperta nei Propilei di Cirene" – "Due iscrizioni funerarie greche" – "Intorno alla parentela dei codd. 'G' e 'P' della Vita di S. Filareto di Niceta d'Amnia" [sic] – "Osservazioni critiche ad un passo di Pausania (I, 18, 1), Apollodoro (1, 9, 7-1, 89 W.); parallelo a Virg. Buc. 2,48" – "Emendazioni al testo di Adriano Retore, di Severo, di Niceforo Basilace".)
- Cazzaniga, I. (1942). "Varia graeco-latina – III". RIL. 75: 349–366. (Note: "Collazione dell'Ambros. D 267 Inf. (Priapea), dell'Ambros. S 81 Sup. (Pervirgilium Veneris), del Modoeziano C 1/61 (Ambrosii, De Paradiso), del Modoeziano C 23/141 (Augustini, Sermones 307–308 = Migne, PL, XXXVIII, 1406)" – "Osservazioni a passi di alcuni scrittori: Cassiodoro, Hist. Tripart. (= Migne, PL, LXIX, 1073 [= pp. 394–395 Hanslik]); Anonymus Progymnasmata (= Rhet. Gr. Walz 1, 600, 19); PSI, XI, 1208.7 (Niobe di Eschilo); Pap. Bruxell. Inv. E 7162 (= Mél. Boisacq, 1, 493)".)
- Cazzaniga, I. (1949). "Il supplizio del miele e delle formiche: un motivo novellistico nelle Metamorfosi di Apuleio (VIII, 22)". SPh. 46 (1): 1–5. JSTOR 4172871.
- Cazzaniga, I. (1951a). "Osservazioni intorno ai frammenti fiorentini dell'Ippomedonte di Euforione". Miscellanea Giovanni Galbiati. Fontes Ambrosiani, 25. Vol. 1. Milan: Ulrico Hoepli. pp. 49–69.
- Cazzaniga, I. (1951b). "Parcae 'Domicilae' sorores". SCO. 1: 91–93. JSTOR 24172387.
- Cazzaniga, I. (1952). "Due codici ispanici del «De Lapsu Susannae». Contributo alla storia della tradizione manoscritta dell'omelia pseudoambrosiana". ASNP. 2nd Series. 21 (3–4): 245–252. JSTOR 24299505.
- Cazzaniga, I. (1953a). "A Callimaco, fr. 100, 4 Pfeiffer". SCO. 3: 9–13. JSTOR 24172393.
- Cazzaniga, I. (1953b). "A proposito d'una recensione alle mie edizioni critiche del «De Lapsu Susannae»". Acme. 6 (1): 155–171.
- Cazzaniga, I. (1953c). "Emendamento ad un passo della Vita di S. Emiliano di Braulione Cesaraugustano". Paideia. 8: 86–87.
- Cazzaniga, I. (1953d). "Il «Secreti secretorum pseudoaristotelici de physiognomonia caput» nella versione di Filippo Tripolitano, in un codice della Capitolare Monzese". Studi di paleografia, diplomatica, storia e araldica in onore di Cesare Manaresi. Milan: Antonino Giuffré. pp. 125–130.
- Cazzaniga, I. (1953e). "Il frammento tragico di Gige e la tradizione retorica". PP. 8: 381–398.
- Cazzaniga, I. (1953f). "Il Monacense 3787 (sec. X) del «De Lapsu Susannae»". AMV. New Series. 28: 125–129.
- Cazzaniga, I. (1953g). "Osservazioni intorno alla tradizione del glossario di Ansileubo". Acme. 6 (3): 315–347.
- Cazzaniga, I. (1953h). "Saggio critico ed esegetico sul Pervirgilium Veneris". SCO. 3: 47–101. JSTOR 24172395.
- Cazzaniga, I. (1953i). "Spigolature critiche dal glossario di Ansileubo". Paideia. 8: 193–195.
- Cazzaniga, I. (1953j). "Una moneta di Hybla ed il v. 45 del Pervigilium Veneris: Nec Ceres nec Bacchus absunt". SCO. 3: 134–140. JSTOR 24172400.
- Cazzaniga, I. (1954a). "Agni o tauri in Pervigilium Veneris v. 81?". RIL. 87: 271–282.
- Cazzaniga, I. (1954b). "Appunti intorno alla tradizione ms. della vita di S. Emiliano di Braulione Cesaraugustano ed alcune osservazioni di critica testuale (a proposito dell'edizione Madrilena del 1942)". Acme. 7 (3): 533–549.
- Cazzaniga, I. (1954c). "Colore retorico nell' episodio Ambrosiano della Cena di Erode (Ambros., De Virginibus, III, 5, 25 sgg.)". Latomus. 13 (4): 569–576. JSTOR 41517885.
- Cazzaniga, I. (1954d). "La Vita di S. Emiliano scritta da Braulione vescovo di Saragozza: edizione critica". BENC. Nuova Serie 3: 7–44.
- Cazzaniga, I. (1954e). "Tre spigolature critiche". ASNP. 2nd Series. 23 (1–2): 227–229. JSTOR 24299934.
- Cazzaniga, I. (1955a). "Dai papiri dell'Università Statale di Milano: frammento di grammatico". Acme. 8 (2): 67–71.
- Cazzaniga, I. (1955b). "Il verso 23 del Pervigilium Veneris (Deque Amoris Osculis) e alcune pitture vascolari". PP. 10: 188–195.
- Cazzaniga, I. (1956a). "Frammenti di encomia a Minosse, Radamanto e Tideo (Dai papiri inediti dell'Istituto di Papirologia della Università degli Studi di Milano)". SIFC. New Series. 29: 133–173.
- Cazzaniga, I. (1956b). "I codici Licofroniani e Nicandrei della Biblioteca Ambrosiana". Acme. 9 (2): 19–24.
- Cazzaniga, I. (1956c). "Il «Pervigilium Veneris»". Nuova Antologia. 468: 331–342.
- Cazzaniga, I. (1956d). "Intorno al Pap. Fiorentino inv. 516". Acme. 9 (2): 53–56.
- Cazzaniga, I. (1956e). "Osservazioni a Lucano l. XI 828-33. L'avventura di Murro col basilisco". Acme. 9 (1): 7–9.
- Cazzaniga, I. (1956f). "Spigolature critiche II. Osservazioni ad alcune iscrizioni greche di Tracia". SCO. 5: 107–110. JSTOR 24172464.
- Cazzaniga, I. (1956g). "Spigolature critiche III. Osservazioni ad alcuni passi di Cassiodoro-Epifanio". PP. 11: 110–115.
- Cazzaniga, I.; Vandoni, M. (1956). "Nuovo frammento di scholion a Nicandro, Theriaka vv. 526-29 (dai papiri inediti della Università Statale di Milano)". SIFC. New Series. 27–28: 85–101.
- Cazzaniga, I.; Fossati, S.; Carollo, A. (1956). "Collazione di alcuni manoscritti di omelie ambrosiane". Acme. 9 (3): 53–74. (Note: "I. I codici Parigini del De Virginitate di S. Ambrogio"; "II. Codice Bergamasco A. 3. 14 del De Virginitate di S. Ambrogio (sec. XII)"; "III. Il de Nativitate beatae Mariae Virginis di S. Ambrogio (= De Virginibus II, cc. 6–17) in un lezionario cassinese del sec. XI". Cazzaniga wrote pt. III (= pp. 73–74).)
- Cazzaniga, I.; Gianformaggio, A.; Ariatta, P. A. (1956). "Collazione di manoscritti Nicandrei". Acme. 9 (3): 37–51. (Note: "I. Nuova collazione del Gottingense Nicandreo"; "II. Nuova collazione del Vaticano Nicandreo"; "III. I Theriaka Nicandrei dell'Ambrosiano C 32 Sup. (sec. XV)". Cazzaniga wrote pt. III (pp. 49–51).)
- Cazzaniga, I. (1957a). "Frammenti di encomia a Minosse, Radamanto e Tideo (Dai papiri inediti dell'Istituto di Papirologia della Università Statale di Milano)". SIFC. Nuova Serie, 29: 133–173.
- Cazzaniga, I. (1957b). "Glosse inedite ai Theriaka ed Alexipharmaka di Nicandro (Cod. Ambrosiano C 32 Sup.)". SCO. 6: 5–61. JSTOR 24172404.
- Cazzaniga, I. (1957c). "L'episodio dei serpi libici in Lucano e la tradizione dei «Theriaka» Nicandrei". Acme. 10: 27–41.
- Cazzaniga, I. (1957d). "Nicandro, Theriaka 406". PP. 12: 130–131.
- Cazzaniga, I. (1957e). "Spigolature critiche IV. La novella metamorfica di Teofilo Zenodoteo (Phalanx ed Arachne) e lo scholion Nicandr. Ther. 1". PP. 12: 275–280.
- Cazzaniga, I. (1958a). "La tradizione poetica ellenistica nella favola ovidiana di Giacinto. Euforione, Bione, Nicandro, Schol. Nic. Th. 585". PP. 13: 149–156.
- Cazzaniga, I. (1958b). "Note marginali al Papiro Berlinese 13927 (V–VI secolo d.C.): un inventario degli oggetti necessari per rappresentazioni sceniche". SCO. 7: 7–19. JSTOR 24172437.
- Cazzaniga, I. (1959a). "Alcuni «colori» nicandrei in Stazio e Claudiano (Theb. V, 505; Gigant. II, 25)". Acme. 12: 125–129.
- Cazzaniga, I. (1959b). "Avventure egiziane di Lyrcos Argivo? Esegesi testuale di un passo di Partenio, Erot. Path. I. 3". PP. 14: 135–139.
- Cazzaniga, I. (1959c). "Intorno al verso 376 della Ciris: Amyclaeo spargens altaria thallo". PP. 14: 453–457.
- Cazzaniga, I. (1959d). "La Laodice Priamide di Trifiodoro e la tradizione di Euforione, Licofrone e Polignoto". PP. 14: 321–336.
- Cazzaniga, I. (1959e). "Spigolature critiche V. Partenio di Nicea IV. 4, VIII.1, I.1". PP. 14: 291–292.
- Cazzaniga, I. (1960a). "A proposito di una presunta ironia virgiliana (Georg. 1.388-38)". SIFC. Nuova Serie 32: 1–17. (Note: Reprinted in Gioseffi 2000, pp. 31–49 and Gioseffi 2000, pp. 51–72 respectively.)
- Cazzaniga, I. (1960b). "Colori nicandrei in Virgilio". SIFC. Nuova Serie 32: 18–37.
- Cazzaniga, I. (1960c). "Contributo per lo studio della tradizione manoscritta dell'«Elementarium Papiae»". SCO. 9: 74–75. JSTOR 24172484.
- Cazzaniga, I. (1960d). "Dell'elisione di δέ, ὑπό, ἀπό, κατά ecc. nella prosa di Antonino Liberale (Cod. Palatino)". Acme. 13 (2–3): 217–218.
- Cazzaniga, I. (1960e). "Il v. 17 della Ciris". PP. 15: 53–56.
- Cazzaniga, I. (1960f). "Glosse inedite ai Theriaka ed Alexipharmaka di Nicandro". SCO. 9: 5–6. JSTOR 24172481.
- Cazzaniga, I. (1960g). "Note marginali agli Epigrammi Bobbiesi". SIFC. Nuova Serie, 32: 145–155.
- Cazzaniga, I. (1960h). "Nuove osservazioni critiche al testo di Antonino Liberale". RIL. 94: 68–72.
- Cazzaniga, I. (1960i). "Osservazioni critiche al testo di Antonino Liberale (26, 1; 39, 3; 14, 2 e 3–4; 41, 9)". SCO. 9: 100–105. JSTOR 24172486.
- Cazzaniga, I. (1960j). "Osservazioni critiche intorno ad alcuni passi della «Ciris»". SIFC. Nuova Serie, 32: 125–145.
- Cazzaniga, I. (1960k). "Osservazioni critico-testuali ad alcuni passi nicandrei (Ther. 308; Alex. 64, 150, 278, 332, 565, 575)". Studi in onore di Luigi Castiglioni. Vol. 1. Firenze: G. C. Sansoni. pp. 179–198.
- Cazzaniga, I. (1960l). "Spigolature critiche VI. Antonino Liberale 23.2 (Battus)". PP. 15: 446–449.
- Cazzaniga, I. (1961a). "Appunti intorno ad alcuni aspetti della «positio debilis» nell'esametro dei poeti ellenistici: il monosillabo e il bisillabo". SCO. 10: 54–75. JSTOR 24172854.
- Cazzaniga, I. (1961b). "Catullo B 68, 50–60 e i vv. 1–7 del papiro Lond. di Partenio di Nicea". PP. 16: 124–126.
- Cazzaniga, I. (1961c). "I frammenti poetici di Partenio da Nicea: valutazioni critico-stilistiche". SCO. 10: 44–53. JSTOR 24172853.
- Cazzaniga, I. (1961d). "Note da alcuni passi di Vitruvio". PP. 16: 447–453.
- Cazzaniga, I. (1962a). "Grattio (Cyneg. 68) ed Ovidio (M. VIII 397)". PP. 17: 296–299.
- Cazzaniga, I. (1962b). "Spigolature critiche VI. Osservazioni critiche al testo di Partenio". PP. 17: 52–56. (Note: Erroneously titled "Spigolature critiche VI" by Cazzaniga.)
- Cazzaniga, I. (1962c). "Un epigramma di Fileta (fr. 10 Powell)". RFIC. New Series. 40: 238–248.
- Cazzaniga, I. (1963a). "Il deipnon adeipnon della Baucis ovidiana: ricerca di tecnica stilistica". PP. 18: 23–35.
- Cazzaniga, I. (1963b). "Intorno a λοιγός aggettivo in Nicandro". RFIC. 3rd Series. 91: 469–472.
- Cazzaniga, I. (1963c). "Nicandro, Theriaca v. 60". RFIC. 3rd Series. 91: 461–469.
- Cazzaniga, I. (1963d). "Osservazioni al testo ed alla tradizione manoscritta dei Theriaka nicandrei. I". SCO. 12: 84–92. JSTOR 24174753.
- Cazzaniga, I. (1963e). "Osservazioni intorno al poeta elegiaco del papiro della Sorbonne inv. 2254". CE. 38: 274–286.
- Cazzaniga, I. (1963f). "Spigolature critiche VII". PP. 18: 127–129. (Note: Epigr. Bobiensia 7 (Munari, p. 57) – Pap. Antin. I 4 (IV–V d.C.), r. 7–9 (Hermammon a Longino) – PSI 830 (IV-V d.C.), r. 7–9 (lettera di Antonio ad X) – PSI VII 825 (IV–V d.C.), r. 16–18 (Didimo a Severo).)
- Cazzaniga, I. (1963g). "Temi poetici alessandrini in Nonno Panopolitano: tradizione diretta ed indiretta". Miscellanea di Studi Alessandrini in memoria di Augusto Rostagni. Turin: Bottega d'Erasmo. pp. 626–646.
- Cazzaniga, I. (1964a). "Nota critica allo scholion a Nicandro Ther. 529: l'isola di Thapsos". Helikon. 4: 287–289.
- Cazzaniga, I. (1964b). "Note critico-testuali a due passi degli Scholia ai Theriaka nicandrei". Maia. New Series. 16: 389–394.
- Cazzaniga, I. (1964c). "Osservazioni critiche intorno ai P. Oxy. 46 e P. Oxy. 2221, 1, 26. I: Frammento di manuale di lotta del Il Sec. d.C.: P. Oxy. 406. II: Il frammentino menandreo di P. Oxy. 2221, 1, 26 (Hypomn. Nic. Ther. 382) e la interpretazione hypomnematica dei v. 377-83 Ther. (Glosse μάλκη e ξανᾶν)". Athenaeum. New Series. 42 (52): 373–398.
- Cazzaniga, I. (1964d). "Per il testo di Vibio Sequestre". RFIC. 3rd Series. 92: 180–192.
- Cazzaniga, I. (1964e). "Proskynema al dio Mandulis. Esegesi di un'iscrizione di Talmis". PP. 19: 69–72.
- Alfonsi, L.; Cazzaniga, I.; Della Corte, F.; Mariotti, S. (1964). "Domizio Marso". Maia. New Series. 16: 377–388.
- Cazzaniga, I. (1965a). "Kòrope, Órope, Oropìa, Oròpos (Schol. Ther. 614; Schol. Nic. ap. Steph. Byzant, s.v. Koρόπη)". Maia. New Series. 17: 60–68.
- Cazzaniga, I. (1965b). "Intorno da alcuni epiteti di Iside nella litania di P. Oxy. 1380". PP. 20: 233–236.
- Cazzaniga, I. (1965c). "Note critico-filologiche". SCO. 14: 13–19. JSTOR 24174787. (Note: I: Il Castellum Berecyntium di Vibio Sequestre e Servio. II: Il cuculo «araldo» di primavera: Nicandro, Ther. 380. III: Plinio li Vecchio XXX 25 e al tradizione di Schol. Nicandro, Ther. 372.)
- Cazzaniga, I. (1965d). "Osservazioni critiche a tre passi d'Ammiano Marcellino". PP. 20: 160–162.
- Cazzaniga, I.; Merkelbach, Reinhold (1965a). "Nochmals über das Proskynema an den Gott Mandulis". PP. 20: 301–302.
- Cazzaniga, I.; Merkelbach, Reinhold (1965b). "Osservazioni critico-testuali agli Inni Isiaci di Isidoro". PP. 20: 298–300.
- Cazzaniga, I. (1966a). ""Columnae exatonpentaicae» e «columnae tripolitae» nel «Liber Pontificalis"". SCO. 15: 278–280. JSTOR 24174779.
- Cazzaniga, I. (1966b). "A Nicandro, Theriaka 449: ἐϰ παλαχῆς ἐπαέξεται". SCO. 15: 281–283. JSTOR 24174780.
- Cazzaniga, I. (1966c). "Animadversiones in duos Artemidori locos". WS. 79: 230–236.
- Cazzaniga, I. (1966d). "De papyro 65445 apud Cairense Museum servata, v. 140–154". PP. 21: 487–493.
- Cazzaniga, I. (1966e). "Intorno ai lykospades in Nicandro". RFIC. 3rd Series. 94: 441–451.
- Cazzaniga, I. (1966f). "Nota critico-testuale a Scholion Nicandri Theriaca 102 e 662". RIL. 100: 276–278.
- Cazzaniga, I. (1966g). "Sui χρησμοί di Apolo da Hierapolis frigia". PP. 21: 67–73.
- Cazzaniga, I. (1966h). "Sul frammento di Livio Andronico nr. 03 Mor. (21 Mar.)". RFIC. 3rd Series. 94: 413–414.
- Cazzaniga, I. (1967a). "Ad Ennio, Andromeda fr. III v. 98 Kl". RFIC. 3rd Series. 95: 258–259.
- Cazzaniga, I. (1967b). "Bittis Coa". PP. 22: 294.
- Cazzaniga, I. (1967c). "Il frammento di Sulpicia, Orazio Ep. XI e Tertulliano Apol. 46, 10". RFIC. 3rd Series. 95: 295–300.
- Cazzaniga, I. (1967d). "Nota al testo di Plinio, N.H. XXXI 46". PP. 22: 366–367.
- Cazzaniga, I. (1967e). "Osservazioni a tre frammenti d'Antimaco e a Callimaco fr. 348 Pf". PP. 22: 363–366.
- Cazzaniga, I. (1967f). "Osservazioni critiche ad alcuni passi di Artemidoro". Maia. New Series. 19: 58–61.
- Cazzaniga, I. (1967g). "Papyrologica Mediolanensia – III: Osservazioni critiche intorno allo hypomnema antimacheo di Pap. Mil. Vogl. I 17, 33–36 (= fr. 182 Antimachi W.)". PP. 22: 63–74.
- Cazzaniga, I. (1967h). "Spigolature critiche dai glossari latini". PP. 22: 359–363.
- Cazzaniga, I. (1967i). "Una dedica del prefetto M. Rutilio Lupo? Un papiro dell'Univ. Statale di Milano, proveniente dagli scavi di Medinet Madi". Aegyptus. 47 (3–4): 213–216. JSTOR 41216162.
- Cazzaniga, I. (1968a). "Il dio e la cerva nella monetazione di Caulonia e la tradizione ecistica Cauloniate". PP. 23: 371–390.
- Cazzaniga, I. (1968b). "Osservazioni critiche al testo del «Prologo» del Vangelo di Nicodemo". RIL. 102: 535–548.
- Cazzaniga, I. (1968c). "Un τριακοντάκλινος in Niceta d'Amnia (Vita di S. Filareto) e P. Mil. Vogl. 24". SCO. 17: 535–548. JSTOR 24176085.
- Cazzaniga, I. (1968d). "Uno spunto dell'Hecale callimachea in un passo della Vita di S. Filareto di Niceta d'Amnia?". PP. 23: 224–227.
- Cazzaniga, I. (1969a). "Aulonia e Caulonia in Ecateo". PP. 24: 38–44.
- Cazzaniga, I. (1969b). "I versi 112–113 dell'epitafio di Bione". Studi linguistici in onore di Vittore Pisani. Vol. 1. Brescia: Paideia. pp. 221–229.
- Cazzaniga, I. (1969c). "Il dio e la cerva nella monetazione di Caulonia". RIN. 5th Series. 17 (21): 9–24. (Note: Identical to Cazzaniga 1968a.)
- Cazzaniga, I. (1969d). "La leggenda Fortuna Peduix in un aureo di Uranio Antonino". RIN. 5th Series. 17 (21): 67–71.
- Cazzaniga, I. (1970a). "Corippo ed Accio: la glossa «tela reciproca»". GIF. 2nd Series. 1.3 (22): 36–38.
- Cazzaniga, I. (1970b). "Critica testuale ed esegesi a Nosside A.P. VII 718". РР. 25: 431–445.
- Cazzaniga, I. (1970c). "L'Olympionikes Dikon da Cauloniate a Siracusano (Pausan. VI ,3 5)". Studia Florentina Alexandro Ronconi sexagenario oblata. Roma: Edizioni dell'Ateneo. pp. 77–80.
- Cazzaniga, I. (1970d). "Osservazioni storico-linguistiche intorno allo statere d'argento incuso di Siri e Pixunte". RIN. 5th Series. 18 (72): 9–17.
- Cazzaniga, I. (1970d). "Un'osservazione al testo della lettera di Capitolino a Sarapammone (P. Oxy. 2728, sec. III–IV d.C.)". Acme. 23 (1–2): 67–70.
- Cazzaniga, I. (1970–1971). "Due contributi filologici". SCO. 19–20: 5–14. JSTOR 24178759.
- Cazzaniga, I. (1971a). "Del nuovo Ennio nella Ioannide di Corippo?". RFIC. 3rd Series. 99: 276–287.
- Cazzaniga, I. (1971b). "In Ennii Andromedam adnotationes tres". Studi di storiografia antica in memoria di Leonardo Ferrero. Turin: Bottega d'Erasmo. pp. 49–52.
- Cazzaniga, I. (1971c). "L'estensione alla Sicilia dell'espressione Magna Grecia in Strabone (VI 1, 2)". PP. 26: 26–31.
- Cazzaniga, I. (1971d). "Le metafore enniane relative a cielo e stelle ed alcuni placita di tradizione anassimeno-empedoclea". PP. 26: 102–119.
- Cazzaniga, I. (1971e). "Τέρινα μεγάλη Ἑλλάς". PP. 26: 31–34.
- Cazzaniga, I. (1971f). "Un'osservazione testuale ad Accio Ex inc. fab. fr. XXII Kl". RFIC. 3rd Series. 99: 58–59.
- Cazzaniga, I. (1972a). "Animadversiones Criticae in Cresconii Corippi lohannida". RFIC. 3rd Series. 100: 46–67.
- Cazzaniga, I. (1972b). "Gli epigrammi contro Diadumeniano e Macrino (H.A.) e la tradizione epigrammatica". PP. 27: 137–155.
- Cazzaniga, I. (1972c). "L'inno di Nicandro ad Attalo I (fr. 104): esegesi e problematica". PP. 27: 369–396.
- Cazzaniga, I. (1972d). "Lucano IX. 768 (e 814) e Stazio, Theb. 5.597-98: critica testuale". Acme. 25: 225–228.
- Cazzaniga, I. (1972e). "Lucus a non lucendo". SCO. 21: 27–29. JSTOR 24181153.
- Cazzaniga, I. (1972f). "Nosside, nome aristocratico per la poetessa di Locri?". ASNP. 3rd Series. 2 (1): 173–176. JSTOR 24301573.
- Cazzaniga, I. (1972g). "Osservazioni critiche a un frammento della 'Europía' di Nicandro". SCO. 21: 23–26. JSTOR 24181152.
- Cazzaniga, I. (1972h). "Psogos ed epainos di Zenobia. Colori retorici in Vopisco e Pollione (H.A.)". PP. 27: 156–82.
- Cazzaniga, I. (1972i). "Un'ipotesi sul significato dell'emblema del granchio nella monetazione di Akragas Sicula". NAC. 1: 27–31.
- Cazzaniga, I. (1972j). "Un motto di spirito augurale per l'impero di Regiliano". GIF. 2nd Series. 3 (24): 341–345.
- Cazzaniga, I. (1972k). "Μελεαγρίδες καὶ τὰ τῶν Λερίων παραλειπόμενα. Scherzo poetico pseudo-ellenistico". A&R. New Series. 17: 25–28.
- Cazzaniga, I. (1973a). "Gli Aetolika di Nicandro: esegesi dei frammenti". ASNP. 3rd Series. 3 (2): 357–380. JSTOR 24300631.
- Cazzaniga, I. (1973b). "Observationes criticae in Nicandri Theriaka". SCO. 22: 50–84. JSTOR 24180677.
- Cazzaniga, I. (1973c). "Esegesi critica dei framm. 10, 20, 20a, dei Theriaka e dei framm. 16 e 18 degli Oetaika Nicandrei". GB. 1: 79–88.
- Cazzaniga, I. (1973d). "Il frammento 17 (Schneider) degli Οἰταικά di Nicandro: κύαθος". Paideia. 28: 47–50.
- Cazzaniga, I. (1973e). "Nicandri fragmentum 85 Georgikon: De brassicis". RIL. 107: 3–9.
- Cazzaniga, I. (1973f). "Il Mesotribes di Bleso, e Stratone". RFIC. 3rd Series. 101: 451.
- Cazzaniga, I. (1973g). "Eco di riti e culti orientali nella torture di alcuni martiri giulianei di Siria e i frammenti papiracei testé editi del romanzo «Phoenikika» di Lollianos". VCHR. 10: 305–318.
- Cazzaniga, I. (1973h). "Pap. Zenon. 59532: epigramma in distici per la morte del cane Tauron". Eirene. 11: 71–89.
- Cazzaniga, I. (1973i). "Il χρησμός XVI di Apollo Kareios a Hierapolis frigia 'La tartaruga più veloce del corvo e degli uccelli'". PP. 28: 215–219.
- Cazzaniga, I. (1973j). "Una nuova citazione del v. 187 Jocelyn delle tragedie di Ennio". PP. 28: 277.
- Cazzaniga, I. (1973–1974). "'Glaucippe' o 'Alcippe', la 'dama dall'elefante'?". ArchClass. 25 (6): 53–57. JSTOR 44366155.
- Cazzaniga, I. (1974a). "Gorgos di Claros e la sua attività letteraria". PP. 29: 145–152.
- Cazzaniga, I. (1974b). "De Atalantae tabula Parrhasiana". ANSP. 3rd Series. 4 (4): 1301–1306. JSTOR 24301161.
- Cazzaniga, I. (1974c). "Il frammento 61 degli Annali di Ennio: Quirinus Indiges". PP. 29: 362–381.
- Cazzaniga, I. (1974d). "Apicio o Sulpicia? (H.A., Spart. Ael. 5, 9)". SIFC. New Series. 46: 252–255.
- Cazzaniga, I. (1974e). "Il tetrapharmacum cibo adrianeo (H.A., Spart., Vit. Hadr. 21, 4, Vit. Ael. 5, 4 e Philod., P. Herc. 1005, IV, 10): esegesi e critica testuale". Poesia latina in frammenti. Miscellanea filologica (Studi in onore di Francesco Della Corte). Genova: Università di Genova, Facoltà di lettere, Istituto di filologia classica e medievale. pp. 359–366.
- Cazzaniga, I. (1974f). "Note critico-testuali ad alcuni passi del nuovo testo di Asterio Ad Renatum monachum". RFIC. 3rd Series. 102: 432–439.
- Cazzaniga, I. (1975a). "Per Nicandro Colofonio la Titanomachia fu opera autentica di Esiodo?". RIL. 109: 173–180.
- Cazzaniga, I. (1975b). "Nicandri fragmentum de floribus (Ge. 74 G.-S.) latine conversum". A&R. New Series. 20: 72–76.
- Cazzaniga, I.; De Angelis, V. (1975). "Alcune glosse latine". SCO. 24: 169–178. JSTOR 24180512. (Note: Cazzaniga wrote pp. 174–178.)
- Cazzaniga, I. (1976). "Note nicandree". SCO. 25: 317–324. JSTOR 24180532.
- Cazzaniga, I. (1978a). "In Pindari fragm. 94B Snell (P. Oxy. 659, II 18–20)". PP. 33: 292–293.
- Cazzaniga, I. (1978b). "Pindaro μέλι γλάζεις. La melodia panica". PP. 33: 338–346.
- Cazzaniga, I. (1979). "Osservazioni critico-testuali ad alcuni passi delle Georgiche nicandree". ANSP. 3rd Series. 9 (1): 59–77. JSTOR 24303176.

== Bibliography ==
- Bastianini, G. (2001). "L'Istituto di Papirologia dell'Università Statale di Milano". In Andorlini, I.; Bastianini, G.; Manfredi, M.; Menci, G. (eds.). Atti del XXII Congresso Internazionale di Papirologia (Firenze, 23–29 agosto 1998). Vol. I. Firenze: Istituto Papirologico "G. Vitelli". pp. 105–109.
- Claudius Aelianus (1973). Leone, P. Al. [= L.] M. (ed.). Epistulae Rusticae. Testi e documenti per lo studio dell'antichità, 43. Milano – Varese: Istituto Editoriale Cisalpino – La Goliardica.
- Foraboschi, D., ed. (1971). L'Archivio di Kronion. Testi e documenti per lo studio dell'antichità, 36. Milan: Istituto Editoriale Cisalpino – La Goliardica.
- Foraboschi, D., ed. (1981). La contabilità di un'azienda agricola nel II sec. d.C. P. Mil. Vogliano, VII. Milan: Istituto Editoriale Cisalpino – La Goliardica.
- Gallazzi, Cl. (2007). "Sessant'anni di papirologia all'Accademia scientifico-letteraria e all'Università degli Studi: ricerche, pubblicazioni e scavi dal 1914 al 1977" (PDF). Annali di Storia delle Università Italiane. 11: 166–178 – via unibo.
- Geymonat, M. (1993). "Ignazio Cazzaniga". Eikasmos. 4: 151–153 – via unibo.
- Gigante, M. (1976). "I papiri ercolanesi nella ricerca papirologica italiana". Studia papyrologica. 15: 25–37.
- Gioseffi, M. (1993). "Bibliografia di Ignazio Cazzaniga (1911–1974)". Acme. 46 (1): 5–23.
- Gioseffi, M., ed. (2000). E io sarò tua guida. Raccolta di saggi su Virgilio e gli studi virgiliani. Milan: LED. ISBN 88-7916-137-7.
- Grilli, A. (1974). "Ignazio Cazzaniga. Commemorazione". Rendiconti dell'Istituto Lombardo. Parte Generale. 108: 96–101.
- Grilli, A. (1975). "Ricordo di Ignazio Cazzaniga". Maia. New Series. 27: 314–317.
- Grilli, A.; Gualandri, I. (1977). "Premessa". Scripta philologa. Vol. I. Milano – Varese: Istituto Editoriale Cisalpino – La Goliardica. p. 7.
- Gualandri, I. (2023). "Per Ignazio Cazzaniga, in ricordo". ACME. 76 (1–2): 37–46. doi:10.54103/2282-0035/23023.
- Lehnus, L. (2014). "La dedica di Ignazio Cazzaniga. Ricordo". Atene e Roma. New Series II. 8 (1–2): 64–65. doi:10.1400/236646.
- Martinelli Tempesta, S. (2009). "Alberto Grilli professore e maestro". Acme. 62 (1): 57–72. hdl:2434/55591 – via unimi.
- Orlandi, T., ed. (1974). Lettere di San Paolo in Copto-ossirinchita. P. Mil. Vogliano, V (P. Mil. Copti). Milano – Varese: Istituto Editoriale Cisalpino – La Goliardica.
- Renna, E. (2014). "Le «Meleagridi» di Ignazio Cazzaniga". Atene e Roma. New Series II. 8 (1–2): 50–63. doi:10.1400/236645.
- Scripta philologa. Vol. I. Milano – Varese: Istituto Editoriale Cisalpino – La Goliardica. 1977.
- Scripta philologa. Vol. II. Milano – Varese: Istituto Editoriale Cisalpino – La Goliardica. 1980.
- Scripta philologa. Vol. III. Milano – Varese: Istituto Editoriale Cisalpino – La Goliardica. 1982.
