= Paolo Chiesa =

Italian medievalist and philologist (born 1956)

Paolo Chiesa (born 1956) is an Italian medievalist and philologist.

== Career ==
Chiesa graduated from the University of Milan in 1980, tutored by Giovanni Orlandi, and received a doctorate in Medieval Latin Studies from the University of Florence in 1987. In 1992 he was appointed associate professor at the University of Udine, and was promoted to Full professorship in 2000. In 2006, he moved back to Milan.

As of 2025, he is founding member of the Accademia Ambrosiana (Class of Greek and Latin Studies) and full member of the Istituto Lombardo, as well as a correspondent of the Monumenta Germaniae Historica (since 2014) and of the Accademia dei Lincei (since 2024), and a member of several scientific boards, including SISMEL and the Istituto Storico Italiano per il Medioevo. He is the editor of the scientific journal Filologia mediolatina, published by SISMEL and the Fondazione Ezio Franceschini.

== Research activity ==
Chiesa specialized in Latin texts of the Middle Ages and on theory of textual criticism and stemmatic. He identified an autograph manuscript of the diplomat Liutprand of Cremona and published the critical edition of his works for the Corpus Christianorum. In 2009 he re-edited Liutpand's Antapodosis with facing Italian translation for the Collezione Lorenzo Valla; for the same series, he edited the description of Milan by Bonvesin da la Riva and the Itinerarium by William of Rubruck and translated the Ecclesiastical History of the English People by Bede (based on the critical text established by Michael Lapidge). He also translated Liutprand's pamphlet on Pope John XII and the Life of Charlemagne by Einhard. With Lucia Castaldi, he edited five volumes on the textual transmission of Medieval Latin texts. He also worked on Medieval translations from Greek to Latin and published a Medieval dossier about St Amphilochius of Iconium, attributing it to Anastasius Bibliothecarius.

In 2013, he edited and translated the Monarchia by Dante and in 2022 he co-edited a volume on Dante's Latin. Chiesa also studied the Regula Pastoralis by Pope Gregory the Great and argued that a Medieval manuscript of this work, now held in Troyes, might have been produced under Gregory's own supervision. In 2024, he published the first edition of Galvano Fiamma's Cronica universalis, containing the earliest known mention of the American continent in European literature (ca. two hundred and fifty years before Columbus).

Chiesa wrote an introduction to textual criticism, a casebook of philology of Latin texts of the Middle Ages, a survey of Latin literature of the Middle Ages and a handbook on textual transmission of Latin texts. In 2008 he co-edited Giovanni Orlandi's scripta minora and in 2017 a Gedenkschrift in the tenth anniversary of Orlandi's passing.

== Bibliography ==
=== Text editions ===
- Chiesa, Paolo (1987). "Una traduzione inedita di Anastasio Bibliotecario? Le "vitae" latine di sant'Anfilochio". Studi Medievali. 28: 879–903.
- Chiesa, Paolo (1989). "La traduzione latina del Sermo in reditu reliquiarum sancti Iohannis Chrysostomi di Cosma il Vestitore eseguita da Guarimpoto Grammatico". Aevum. 63 (2): 147–171. JSTOR 20858405.
- Chiesa, Paolo; Dolbeau, François (1989). "Una traduzione amalfitana dell'XI secolo: la Vita latina di sant'Epifanio". Studi Medievali. 30: 909–951.
- Chiesa, Paolo (1991). "Il dossier agiografico latino dei santi Gurias, Samonas e Abibos". Aevum. 65 (2): 221–258. JSTOR 20858630.
- Chiesa, Paolo (1994). "L'Historia Theophili Atheniensis: il più antico rifacimento latino della Poenitentia Theophili". Aevum. 68 (2): 259–281. JSTOR 20860390.
- Liudprandus Cremonensis (1998). Chiesa, Paolo (ed.). Antapodosis. Homelia paschalis. Historia Ottonis. Relatio de legatione Constantinopolitana. Corpus Christianorum — Continuatio Mediaevalis, 156. Turnhout: Brepols. ISBN 978-2-503-04561-0.
- Beda il Venerabile (2008). Lapidge, Michael (ed.). Storia degli Inglesi. Vol. I: Libri I–II. Translated by Chiesa, Paolo. Milan – Rome: Mondadori – Lorenzo Valla. ISBN 978-8-804-57393-7.
- Liutprando (2009). Chiesa, Paolo (ed.). Antapodosis. Milan – Rome: Mondadori – Lorenzo Valla. ISBN 978-8-804-52190-7.
- Beda il Venerabile (2010). Lapidge, Michael (ed.). Storia degli Inglesi. Vol. II: Libri III–V. Translated by Chiesa, Paolo. Milan – Rome: Mondadori – Lorenzo Valla. ISBN 978-8-804-59418-5.
- Bonvesin da la Riva (2013). Chiesa, Paolo (ed.). Le meraviglie di Milano. Milan – Rome: Mondadori – Lorenzo Valla. ISBN 978-8-804-58345-5.
- Dante Alighieri (2013). Chiesa, Paolo; Tabarroni, Andrea; Ellero, Diego (eds.). Le opere. Vol. IV: Monarchia. Rome: Salerno Editrice. ISBN 978-88-84-02853-2.
- Guglielmo di Rubruck (2014). Chiesa, Paolo (ed.). Viaggio in Mongolia. Milan – Rome: Mondadori – Lorenzo Valla. ISBN 978-8-804-60425-9.
- Eginardo (2014). Chiesa, Paolo (ed.). Vita Karoli. "Personalità e imprese di un re grandissimo e di meritatissima fama". Per Verba – Testi mediolatini con traduzione, 29. Florence: SISMEL – Edizioni del Galluzzo. ISBN 978-88-8450-537-8.
- Liutprando (2018). Chiesa, Paolo (ed.). De Iohanne papa et Ottone imperatore. Crimini, deposizione e morte di un pontefice maledetto. Per Verba – Testi mediolatini con traduzione, 33. Florence: SISMEL – Edizioni del Galluzzo. ISBN 978-88-8450-841-6.
- Chiesa, Paolo (2022). "Inventio et miracula sancti Alexandri I papae – Inventio et miracula sancti Nazarii Iustinopolitani" (PDF). In Guglielmetti, Rossana E. (ed.). Anecdota Hagiographica e Codicibus Collecta. E codicibus library, 1. Firenze: SISMEL — Edizioni del Galluzzo. pp. 211–232. doi:10.36167/FC23PDF. ISBN 978-88-9290-177-3.
- Chiesa, Paolo; Bossi, Chiara (2022). "Passio sancti Iohannis martyris (BHL 4333)" (PDF). In Guglielmetti, Rossana E. (ed.). Anecdota Hagiographica e Codicibus Collecta. E codicibus library, 1. Firenze: SISMEL — Edizioni del Galluzzo. pp. 95–124. doi:10.36167/FC23PDF. ISBN 978-88-9290-177-3.
- Galvano Fiamma (2024). Chiesa, Paolo; Favero, Federica (eds.). Cronica universalis. E codicibus library, 3. Florence: SISMEL – Edizioni del Galluzzo. doi:10.36167/ECOD03PDF. ISBN 978-88-9290-377-7.

=== Monographs and edited volumes ===
- Chiesa, Paolo (1994). Liutprando di Cremona e il codice di Frisinga CLM 6388. Corpus Christianorum — Autographa Medii Aevi, 1. Turnhout: Brepols. ISBN 978-2-503-50391-2.
- Chiesa, Paolo, ed. (2001). Le cronache medievali di Milano. Scienze storiche, 73. Milan: Vita & Pensiero. ISBN 88-343-0667-8.
- Chiesa, Paolo; Castaldi, Lucia, eds. (2004). La trasmissione dei testi latini del Medioevo (Te.Tra.). Millennio Medievale, 50 • Strumenti e studi, 8. Vol. I. Florence: SISMEL – Edizioni del Galluzzo. ISBN 88-8450-111-3.
- Chiesa, Paolo; Castaldi, Lucia, eds. (2005). La trasmissione dei testi latini del Medioevo (Te.Tra.). Millennio Medievale, 57 • Strumenti e studi, 10. Vol. II. Florence: SISMEL – Edizioni del Galluzzo. ISBN 88-8450-164-4.
- Chiesa, Paolo, ed. (2006). I "Dialogi" di Gregorio Magno. Tradizione del testo e antiche traduzioni. Archivum Gregorianum, 10. Florence: SISMEL – Edizioni del Galluzzo. ISBN 978-88-8450-211-7.
- Orlandi, Giovanni (2008). Chiesa, Paolo; Fagnoni, Anna Maria; Guglielmetti, Rossana E.; Maggioni, Giovanni Paolo (eds.). Scritti di filologia mediolatina. Millennio Medievale, 77 • Strumenti e studi, 19. Florence: SISMEL – Edizioni del Galluzzo. ISBN 978-88-8450-284-1.
- Chiesa, Paolo; Castaldi, Lucia, eds. (2008). La trasmissione dei testi latini del Medioevo (Te.Tra.). Millennio Medievale, 75 • Strumenti e studi, 18. Vol. III. Florence: SISMEL – Edizioni del Galluzzo. ISBN 978-88-8450-285-8.
- Chiesa, Paolo (2012) [2002 (1st ed.)]. Elementi di critica testuale (2nd ed.). Bologna: Pátron. ISBN 978-88-5553-173-3.
- Chiesa, Paolo; Castaldi, Lucia, eds. (2012). La trasmissione dei testi latini del Medioevo (Te.Tra.). Millennio Medievale, 94 • Strumenti e studi, 32. Vol. IV. Florence: SISMEL – Edizioni del Galluzzo. ISBN 978-88-8450-466-1.
- Chiesa, Paolo; Castaldi, Lucia, eds. (2013). La trasmissione dei testi latini del Medioevo (Te.Tra.). Millennio Medievale, 98 • Strumenti e studi, 35. Vol. V. Florence: SISMEL – Edizioni del Galluzzo. ISBN 978-88-8450-480-7.
- Chiesa, Paolo (2016). Venticinque lezioni di filologia mediolatina. Galluzzo paperbacks, 3. Florence: SISMEL – Edizioni del Galluzzo. ISBN 978-88-8450-717-4.
  - Chiesa, Paolo (2019). Medieval Latin Philology. An Overview through Case-Studies. Galluzzo paperbacks, 3*. Florence: SISMEL – Edizioni del Galluzzo. ISBN 978-88-8450-908-6.
  - Chiesa, Paolo (2019). Medieval Latin Philology. An Overview through Case-Studies. Galluzzo paperbacks, 3*. Florence: SISMEL – Edizioni del Galluzzo. ISBN 978-88-8450-907-9.
- Chiesa, Paolo (2017). La letteratura latina del Medioevo. Un profilo storico. Rome: Carocci. ISBN 978-88-43-08888-1.
- Chiesa, Paolo; Fagnoni, Anna Maria; Guglielmetti, Rossana E., eds. (2017). Ingenio facilis. Per Giovanni Orlandi (1936–2007). Millennio Medievale, 111 • Strumenti e studi, 43. Florence: SISMEL – Edizioni del Galluzzo. ISBN 978-88-8450-800-3.
- Chiesa, Paolo (2019). La trasmissione dei testi latini. Storia e metodo critico. Rome: Carocci. ISBN 978-88-43-09445-5.
- Chiesa, Paolo; Farmhouse Alberto, Paulo; Goullet, Monique, eds. (2020). Understanding Hagiography. Studies in the Textual Transmission of Early Medieval Saints' Lives. Quaderni di «Hagiographica», 17. Florence: SISMEL – Edizioni del Galluzzo. ISBN 978-88-8450-960-4.
- Chiesa, Paolo; Favero, Federica, eds. (2022). Il latino di Dante. mediEVI, 35. Florence: SISMEL – Edizioni del Galluzzo. ISBN 978-88-9290-178-0.
- Chiesa, Paolo (2024). La trasmissione dei testi latini. Storia e metodo critico (2nd ed.). Rome: Carocci. ISBN 978-8-829-02242-7.
