= Ebbe Vilborg =

Swedish philologist (1926–2018)

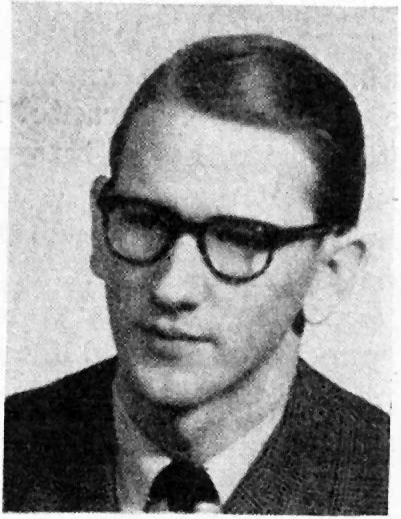
- Ebbe Vilborg in 1956
- Born: Karl Ebbe Vilborg; 14 February 1926; Annedal, Gothenburg, Sweden
- Died: 30 December 2018 (aged 92)
- Awards: Honorary Member of the World Esperanto Association (2001–); OSIEK award (1992)

Academic background
- Thesis: Sammanfattning av en ny textversion av den hellenske romanförfattaren Akilo Tacius ^{α} (1955)

Ebbe Vilborg (1926–2018) was a Swedish philologist of classical languages, Esperantist, lexicographer, terminologist and interlinguist and esperantologist.

== Early life and education ==
Karl Ebbe Vilborg was born on 14 February 1926 in Annedal, Gothenburg, to Annie Carolina Cederberg and Karl Viktor Vilborg.

In 1955, Vilborg obtained his PhD.

== Career ==
Vilborg was an associate professor of Greek at the University of Gothenburg. In 2001, Vilborg was made an honorary member of Universal Esperanto Association.

== Publications ==
- Vilborg, Ebbe (1960). A Tentative Grammar of Mycenaean Greek. Studia Graeca et Latina Gothoburgensia. Gothenburg: Almqvist & Wiksell. ^{[β]}
- Vilborg, Ebbe (1962). Achilles Tatius: Leucippe and Clitophon : a commentary. Studia Graeca et Latina Gothoburgensia. Stockholm: Almqvist & Wiksell.
- Vilborg, Ebbe (2001). Norstedts svensk-latinska ordbok [27.000 ord och fraser] (in Swedish and Latin) (1 ed.). Stockholm: Norstedts ordbok. ISBN 9172272198.

=== Esperanto ===
- Vilborg, Ebbe (1958). Lilla Esperanto ordboken : I. Svenska Esperanto. II. Esperanto-Svenska [Little Esperanto dictionary: I. Swedish Esperanto. II. Esperanto-Swedish] (in Swedish and Esperanto). Malmö: Förlagsföreningen Esperanto.
- Vilborg, Ebbe (1975). Supplement till svensk-Esperantisk ordbok. Malmö: Förlagsföreningen Esperanto. ISBN 9185288012.
- Vilborg, Ebbe (1989). Etimologia vortaro de Esperanto : 1 : A - D. Malmö: Eldona Societo Esperanto. ISBN 9185288179.
- Vilborg, Ebbe (1991). Etimologia vortaro de Esperanto : 2 : E - Ĵ. Malmö: Eldona Societo Esperanto. ISBN 9185288195.
- Vilborg, Ebbe (1992). Ordbok svenska-Esperanto (1 ed.). Malmö: Esperantoförlaget. ISBN 9185288209.
- Andréasson, Märtha; Jalming, Ralf; Vilborg, Ebbe (1994). Esperanto-rörelsen in Gothenburg 1892 - 1992. Gothenburg: Esperanto-Alliansen i Gothenburg. ISBN 9163032635.
- Vilborg, Ebbe (1995). Etimologia vortaro de Esperanto : 4 : N - R. Malmö: Eldona Societo Esperanto. ISBN 9185288225.
- Vilborg, Ebbe (2001). Etimologia vortaro de Esperanto : 3 : K - M. Malmö: Eldona Societo Esperanto. ISBN 9185288233.
- Vilborg, Ebbe (2001). Etimologia vortaro de Esperanto : 5 : S - Z. Malmö: Eldona Societo Esperanto. ISBN 9185288233.

== Notes ==
^α Esperanto: Konstituo de nova tekstversio de la Helena romanverkisto Akilo Tacio
^β Also published as "A Tentative Grammar of Mycenaean Greek". Göteborgs universitets årsskrift. 60 (2). Gothenburg. 1960.
