= List of ancient Greek playwrights =

This is a list of notable playwrights from Greek antiquity.

== Tragedies ==
- Thespis (c. 6th century BC):
- Aeschylus (c. 525–456 BC):
  - The Persians (472 BC)
  - Seven Against Thebes (467 BC)
  - The Suppliants (463 BC)
  - The Oresteia (458 BC, a trilogy comprising Agamemnon, The Libation Bearers and The Eumenides.)
  - Prometheus Bound (authorship and date of performance is still in dispute)
- Phrynichus (~511 BC):
  - The Fall of Miletus (c. 511 BC)
  - Phoenissae (c. 476 BC)
  - Danaides
  - Actaeon
  - Huzaifus
  - Alcestis
  - Tantalus
- Achaeus of Eretria (484-c. 405 BC)
  - Adrastus
  - Linus
  - Cycnus
  - Eumenides
  - Philoctetes
  - Pirithous
  - Theseus
  - Œdipus
- Achaeus of Syracuse (c. 356 BC)
- Agathon (c. 448–400 BC)
  - Aerope
  - Alcmeon
  - Anthos or Antheus ("The Flower")
  - Mysoi ("Mysians")
  - Telephos ("Telephus")
  - Thyestes
- Aphareus (4th century BC)
  - Asklepios**
  - Akhilleus**
  - Tantalos**
- Sophocles (c. 495–406 BC):
  - Theban plays, or Oedipus cycle:
    - Antigone (c. 442 BC)
    - Oedipus Rex (c. 429 BC)
    - Oedipus at Colonus (401 BC, posthumous)
  - Ajax (unknown, presumed earlier in career)
  - The Trachiniae (unknown)
  - Electra (unknown, presumed later in career)
  - Philoctetes (409 BC)
- Euripides (c. 480–406 BC):
  - Alcestis (438 BC)
  - Medea (431 BC)
  - The Heracleidae (Herakles Children) (c. 429 BC)
  - Hippolytus (428 BC)
  - Electra (c. 420 BC)
  - Sisyphos (415 BC)
  - Andromache (428–24 BC)
  - The Suppliants (422 BC)
  - Hecuba (424 BC)
  - Herakles (421–416 BC)
  - The Trojan Women (Troades) (415 BC)
  - Ion (414–412 BC)
  - Iphigenia in Tauris (414–412 BC)
  - Helen (412 BC)
  - The Phoenician Women (The Phoinissae) (411–409 BC)
  - Iphigenia At Aulis (Iphigenia ad Aulis) (410 BC)
  - Orestes (408 BC)
  - The Cyclops (c. 408 BC)
  - The Bacchae (405 BC, posthumous)
  - Rhesus (unknown)
- Euphorion (5th century BC); possibly the author of Prometheus Bound, which is often attributed to his father Aeschylus
- Phaesus (411–321 BC)
- Philocles (c.5th century BC)
- Ezekiel the Tragedian (3rd century BC)
  - Exagōgē

== Comedies ==
- Susarion of Megara (~580 BC)
- Epicharmus of Kos (~540–450 BC)
- Phormis, late 6th century BC
- Dinolochus, 487 BC
- Euetes 485 BC
- Euxenides 485 BC
- Mylus 485 BC
- Chionides 487 BC
- Magnes 472 BC
- Cratinus (~520–420 BC)
- Crates c. 450 BC
- Ecphantides
- Pisander
- Epilycus
- Callias Schoenion
- Hermippus 435 BC
- Myrtilus
- Lysimachus
- Hegemon of Thasos, 413 BC
- Sophron
- Phrynichus
- Lycis, before 405 BC
- Lucrideus (c. 206 BC)
- Leucon
- Lysippus
- Eupolis (~446–411 BC)
- Aristophanes (c. 446–388 BC), a leading source for Greek Old Comedy:
  - The Acharnians (425 BC)
  - The Knights (424 BC)
  - The Clouds (423 BC)
  - The Wasps (422 BC)
  - Peace (421 BC)
  - The Birds (414 BC)
  - Lysistrata (411 BC)
  - Thesmophoriazusae (c. 411 BC)
  - The Frogs (405 BC)
  - Assemblywomen (c. 392 BC)
  - Plutus (388 BC)
- Pherecrates 420 BC
- Diocles of Phlius
- Sannyrion
- Philyllius, 394 BC
- Hipparchus
- Archippus
- Polyzelus
- Philonides
- Eunicus 5th century BC
- Telecleides 5th century BC
- Euphonius 458 BC
- Phrynichus (~429 BC)
- Cantharus 422 BC
- Ameipsias (c. 420 BC)
- Strattis (~412–390 BC)
- Cephisodorus 402 BC
- Plato (comic poet) late 5th century BC
- Theopompus c. 410 – c.380 BC
- Nicophon 5th century BC
- Nicochares (d.~345 BC)
- Eubulus early 4th century BC
- Araros, son of Aristophanes 388, 375
- Antiphanes (~408–334 BC)
- Anaxandrides 4th century BC
- Calliades 4th century BC
- Nicostratus
- Phillipus
- Philetarus c. 390-c. 320 BC
- Anaxilas 343 BC
- Ophelion
- Callicrates
- Heraclides, 348 BC
- Alexis (~375 – 275 BC)
- Amphis mid-4th century BC
- Axionicus
- Cratinus Junior
- Eriphus
- Epicrates of Ambracia 4th century BC
- Stephanus, 332 BC
- Strato
- Aristophon
- Euphron
- Sotades of Athens
- Augeas
- Epippus
- Heniochus
- Epigenes
- Mnesimachus
- Timotheus
- Sophilus
- Antidotus
- Naucrates
- Xenarchus
- Dromo
- Crobylus
- Philippides
- Philemon of Soli or Syracuse (~362–262 BC)
- Menander (c. 342–291 BC), a leading source for Greek New Comedy
  - Dyskolos (317 BC)
  - Samia (309 BC)
- Apollodorus of Carystus (~300–260 BC)
- Diphilus of Sinope (~340–290 BC)
- Dionysius
- Timocles 324 BC
- Theophilus
- Sosippus
- Anaxippus, 303 BC
- Demetrius, 299 BC
- Archedicus, 302 BC
- Sopater, 282 BC
- Damoxenus c. 370 BC – 270 BC
- Hegesippus, or Crobylus
- Theognetus
- Bathon
- Diodorus
- Machon of Corinth/Alexandria 3rd century BC
- Poseidippus of Cassandreia (~316–250 BC)
- Epinicus (~217 BC)
- Laines or Laenes 185 BC
- Philemon 183 BC
- Chairion or Chaerion 154 BC

== See also ==
- List of extant ancient Greek and Roman plays
- List of playwrights by nationality and date of birth
- Lists of authors
