= Pherecrates =

5th-century BC Athenian Old Comedy poet

Pherecrates (Greek: Φερεκράτης) was a Greek poet of Athenian Old Comedy, and a rough contemporary of Cratinus, Crates and Aristophanes.

He was victorious at least once at the City Dionysia, first probably in the mid-440s (IG II2 2325. 56; the fourth entry after Teleclides and three poets whose names have been lost, and just before Hermippus), and twice at the Lenaia, first probably in the mid- to late 430s (IG II2 2325. 122; just after Cratinus and just before Hermippus). He was especially famous for his inventive imagination, and the elegance and purity of his diction are attested by the epithet Ἀττικώτατος (most Attic) applied to him by Athenaeus and the sophist Phrynichus. He was the inventor of a new meter, called after him, the Pherecratean, which frequently occurs in the choruses of Greek tragedies and in Horace. According to an anonymous essay on tragedy, Pherecrates wrote 18 plays, suggesting that one or more of the 19 surviving titles must be eliminated somehow (i.e. by assigning the play to another author who wrote a comedy by the same name, and assuming an ancient scholarly error, or by identifying e.g. The Human Heracles and The Fake Heracles as a single play with multiple titles).

== Surviving Titles and Fragments ==
288 fragments (including six dubia) of his comedies survive, along with the following 19 titles:

- Agathoi ("The Good Men")
- Agrioi ("The Wild Men," or "The Savages")
- Anthropherakles ("The Human Heracles"; possibly the same play as Pseuderakles)
- Automoloi ("The Deserters")
- Graes ("The Old Women," or "The Hags")
- Doulodidaskalos ("The Slave Teacher")
- Epilesmon ("The Forgetful Man") or Thalatta ("The Sea")
- Ipnos ("The Kitchen") or Pannychis (The All-Night Festival")
- Korianno ("Corianno")
- Krapataloi ("The Good-For-Nothings")
- Leroi ("Jewelry")
- Metalles ("The Miners")
- Metoikoi ("The Resident Aliens")
- Myrmekanthropoi ("The Ant-Men")
- Persai ("The Persians")
- Petale ("Petale")
- Tyrannis ("Tyranny")
- Cheiron ("Chiron")
- Pseuderakles ("The Fake Heracles"; possibly the same play as Anthropherakles)

The standard edition of the fragments and testimonia is in Rudolf Kassel and Colin François Lloyd Austin's Poetae Comici Graeci Vol. VII. The eight-volume Poetae Comici Graeci produced from 1983 to 2001 replaces the outdated collections Fragmenta comicorum graecorum by August Meineke (1839–1857), Comicorum Atticorum Fragmenta by Theodor Kock (1880–1888) and Comicorum Graecorum Fragmenta by Georg Kaibel (1899).
