= Anaxilas (comic poet) =

4th century BC Athenian poet of Middle Comedy

Anaxilas (Ἀναξίλας), also called Anaxilas Comicus, (fl. 340 BC) was a Greek comic poet of the Middle Comedy period. Based on his name, he has been presumed of Doric origin. He was, along with several other Middle Comedy poets (e.g. Antiphanes, Anaxandrides, Amphis, Alexis, Epicrates, Eubulides, Sophilus, and Dionysius of Sinope, all of apparently non-Attic origin) part of the increasing influence of non-Attic poets following the fifth century BC.

He was one of several comic poets mentioned by Diogenes Laërtius, as having "ridiculed" Plato.

== Surviving titles and fragments ==
Titles for twenty one of his plays are known, but only fragments of his works remain.

- The Rustic Man
- Exchange
- The Pipe-Player
- Botrylion
- Glaucus
- Manliness
- Thrasyleon
- Calypso
- Circe
- Cyclops
- Lyremakers (or possibly Perfume-makers)
- Cooks
- The Recluse
- Neottis
- Nereus
- Bird-Keepers
- Wealthy Men (or possibly Wealthy Women)
- Hyacinthus, or Hyacinthus the Pimp
- Graces
- The Goldsmith
- Seasons
