= Araros =

Araros (Ancient Greek: Ἀραρώς), son of Aristophanes, born in 387 BCE, was an Athenian comic poet of the Middle Comedy. His brothers Philippus and Nicostratus were also comic poets. Aristophanes first introduced him to public notice as the principal actor (hypocrites) in his play Plutus (388 BCE), the last comedy which he exhibited in his own name. Aristophanes wrote two more comedies, Cocalus and Aeolosikon, which were brought out in the name of Araros, probably very soon after the above date. Araros first exhibited in his own name in 375. The Suda mentions the following as his comedies:

- Adonis (erotic subject)
- Kaineus, after the mythic transgender Caeneus (erotic subject)
- Kampylion, a name of a fragmentary comedy by Eubulus, as well.
- Panos Gonai, "Birth of Pan"
- Parthenidion, "Small Virgin" (possible erotic subject, as well)
- Hymenaios, a description of a wedding

All that we know of Araros' dramatic character is contained in the following passage of Alexis, who, however, was his rival: "I want you to taste some water: I have a big water well inside more frigid than Araros".
