= Aristomenes of Athens =

Athenian poet of Old Comedy

Aristomenes (Ancient Greek: Ἀριστομένης) was a comic poet who lived in Athens in the 5th century BCE. He belonged to the ancient Attic comedy known as the Old Comedy, or more correctly to the second class of the poets constituting the old Attic comedy. For the ancients seemed to distinguish the comic poets who lived before the Peloponnesian War from those who lived during it, and Aristomenes belonged to the latter category. He was sometimes ridiculed with the name "the woodworker" (Ancient Greek: ὁ Δυροποιός), which may indicate that either he or his father was an artisan who worked with his hands, perhaps a carpenter.

As early as 425 BCE, he produced a work called "The Porters" (Ancient Greek: ὑλοφόροι), on the same occasion that The Knights of Aristophanes and the Satyroi of Cratinus were performed; and if it is true that another piece titled Admetus was performed at the same time with the Plutus of Aristophanes in 389 BCE, the dramatic career of Aristomenes must have been very long indeed, though we know of only a few comedies of Aristomenes.

Scholar August Meineke conjectures that Admetus was brought out together with the first edition of Aristophanes' Plutus, a hypothesis that later scholars have disagreed with. Of the two plays mentioned no fragments are extant; besides these we know the titles and possess a few fragments of three others:

- The Assistants (Βοηθοί) which is sometimes attributed to Aristophanes, with the names of Aristomenes and Aristophanes being often confounded in the manuscripts.
- The Charmers (Γόητες)
- Dionysus the Ascetic (Διόνυσος ἀσκητής)

There are also three fragments of which it is uncertain whether they belong to any of the plays here mentioned, or to others, the titles of which are unknown.
