= Crobylus =

Crobylus is thought to be an Athenian Middle Comedy poet, although there is no specific ancient evidence to this effect. Crobylus is said to have lived sometime after 324 BCE. He is sometimes confused with Hegesippus.

== Surviving titles and fragments ==
Eleven fragments of his comedies survive, along with three titles: The Man Who Tried to Hang Himself, The Woman Who Was Trying to Leave Her Husband or The Woman Who Left Her Husband, and Falsely Supposititious. The standard edition of the fragments and testimonia is in Rudolf Kassel and Colin François Lloyd Austin's Poetae Comici Graeci Vol. IV. The eight-volume Poetae Comici Graeci produced from 1983 to 2001 replaces the outdated collections Fragmenta comicorum graecorum by August Meineke (1839-1857), Comicorum Atticorum Fragmenta by Theodor Kock (1880-1888) and Comicorum Graecorum Fragmenta by Georg Kaibel (1899).
