= Eunicus =

Eunicus (Ancient Greek: Εὔνικος) is the name of two different people in Classical history:

- Eunicus, an Athenian comic poet of the Old Comedy, contemporary with Aristophanes and Philyllius. Only one line of his is preserved, from his play Anteia (Ἄντεια), which was also attributed to Philyllius. The title is taken from the courtesan, Anteia, who is mentioned by Demosthenes and Anaxandrides and who was also made the subject of comedies by Alexis and Antiphanes. There was also a comedy, entitled Poleis (Πόλεις) which was variously ascribed to Aristophanes, Philyllius, and Eunicus. The Suda mentions an "Aenicus" (Αἴνικος) as the author of a play called Anteia, although this is probably the same person.
- Eunicus was a distinguished statuary and silversmith of Mytilene. He seems, from the order in which he is mentioned by Pliny the Elder, to have lived not long before the time of Pompey the Great.
