= Festivals of Dionysus =

Festivals of Dionysus may refer to several celebrations held in Athens in honour of the Greek god Dionysus:

- The Dionysia, a festival of the Rural Dionysia and the City Dionysia, the central event of which was the performance and judging of tragedies and comedies
- The Anthesteria, held annually for three days in the month of Anthesterion, concentrated on celebrating the maturation of the previous year's vintage and the beginning of spring
- The Lenaia, a festival held in the month of Gamelion, including a dramatic competition which emphasized comedy more than tragedy
