= Antidotus (poet) =

Athenian poet of Old Comedy

Antidotus (Ancient Greek: Ἀντίδοτος) was an Athenian comic poet, of whom we know nothing, except that he was of the Middle Comedy period, which is evident from the fact that a certain play, the Homoia (Ὁμοία), is ascribed both to him and to the poet Alexis. We have the titles of two other plays of his, and it is thought that his name ought to be restored in Athenaeus and Julius Pollux.
