= Anaxandrides =

Ancient Greek comic poet

Anaxandrides (Ancient Greek: Ἀναξανδρίδης) was an Ancient Greek comic poet of the Middle Comedy. His father was Anaxander (Ancient Greek: Ανάξανδρος).

He was victorious ten times (test. 1. 3), first in 376, according to the Marmor Parium (FGrHist 239 A 70 = test. 3). Inscriptional evidence shows that three of his victories came at the Lenaia (IG II2 2325. 142), so the other seven must have been at the City Dionysia, including in 375 (IG II2 2318. 241), when he also took third at the Lenaia (IG Urb. Rom. 218. 5). A substantial fragment of his complete competitive record survives in IG Urb. Rom. 218. He wrote 65 plays (test. 1. 3), and his career continued into the early 340s (IG Urb. Rom. 218. 8; fourth at the City Dionysia in 349 with either Rustics or Anchises).

He was probably from the city of Camirus on Rhodes (test. 1. 1; 2. 9), although the Suda (test. 1. 2–3) also reports that "according to some authorities" he was from Colophon. In addition, the Suda (test. 1. 3–4) reports that Anaxandrides was "the first to introduce love-affairs and rapes of girls" (sc. to the comic stage).

== Surviving titles and fragments ==
82 fragments (including two dubious ones) of his comedies survive, along with 41 titles.

- Agroikoi (Rustics)
- Anchises
- Aischra (perhaps The Ugly Woman)
- Amprakiotis (Girl From Ambracia) (probably 2nd, near the end of his career)
- Anteron (The Rival In Love) (5th)
- Achilleus (Achilles)
- Gerontomania (The Madness of Old Men)
- Didymoi (Twins)
- Dionysou Gonai (Birth of Dionysus) (probably 2nd)
- Helen
- Erechtheus (City Dionysia 368; 3rd)
- Eusebeis (Pious Men)
- Zographoi (Painters) or Geographoi (Geographers, or Geographer)
- Heracles
- Thettalai (Thessalians)
- Thesauros (The Treasure)
- Theseus
- Io (City Dionysia 374; 4th)
- Kanephoros (The Ritual-Basket-Bearer)
- Cercius or Cercion
- Kitharistria (The Female Harpist)
- Kunegetai (The Hunters)
- Komodotragodia (The Comic Tragedy)
- Locrides (Women From Locris)
- Lycurgus
- Mai[nomene] (The Ma[dwoman]) (364; probably 2nd)
- Melilotos (Sweet Clover)
- Nereus
- Nereids
- Odysseus (City Dionysia between 373 and 358; 4th)
- Hoplomachos (The Expert in Hoplite Fighting)
- Pandarus
- Poleis (Cities)
- Protesilaus
- Samia (The Girl From Samos)
- Satyrias
- Sosippus
- Tereus (not victorious)
- Hybris
- Pharmacomantis (The Drug-Prophet)
- Phialephoros (The Libation-Vessel-Bearer).

The standard edition of the fragments and testimonia is in Rudolf Kassel and Colin François Lloyd Austin's Poetae Comici Graeci Vol. II. The eight-volume Poetae Comici Graeci produced from 1983 to 2001 replaces the outdated collections Fragmenta Comicorum Graecorum by August Meineke (1839-1857), Comicorum Atticorum Fragmenta by Theodor Kock (1880-1888) and Comicorum Graecorum Fragmenta by Georg Kaibel (1899).

The text has also been published with an English translation and commentary by Benjamin Millis: Anaxandrides: Introduction, Translation, Commentary (Heidelberg 2015).
