= Timocles =

Athenian poet of the Middle Comedy

Timocles (Ancient Greek: Τιμοκλῆς, fl. c. 345 BC – c. 317 BC) was one of the last Athenian comic poets of the Middle Comedy, although Pollux listed him among the writers of New Comedy. Allusions in his surviving fragments to the dispute over Halonnesus between Macedon and Athens (342 BC) and the office of gynaeconomi ("women's overseers", introduced after 317 BC by Demetrius of Phalerum) put his dates of activity in the second half of the fourth century BC.

Timocles is known to have won first prize at the Lenaea once, between 330 and 320 BC. The Suda claims that there were two comic poets of this name, but modern scholars equate the two. Unlike most Middle Comedy plays, his works featured a good deal of personal ridicule of public figures, especially orators like Demosthenes and Hyperides.

42 fragments of Timocles works survive. The titles of at least 26, and possibly 28, are known.

- Egyptians
- The Bath-House
- Georgos (uncertain: may be the title of a play, The Farmer, or the name of a character)
- The Ring
- Delos, or the Man from Delos
- Public Satyrs
- Woman Celebrating the Dionysia
- Dionysus
- Little Dragon
- Letters
- Rejoicing at Another's Misfortune
- Heroes
- Icarians, or Satyrs
- Men from Caunos
- The Centaur, or Dexamenus
- Conisalus
- Forgetfulness
- Men From Marathon
- Neaira
- Orestautocleides
- The Busybody
- The Man from Pontus
- Porphyra (also attributed to Xenarchus; Augustus Meineke and Theodor Kock, who both edited the surviving fragments of middle comedy, ascribed a play by this name only to Xenarchus)
- The Boxer
- Sappho
- Co-Workers
- Philodicastes
- The False-Robbers

== Works cited ==
- Constantinides, Elizabeth (1969). "Timocles' Ikarioi Satyroi: A Reconsideration". Transactions and Proceedings of the American Philological Association. 100: 49–61. doi:10.2307/2935900. JSTOR 2935900.
- Dover, K. J. "Timocles". Oxford Classical Dictionary (4th ed.).
- Nesselrath, Heinz-Günther (2006). "Timocles [1]". Brill's New Pauly. doi:10.1163/1574-9347_bnp_e1214730.
