= Ancient Greek comedy =

Genre of ancient Greek literature

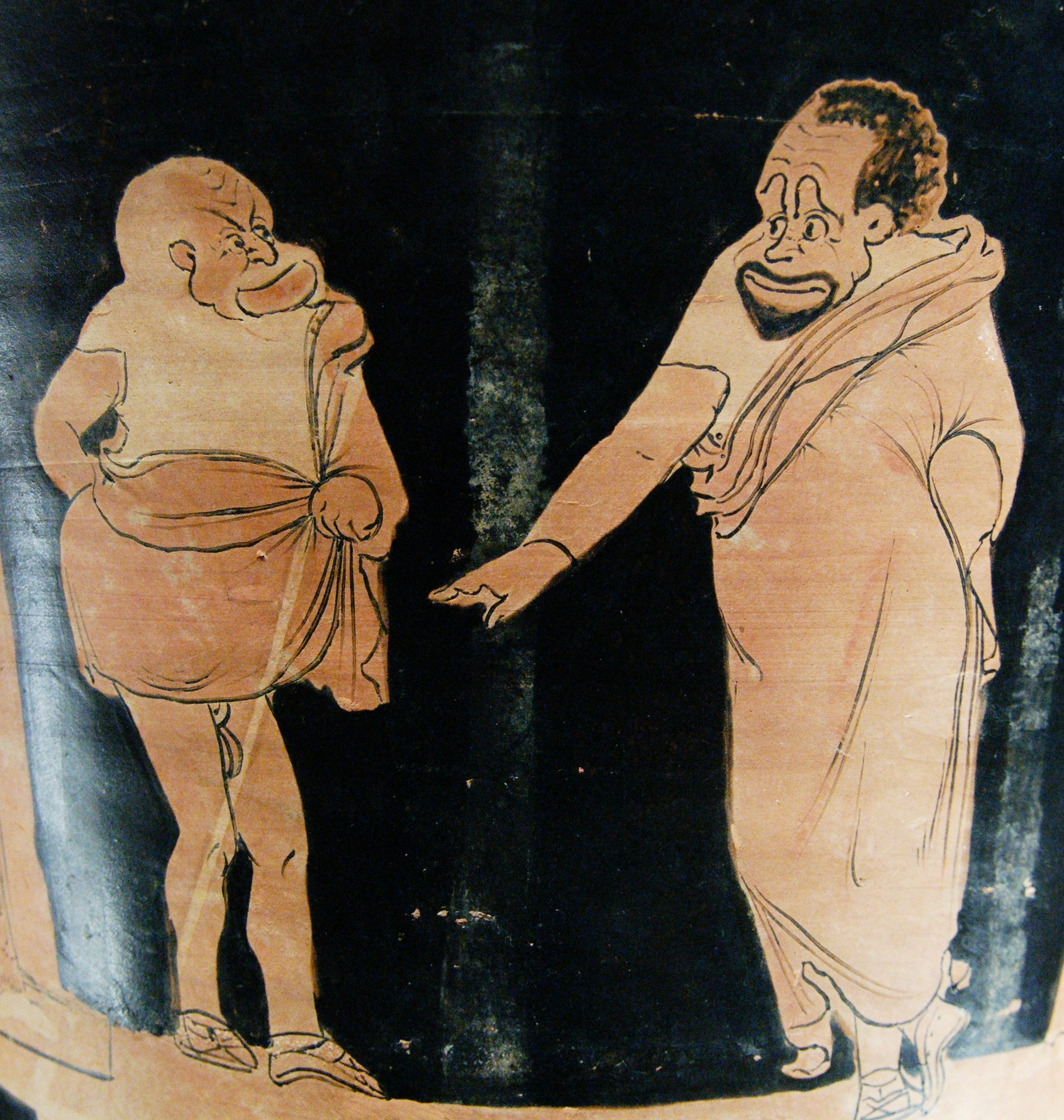
Theatrical scene with two comedic actors on a Sicilian red-figure calyx-krater c. 350–340 BC.

Ancient Greek comedy (Ancient Greek: κωμῳδία, romanized: kōmōidía) was one of the final three principal dramatic forms in the theatre of classical Greece; the others being tragedy and the satyr play. Greek comedy was distinguished from tragedy by its happy endings and use of comically exaggerated character archetypes, the latter feature being the origin of the modern concept of the comedy. Athenian comedy is conventionally divided into three periods; Old Comedy survives today largely in the form of the eleven extant plays of Aristophanes; Middle Comedy is largely lost and preserved only in relatively short fragments by authors such as Athenaeus of Naucratis; New Comedy is known primarily from the substantial papyrus fragments of Menander. A burlesque dramatic form that blended tragic and comic elements, known as phlyax play or hilarotragedy, developed in the Greek colonies of Magna Graecia by the late 4th century BC.

The philosopher Aristotle wrote in his Poetics (c. 335 BC) that comedy is a representation of laughable people and involves some kind of blunder or ugliness which does not cause pain or disaster. C. A. Trypanis wrote that comedy is the last of the great species of poetry Greece gave to the world.

== Periods ==
The Alexandrine grammarians, and most likely Aristophanes of Byzantium in particular, seem to have been the first to divide Greek comedy into what became the canonical three periods: Old Comedy (ἀρχαία archaía), Middle Comedy (μέση mésē) and New Comedy (νέα néa). These divisions appear to be largely arbitrary, and ancient comedy almost certainly developed constantly over the years.

=== Old Comedy (archaia) ===
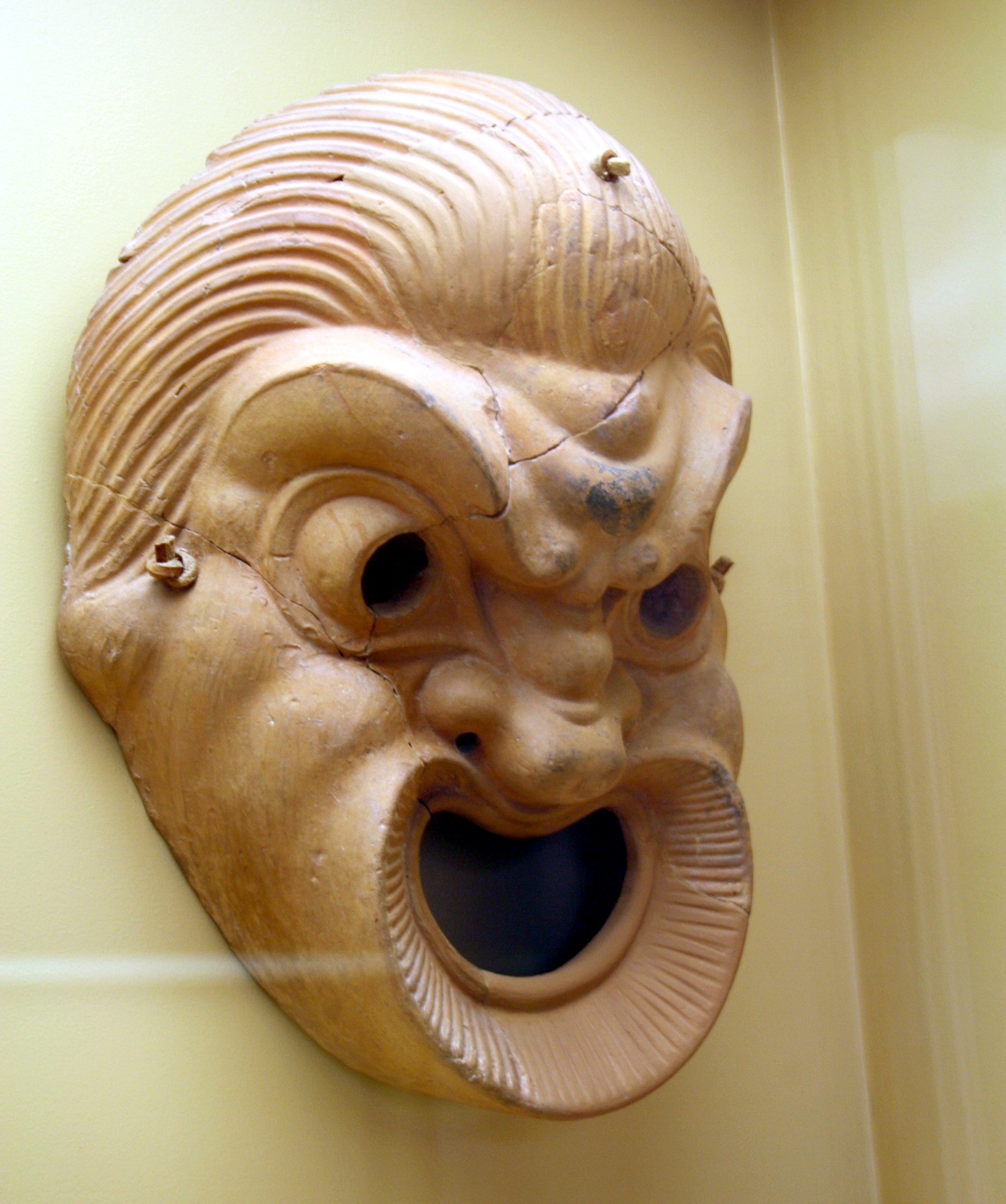
Terracotta comic theatre mask, 3rd century BC (Stoa of Attalus, Athens)

The most important Old Comic dramatist is Aristophanes (born in 446 BC). His works, with their pungent political satire and abundance of sexual and scatological innuendo, effectively define the genre today. Aristophanes lampooned the most important personalities and institutions of his day, as can be seen, for example, in his buffoonish portrayal of Socrates in The Clouds, and in his racy anti-war farce Lysistrata. He was one of a large number of comic poets working in Athens in the late 5th century BC, his most important contemporary rivals being Hermippus and Eupolis.

The Old Comedy subsequently influenced later European writers such as Rabelais, Cervantes, Swift, and Voltaire. In particular, they copied the technique of disguising a political attack as buffoonery.

=== Middle Comedy (mese) ===
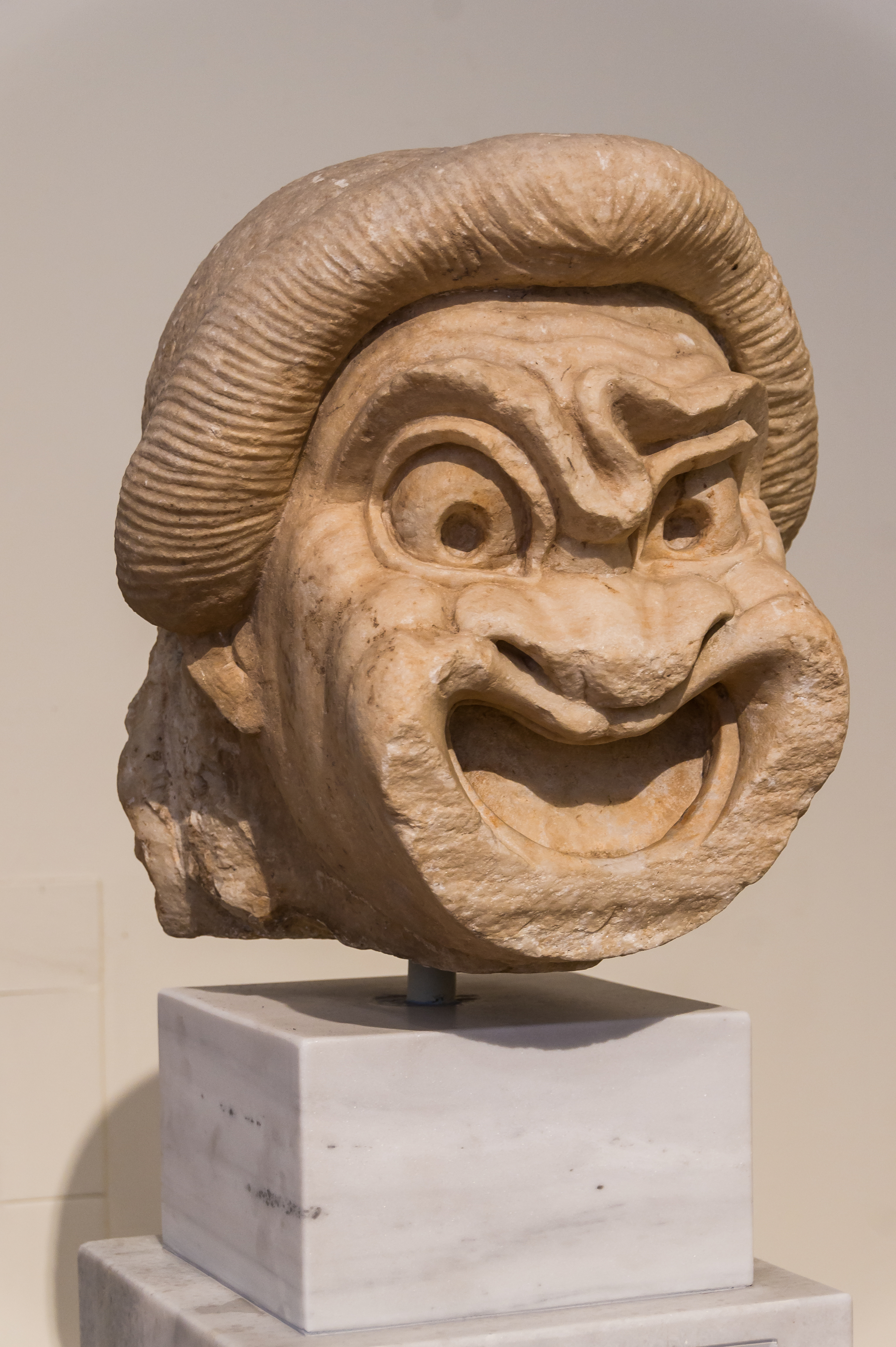
Marble image of a theatre mask, 2nd-century BC.

The line between Old and Middle Comedy is not clearly marked chronologically, Aristophanes and others of the latest writers of the Old Comedy being sometimes regarded as the earliest Middle Comic poets. For ancient scholars, the term may have meant little more than "later than Aristophanes and his contemporaries, but earlier than Menander". Middle Comedy is generally seen as differing from Old Comedy in three essential particulars: the role of the chorus was diminished to the point where it had no influence on the plot; public characters were not impersonated or personified onstage; and the objects of ridicule were general rather than personal, literary rather than political. For at least a time, mythological burlesque was popular among the Middle Comic poets. Stock characters of all sorts also emerge: courtesans, parasites, revellers, philosophers, boastful soldiers, and especially the conceited cook with his parade of culinary science.

Because no complete Middle Comic plays have been preserved, it is impossible to offer any real assessment of their literary value or "genius". But many Middle Comic plays appear to have been revived in Sicily and Magna Graecia in this period, suggesting that they had considerable widespread literary and social influence.

=== New Comedy (nea) ===
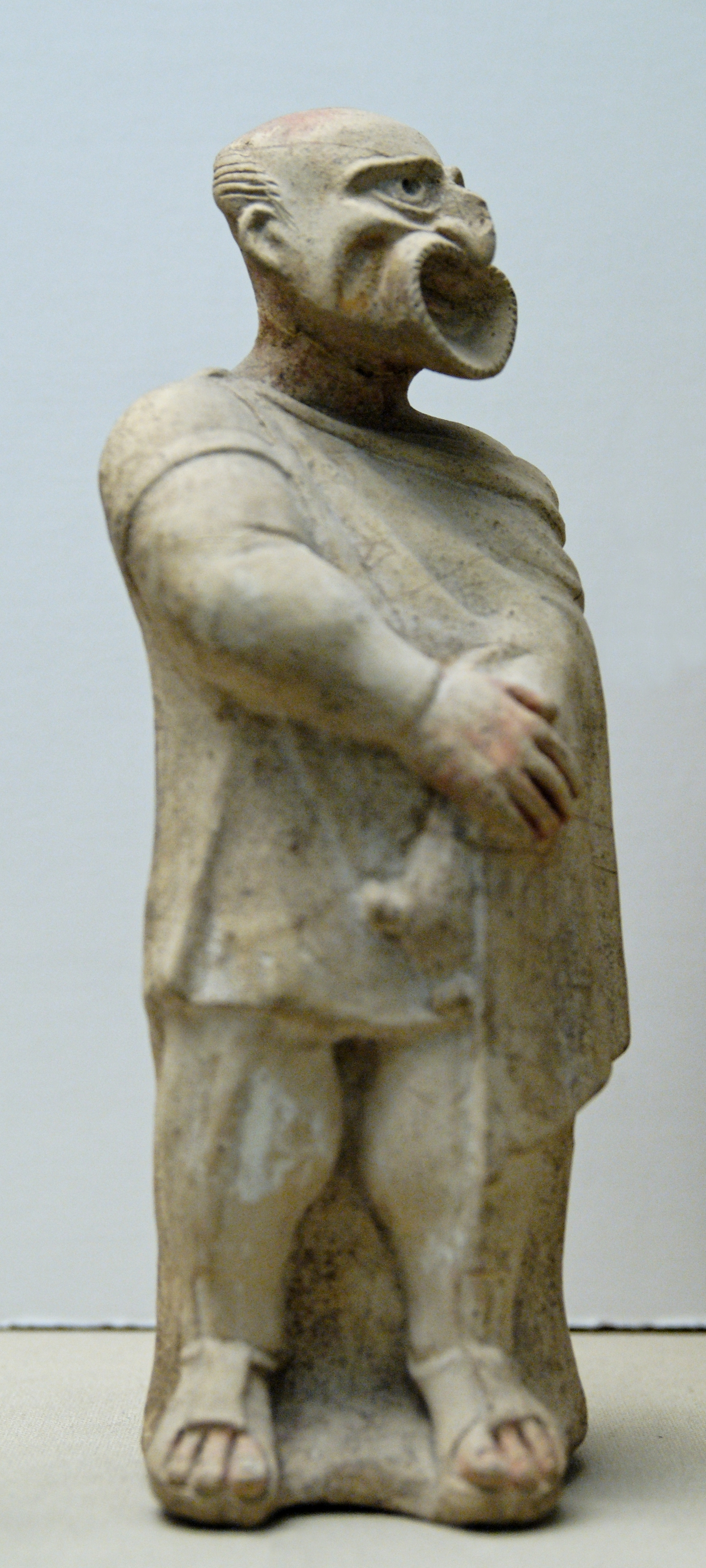
An actor in the mask of a bald man, 2nd century BC

New Comedy followed the death of Alexander the Great in 323 BC and lasted throughout the reign of the Macedonian rulers, ending about 260 BC. It is comparable to situation comedy and comedy of manners. The three best-known playwrights belonging to this genre are Menander, Philemon, and Diphilus.

The playwrights of the New Comedy genre built on the legacy from their predecessors, but adapted it to the portrayal of everyday life, rather than of public affairs. The satirical and farcical element which featured so strongly in Aristophanes' comedies was increasingly abandoned, the de-emphasis of the grotesque—whether in the form of choruses, humour or spectacle—opening the way for greater representation of daily life and the foibles of recognisable character types.

Apart from Diphilus, the New Comedians preferred the everyday world to mythological themes, coincidences to miracles or metamorphoses; and they peopled this world with a whole series of semi-realistic, if somewhat stereotypical figures, who would become the stock characters of Western comedy: braggarts, the permissive father figure and the stern father (senex iratus), young lovers, parasites, kind-hearted prostitutes, and cunning servants. Their largely gentle comedy of manners drew on a vast array of dramatic devices, characters and situations their predecessors had developed: prologues to shape the audience's understanding of events, messengers' speeches to announce offstage action, descriptions of feasts, the complications of love, sudden recognitions, ex machina endings were all established techniques which playwrights exploited and evoked. The new comedy depicted Athenian society and the social morality of the period, presenting it in attractive colors but making no attempt to criticize or improve it.

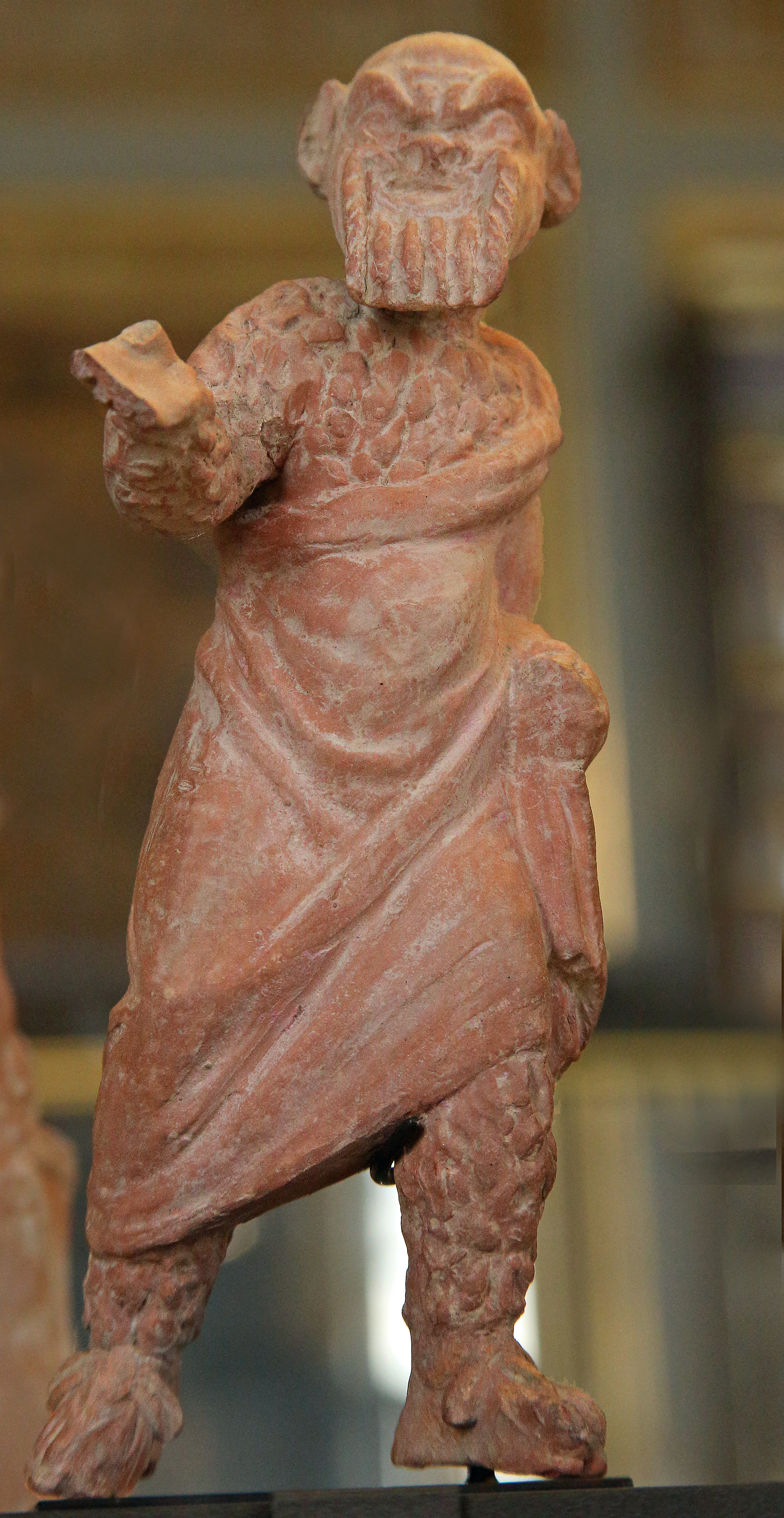
Possible depiction of Knemon from Menander's play Dyskolos (the Grouch)

In his own time, Philemon was perhaps the most successful among the New Comedy, regularly beating the younger figure of Menander in contests; but the latter would be the most highly esteemed by subsequent generations. Menander's comedies not only provided their audience with a brief respite from reality, but also gave audiences an accurate, if not greatly detailed, picture of life, leading an ancient critic to ask if life influenced Menander in the writing of his plays or if the case was vice versa. Unlike earlier predecessors, Menander's comedies tended to centre on the fears and foibles of the ordinary man, his personal relationships, family life and social mishaps rather than politics and public life. His plays were also much less satirical than preceding comedies, being marked by a gentle, urbane tone, a taste for good temper and good manners (if not necessarily for good morals).

The human dimension of his characters was one of the strengths of Menander's plays, and perhaps his greatest legacy, through his use of these fairly stereotypical characters to comment on human life and depict human folly and absurdity compassionately, with wit and subtlety. An example of the moral reformations he offered (not always convincingly) is Cnemon from Menander's play Dyskolos, whose objections to life suddenly fade after he was rescued from a well. The fact that this character was not necessarily closed to reason makes him a character whom people can relate to.

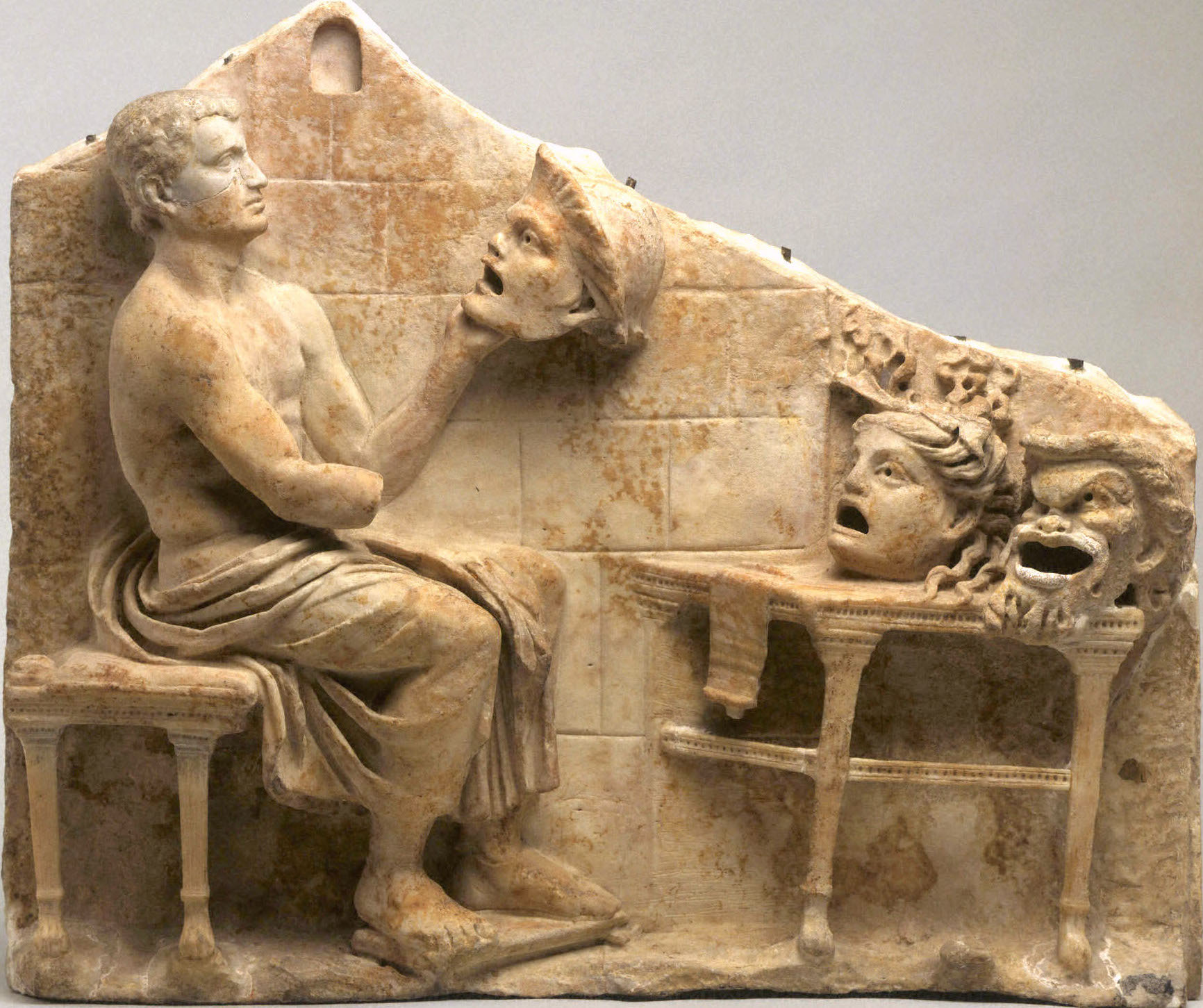
Roman, Republican or Early Imperial, Relief of a seated poet (Menander) with masks of New Comedy, 1st century BC – early 1st century AD, Princeton University Art Museum

Philemon's comedies tended to be smarter, and broader in tone, than Menander's; while Diphilus used mythology as well as everyday life in his works. The comedies of both survive only in fragments but their plays were translated and adapted by Plautus. Examples include Plautus' Asinaria and Rudens. Based on the translation and adaptation of Diphilus' comedies by Plautus, one can conclude that he was skilled in the construction of his plots.

Substantial fragments of New Comedy have survived, but no complete plays. The most substantially preserved text is the Dyskolos ("Difficult Man, Grouch") by Menander, discovered on a papyrus, and first published in 1958. The Cairo Codex (found in 1907) also preserves long sections of plays including Epitrepontes ("Men at Arbitration"), Samia ("The Girl from Samos"), and Perikeiromene ("The Girl who had her Hair Shorn"). Much of the rest of our knowledge of New Comedy is derived from the Latin adaptations by Plautus and Terence.

==== Influence ====
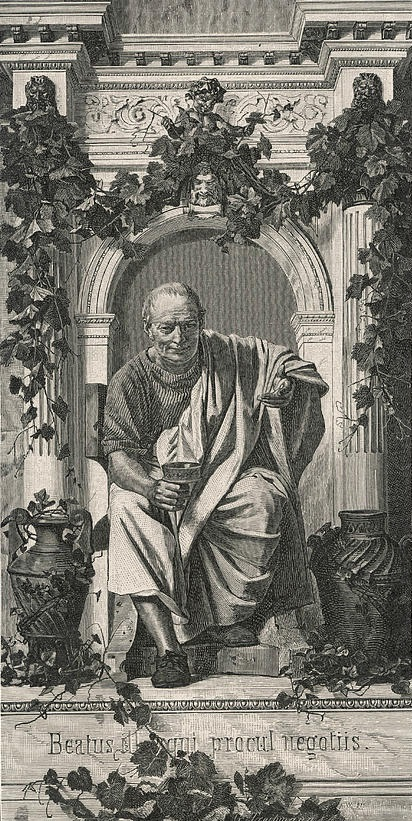
Horace "Quintus Horatius Flaccus", by Anton von Werner

Horace claimed Menander as a model for his own gentle brand of Roman satire.

The New Comedy influenced much of Western European literature, primarily through Plautus and Terence: in particular the comic drama of Shakespeare and Ben Jonson, Congreve, and Wycherley, and, in France, Molière.

The 5-act structure later to be found in modern plays can first be seen in Menander's comedies. Where in comedies of previous generations there were choral interludes, there was dialogue with song. The action of his plays had breaks, the situations in them were conventional and coincidences were convenient, thus showing the smooth and effective development of his plays.

Much of contemporary romantic and situational comedy descends from the New Comedy sensibility, in particular generational comedies such as All in the Family and Meet the Parents.

== Dramatists ==
=== Old Comedy ===
- Susarion of Megara (fl. c. 580 BC)
- Epicharmus of Kos (fl. between c. 540 – c. 450 BC)
- Phormis (late 6th century)
- Dinolochus (fl. 487 BC)
- Euetes (fl. 485 BC)
- Euxenides (fl. 485 BC)
- Mylus (fl. 485 BC)
- Chionides (fl. 487 BC)
- Magnes (fl. 472 BC)
- Cratinus (519–422 BC), won a series of victories from 454 BC to 423 BC
- Euphonius (fl. 458 BC)
- Crates (fl. c. 450 BC)
- Ecphantides
- Pisander
- Epilycus
- Callias Schoenion
- Hermippus (fl. 435 BC)
- Myrtilus (5th century)
- Lysimachus
- Hegemon of Thasos, 413 BC
- Sophron
- Phrynichus, won 4 victories between 435 BC and 405 BC
- Lycis, before 405 BC
- Leucon
- Lysippus
- Eupolis (c. 446–411 BC)
- Aristophanes (c. 456–386 BC), won more than 12 victories between 427 BC and 388 BC
- Ameipsias (c. 420 BC)
- Aristomenes, between 431 and 388 BC
- Telecleides 5th century BC
- Pherecrates 420 BC
- Plato
- Diocles of Phlius
- Sannyrion
- Philyllius, 394 BC
- Hipparchus
- Archippus, 415 BC
- Polyzelus, c. 364 BC
- Philonides
- Xenophon
- Autocrates
- Eunicus 5th century BC
- Apollophanes c. 400 BC
- Nicomachus, c. 420 BC
- Cephisodorus 402 BC
- Metagenes, c. 419 BC
- Cantharus (comic poet) 422 BC
- Nicochares (died c. 345)
- Strattis (c. 412–390 BC)
- Alcaeus, 388 BC
- Theopompus

=== Middle Comedy ===
- Nicophon 5th century BC
- Eubulus early 4th century BC
- Araros, son of Aristophanes 388, 375
- Antiphanes (c. 408–334 BC)
- Anaxandrides 4th century BC
- Calliades 4th century BC
- Nicostratus, son of Aristophanes
- Phillipus, son of Aristophanes
- Athenion possibly 4th century BC
- Philetarus c. 390 BC – c. 320 BC
- Anaxilas, fl. 340 BC
- Ophelion
- Callicrates
- Heraclides
- Alexis (c. 375–275 BC)
- Amphis mid-4th century BC
- Axionicus
- Cratinus Junior
- Eriphus, plagiarist of Antiphanes
- Epicrates of Ambracia 4th century BC
- Stephanus, 332 BC
- Strato
- Aristophon
- Sotades
- Augeas
- Ephippus
- Heniochus
- Epigenes
- Mnesimachus
- Timotheus
- Sophilus
- Antidotus
- Naucrates
- Xenarchus
- Dromo Comicus
- Crobylus, possibly New Comedy, after 324 BC
- Timocles 324 BC
- Damoxenus (playwright) c. 370–270 BC
- Xenarchus, around 393 BC

=== New Comedy ===
- Eubelus
- Philippides, 335 BC, 301 BC
- Philemon of Soli or Syracuse (c. 362–262 BC)
- Menander (c. 342–291 BC)
- Apollodorus of Carystus (c. 300–260 BC)
- Diphilus of Sinope (c. 340–290 BC)
- Euphron
- Dionysius Chalcus, after the god Archestratus
- Theophilus, contemporary with Callimedon
- Sosippus, contemporary with Diphillus
- Anaxippus, 303 BC
- Demetrius, 299 BC
- Archedicus, 302 BC
- Sopater, 282 BC
- Phoenicides of Megara, around 280 to 260 BC
- Hegesippus
- Plato Junior
- Theognetus
- Bathon
- Diodorus
- Machon of Corinth/Alexandria 3rd century BC
- Posidippus (comic poet) (c. 316–250 BC)
- Laines or Laenes 185 BC
- Philemon 183 BC
- Chairion or Chaerion 154 BC
- Alciphron

Some dramatists overlap into more than one period.

== See also ==
- Competitions (agon) at the Dionysia (mixed audiences) and Lenaia (local Athens audience only) festivals
- Cult of Dionysus
- Phallic processions
- Theatre of Dionysus
- Prolegomena de comoedia

== Sources ==
- Brown, Andrew. 1998. "Ancient Greece." In The Cambridge Guide to Theatre. Ed. Martin Banham. Cambridge: Cambridge University Press. 441–447. ISBN 0-521-43437-8.
- Brockett, Oscar G. and Franklin J. Hildy. 2003. History of the Theatre. Ninth edition, International edition. Boston: Allyn and Bacon. ISBN 0-205-41050-2.
- Carlson, Marvin. 1993. Theories of the Theatre: A Historical and Critical Survey from the Greeks to the Present. Expanded ed. Ithaca and London: Cornell University Press. ISBN 978-0-8014-8154-3.
- Csapo, Eric, and William J. Slater. 1994. The Context of Ancient Drama. Ann Arbor: University of Michigan Press. ISBN 0-472-08275-2.
- Freund, Philip. 2003. The Birth of Theatre. Illustrated ed. Vol 1. of Stage by Stage. London: Peter Owen. ISBN 978-0-7206-1167-0.
- Janko, Richard, trans. 1987. Poetics with Tractatus Coislinianus, Reconstruction of Poetics II and the Fragments of the On Poets. By Aristotle. Cambridge: Hackett. ISBN 0-87220-033-7.
- Ley, Graham. 2006. A Short Introduction to the Ancient Greek Theater. Rev. ed. Chicago and London: University of Chicago Press ISBN 0-226-47761-4.
- Olson, S. Douglas, ed. 2007. Broken Laughter: Select Fragments of Greek Comedy. Oxford: Oxford University Press. ISBN 978-0-19-928785-7.
- Taplin, Oliver. 1993. Comic Angels and Other Approaches to Greek Drama Through Vase-Painting. Oxford: Clarendon Press ISBN 0-19-814797-X.
- Trypanis, Constantine Athanasius. 1981. Greek Poetry from Homer to Seferis. Chicago: University of Chicago Press ISBN 0-226-81316-9.
