= Onomasti komodein =

Onomasti komodein (Ancient Greek: ὀνομαστὶ κωμῳδεῖν, onomastì kōmōideîn, "to ridicule by name in the manner of the comic poets") was an expression used in ancient Greece to denote a witty personal attack made with total freedom against the most notable individuals (see Aristophanes' attacks on Cleon, Socrates, Euripides) in order to expose their wrongful conduct.

An opinion which originated in the Peripatetic school is that onomasti komodein was the fundamental characterizing aspect of the ancient Greek comedy of the first period (known as Old Comedy).

== See also ==
- Satire
