= Metagenes (poet) =

Athenian comic poet

Metagenes (Ancient Greek: Μεταγένης) was an Athenian comic poet of the Old Comedy, contemporary with Aristophanes, Phrynichus, and Plato.

The Suda records his father's name as Dylos, but modern scholars regard this reading as uncertain; one proposed emendation is Diyllos.

The Suda gives the following titles of his plays: Αὖραι (Breezes), Μαμμάκυθος (Blockhead), Θουριοπέρσαι (Thouriopersians), Φιλοθύτης (Sacrifice-lover), Ὅμηρος ἢ Ἀσκηταί (Homer or Athletes), some of which appear to be corrupt.
