= Cratinus =

Ancient Athenian comic poet

Cratinus (Ancient Greek: Κρατῖνος; c. 519 BC – c. 422 BC) was an Athenian comic poet of the Old Comedy.

== Life ==
Cratinus won prizes for his plays on 27 known occasions, eight times at the City Dionysia, first probably in the mid-to-late 450s BCE (IG II2 2325. 50), and three times at the Lenaia, first probably in the early 430s (IG II2 2325. 121; just before Pherecrates and Hermippus). He was still competing in 423 BC, when his Pytine took the prize at the City Dionysia; he died shortly thereafter, at a very advanced age, about 97 years (test. 3).

Little is known of his personal history. His father's name was Callimedes, and he himself was a taxiarch. The Suda accuses Cratinus of immorality, excessive cowardice, and habitual intemperance. His contemporaries offer no corroboration, except for the third charge, which is sustained by many passages of Aristophanes and other writers. They also refer the "Confession of Cratinus", which Cratinus himself seems to have treated the subject in a very amusing way, especially in his Pytine.

That he was related to the 4th-century comic poet Cratinus Junior is a reasonable hypothesis but cannot be proven.

== Works ==
Cratinus was regarded as one of the three great masters of Athenian Old Comedy (the others being Aristophanes and Eupolis). Although his poetry is several times described as relatively graceless, harsh, and crudely abusive (test. 17; 19), his plays continued to be read and studied in the Hellenistic and Roman periods. He wrote 21 comedies. They were chiefly distinguished by their direct and vigorous political satire. 514 fragments (including ten dubia) of his comedies survive, along with 29 titles. His most famous play is the Pytine.

=== Pytine ===
The Pytine (The Wineflask) was Cratinus' most famous play. A grammarian describes the background of the play as follows: In 424 BC, Aristophanes produced The Knights, in which he described Cratinus "as a drivelling old man, wandering about with his crown withered, and so utterly neglected by his former admirers that he could not even procure to quench the thirst of which he was perishing" Soon after that play, Cratinus responded by producing a play called Pytine (The Wineflask) in 423 BC, which defeated the Connus of Ameipsias and The Clouds of Aristophanes, which was produced in the same year.

=== Other plays ===
In Grenfell and Hunt's Oxyrhynchus Papyri, iv. (1904), containing a further instalment of their edition of the Behnesa papyri discovered by them in 1896–1897, one of the greatest curiosities is a scrap of paper bearing the argument of a play by Cratinus, the Dionysalexandros (i.e. Dionysus in the part of Paris), aimed against Pericles; and the epitome reveals something of its wit and point. Other plays of Cratinus include

- Archilochoi ("The Archilochuses") (c. 448 BC)
- Boukoloi ("The Cow-Herds")
- Bousiris ("Busiris")
- Deliades ("Women From Delos")
- Didaskaliai ("The Rehearsals")
- Drapetides ("Female Runaways")
- Empipramenoi ("Men On Fire") or Idaioi ("The Idaeans")
- Euneidai ("Children of Euneus")
- Thrattai ("Women From Thrace")
- Kleoboulinai ("The Cleobulines")
- Lakones ("The Laconians")
- Malthakoi ("The Soft Ones")
- Nemesis ("Nemesis")
- Nomoi ("The Laws")
- Odysseis ("The Odysseuses")
- Panoptai ("The All-Seers")
- Ploutoi ("The Gods of Wealth")
- Pylaia ("The Meeting At Pylae")
- Satyroi ("Satyrs"), won 2nd prize at the Lenaea of 424 BC
- Seriphioi ("Men From Seriphus")
- Trophonios ("Trophonius")
- Cheimazomenoi ("Storm-Tossed Men"), won 2nd prize at Lenaea of 425 BC
- Cheirones ("The Chirons")
- Horai ("The Hours")

462 fragments of Cratinus survive.

== Style ==
The style of Cratinus has been likened to that of Aeschylus. He appears to have been fond of lofty diction and bold figures, and was most successful in the lyrical parts of his dramas, his choruses being the popular festal songs of his day. According to the statement of a doubtful authority, not borne out by Aristotle, Cratinus increased the number of actors in comedy to three.

== Standard edition ==
The standard edition of the fragments and testimonia is in Rudolf Kassel and Colin François Lloyd Austin's Poetae Comici Graeci Vol. IV. The eight-volume Poetae Comici Graeci produced from 1983 to 2001 replaces the outdated collections Fragmenta comicorum graecorum by August Meineke (1839-1857), Comicorum Atticorum Fragmenta by Theodor Kock (1880-1888) and Comicorum Graecorum Fragmenta by Georg Kaibel (1899).
