= Epilycus =

Athenian comic poet of the Old Comedy

Epilycus (Greek: Ἐπίλυκος) was an Athenian comic poet of the Old Comedy. He is mentioned by an ancient grammarian in connection with Aristophanes and Philyllius. Of his play Kôraliskos, a few fragments are preserved.

An epic poet of the same name, a brother of the comic poet Crates, is mentioned in the Suda.
