= Eubulus (poet) =

4th-century BC Athenian poet of Middle Comedy

Eubulus (Ancient Greek: Εὔβουλος, Euboulos) was an Athenian Middle Comedy poet, victorious six times at the Lenaia, first probably in the late 370s or 360s BC (IG II2 2325.144; just before Ephippus)

According to the Suda (test. 1), which dates him to the 101st Olympiad (i.e. 376/2) and identifies him as "on the border between the Middle and the Old Comedy", he produced 104 comedies and won six victories at the Lenaia. An obscure notice in a scholium on Plato (test. 4) appears to suggest that some of his plays were staged by Aristophanes’ son Philippus. He attacked Philocrates, Callimedon, Cydias, and Dionysius the tyrant of Syracuse.

Eubulus's plays were chiefly about mythological subjects and often parodied the tragic playwrights, especially Euripides.

== Surviving titles and fragments ==
150 fragments (including three dubia) of his comedies survive, along with fifty-eight titles:

- Ancylion
- Anchises
- Amaltheia
- Anasozomenoi ("Men Who Were Trying To Get Home Safe")
- Antiope
- Astytoi ("Impotent Men")
- Auge
- Bellerophon
- Ganymede
- Glaucus
- Daedalus
- Danae
- Deucalion
- Dionysius
- Dolon
- Eirene ("Peace")
- Europa
- Echo
- Ixion
- Ion
- Kalathephoroi ("Basket-Bearers")
- Campylion
- Katakollomenos ("The Man Who Was Glued To the Spot")
- Cercopes
- Clepsydra
- Korydalos ("The Lark")
- Kybeutai ("Dice-Players")
- Lakones ("Spartans") or Leda
- Medea
- Mylothris ("The Mill-Girl")
- Mysians
- Nannion
- Nausicaa
- Neottis
- Xuthus
- Odysseus or Panoptai ("Men Who See Everything")
- Oedipus
- Oenimaus or Pelops
- Olbia
- Orthanes
- Pamphilus
- Pannychis ("The All-Night Festival")
- Parmeniscus
- Pentathlos ("The Pentathlete")
- Plangon
- Pornoboskos ("The Pimp")
- Procris
- Prosousia or Cycnus
- Semele or Dionysus
- Skyteus ("The Shoemaker")
- Stephanopolides ("Female Garland-Vendors")
- Sphingokarion ("Sphinx-Carion")
- Titans
- Tithai or Titthe ("Wet-Nurses" or Wet-Nurse")
- Phoenix
- Charites ("The Graces")
- Chrysilla
- Psaltria ("The Harp-Girl")

The standard edition of the fragments and testimonia is in Rudolf Kassel and Colin François Lloyd Austin's Poetae Comici Graeci Vol. V. The eight-volume Poetae Comici Graeci produced from 1983 to 2001 replaces the outdated collections Fragmenta comicorum graecorum, Comicorum Atticorum Fragmenta by Theodor Kock (1880-1888) and Comicorum Graecorum Fragmenta by Georg Kaibel (1899).

Richard L. Hunter offers a careful study of Eubulus’ career and the fragments of his plays in Eubulus: The Fragments.
