= Strattis =

Athenian poet of Old Comedy (fl. 412–380 BC)

Strattis (Ancient Greek: Στράττις) was an Athenian comic poet of the Old Comedy. According to the Suda, he flourished later than Callias Schoenion. Therefore, it is likely that his poetry was performed at the 92nd Olympiad, that is, 412 BC.

Strattis was a contemporary of Sannyrion and Philyllius, both of whom were attacked in the extant fragments of his plays. The drama in which Philyllius was attacked was the Potamioi. According to the scholiast of Aristophanes, this drama was performed before Aristophanes' Ecclesiazusae. Therefore, this could not be later than 394/3 BC.

Also, in his Anthroporrhaistes, Strattis attacked Hegelochus, the actor of the Orestes of Euripides. Therefore this play would have been performed later than 408 BC, the year in which the Orestes was performed.

Strattis was performing his works at the end of the 99th Olympiad, that is, 380 BC, when he attacked Isocrates on account of his fondness for Lagisca when he was far advanced in years.

Some authors call him, inaccurately, Strato. Some scholars believed the comic poets Strato and Strattis to be the same person, but this idea is now considered by most classicists as to be incorrect.

== Surviving Titles and Fragments ==
The Suda gives a list of his works:

- The Destroyer of Men (Ἀνθρωπορραίστης)
- Atalante (Ἀταλάντη)
- Good Men or Disappearance of the Money (Ἀγαθοί ἤτοι Ἀργυρίου ἀφανισμός)
- Iphigeron (Ἰφιγέρων)
- Callippides (Καλλιππίδης)
- Cinesias (Κινησίας)
- Limnomedon (Λιμνομέδων)
- Macedonians or Pausanias (Μακεδόνες ἢ Παυσανίας)
- Medea (Μήδεια)
- Troilus (Τρωΐλος)
- Phoenician Women (Φοίνισσαι)
- Philoctetes (Φιλοκτήτης)
- Chrysippus (Χρύσιππος)
- Psychastae (Ψυχασταί)

This list is not complete. Other writers mention four more plays:

- Zopyros Surrounded By Flames (Ζώπυρος Περικαιόμενος)
- Myrmidons (Μυρμιδόνες)
- Potamioi (Ποτάμιοι)
- Pytisos (Πυτίσιος)

== Studies ==
- Christian Orth, Strattis: die Fragmente. Ein Kommentar (Berlin: Verlag Antike, 2009) (Studia comica, 2).
