= Alcaeus (comic poet) =

Ancient Athenian comic poet

Alcaeus (Ancient Greek: Ἀλκαῖος), the son of Miccus, was an Athenian comic poet. His comedies marked the transition between Old Comedy and Middle Comedy. In 388 BC, his play Pasiphae was awarded the fifth (i.e. last) place prize in the same contest that Aristophanes exhibited his play Plutus.

Fabricius mentions another Alcaeus, a tragedian. This appears to be the same person as Alcaeus the comic poet.

== Surviving titles and fragments ==
Alcaeus was reported to have written ten plays. The titles of eight plays still exist, along with forty fragments altogether (seven of which are dubious, and may instead be by the better-known lyric poet), most of which suggest that he worked mainly in mythological subjects.

- Adephai Moicheuomenai ("The Adulterous Sisters")
- Callisto
- Endymion
- Hieros Gamos ("Holy Marriage")
- Komadotragodia ("Comedo-Tragedy")
- Palaistra ("Palaestra")
- Panymedes
- Pasiphae

== Works cited ==
- Storey, Ian, ed. (2011). Fragments of Old Comedy: Alcaeus to Diocles. Cambridge, MA: Harvard University Press. ISBN 978-0674996625.
