= Athenion (comic poet) =

Ancient Greek comic poet

Athenion (Ancient Greek: Ἀθηνίων) was a poet of Ancient Greek comedy. The Greek grammarian Athenaeus preserves an extensive extract from one of his plays, The Samothracians (Σαμόρακες), in which a chef discourses philosophically about the role cooking plays in civilized society, namely that it "lured early humans away from cannibalism".

His time is uncertain. We know for certain only that he lived in or before the time of Athenaeus, that is, the 3rd century CE. Stylistically, some scholars place him with Middle Comedy and guess he lived some time around the 4th century BCE, while others have placed him in the 3rd or even mid 1st century BCE (though it is possible some scholars have confused him with the mid 1st century BCE actor Athenion).
