= Sannyrion =

Athenian poet of Old Comedy

Sannyrion (Ancient Greek: Σαννυρίων) was an Athenian comic poet of the late 5th century BC, and a contemporary of Diocles and Philyllius, according to the Suda. He belonged to the later years of Old Comedy and the start of Middle Comedy.

== Works ==
Sannyrion wrote the following works.

- Τέλως Telōs ("Finally")
- Δανάη Danae
- Ιώ Io
- Σαρδανάπαλλος Sardanapalus (The title could have been mistaken by Suda; reading a passage of Athenaeus strongly suggests that Suda mistook it for the play by Strattis mentioned above, Psychastae (Ψυχασταί).)

In Aristophanes' Gerytades, Sannyrion, Meletus, and Cinesias are chosen as ambassadors from the poets to the shades below because they are so skinny.

== Hegelochus ==
Sannyrion is one of the sources for the story of Hegelochus, an actor who was lampooned for a slight but comic mispronunciation while appearing in Euripides' Orestes in 408 BC that ruined his career.
