= Eupolis =

5th-century BC Athenian playwright of Old Comedy

Eupolis Εὔπολις
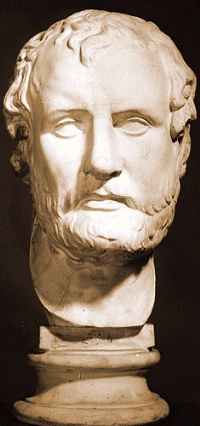
- Herma portraying Eupolis recovered in 1988 (current location: National Archaeological Museum, Athens)
- Born: c. 446 BC
- Died: c. 411 BC (aged c. 35)

Eupolis (Ancient Greek: Εὔπολις; c. 446 – c. 411 BC) was an Athenian poet of the Old Comedy, who flourished during the time of the Peloponnesian War.

== Biography ==
Very little is known about Eupolis' life. His father was named Sosipolis. There are few sources on when he first appeared on the stage. A short history of Greek Comedy, written by an anonymous writer of antiquity, reported that Eupolis first produced a play in the year when Apollodorus was the Eponymous archon, which would be 430/429 BC. The same source claims Phrynichus also had his debut that year. However, the Chronicon of Eusebius of Caesarea places Eupolis' debut in 428–27 BC and adds that Aristophanes also produced a play that year. This is the version preserved in the Latin translation by Jerome. But the Armenian translation places the event in 427/426 BC.

Cyril of Alexandria placed the debut of Eupolis at some point between 428 and 424 BC, and placed the debuts of Aristophanes and Plato the comic poet during that same period. George Syncellus gives the same dates, but merely states that Eupolis and Aristophanes were becoming prominent, not when they had their debuts. Syncellus also includes Sophocles. Sophocles had actually become the pre-eminent playwright in Athens c. 456 BC, around when Aeschylus died.

Based on the primary sources above, modern historians conclude that Eupolis had his debut as a playwright during the 420s BC, probably in 429 BC. His first production was probably at the Lenaia, the lesser theatrical festival of his time. The Lenaia are thought to have allowed novices to compete, so they could prove themselves before presenting plays at the Dionysia festival. His first known play was either Prospaltioi or Heilotes. Surviving fragments from the Prospaltioi include allusions to, and near-quotations of, Sophocles' Antigone (442 BC). Scholars are convinced the play targeted Pericles, due to a famous reference to Aspasia. This makes it likely that Pericles, who died in 429 BC, was still alive when Eupolis was working on the text.

The Suda claims Eupolis was only 17 years old when he started his career. (This would place his birth around 447/446 BC.) Sources also claim Aristophanes and Menander were adolescents (epheboi) at the start of their own careers. This suggests a tradition concerning the precociousness of poets.

Although he was at first on good terms with Aristophanes, their relationship subsequently became strained, and they accused each other, in most virulent terms, of imitation and plagiarism. (Note: Aristophanes) In the parabasis of his play The Clouds, Aristophanes publicly accused Eupolis' play Maricas of being a copy of fellow comic Phrynichus and his own Knights:

Eupolis, indeed, first of all craftily introduced his Maricas, / having basely, base fellow, spoiled by altering my play of the Knights, / having added to it, for the sake of the cordax, a drunken old woman, whom / Phrynichus long ago poetized, whom the whale was for devouring. —(Chorus [leader], in The Clouds, line 553–556, transl. William James Hickie, 1871)

== Works ==
Eupolis obtained first prize seven times, but only fragments remain of the 19 titles attributed to him. Of these, the best known are:

- Kolakes ("Flatterers"), in which he pilloried the spendthrift Callias, who wasted his money on sophists and parasites. This play won first prize in the City Dionysia of 421 BC, defeating Aristophanes' Peace.
- Maricas, an attack on Hyperbolus, the successor of Cleon, under a fictitious name.
- Baptai ("Dippers," Latinization: Baptae), against Alcibiades and his groups, at which profligate foreign rites were practised. The word Baptai was a name given to the priests of the Thracian goddess Cotytto.
- Demoi ("Demes") and Poleis ("Cities") were political plays, dealing with the desperate condition of the state and with the allied (or tributary) cities.

Other people he attacked in his plays were Socrates, Cimon, and Cleon. The following 14 titles (with associated fragments) are also ascribed to Eupolis:

- Aiges ("Goats")
- Astrateutoi ("People Exempt From Military Service"), or Androgynai ("Androgynes")
- Autolykos ("Autolycus", two versions)
- Diaiton ("Arbiter")
- Dias ("Dias")
- Heilotes ("Helots")
- Klopai ("Thefts")
- Lakones ("Laconians")
- Noumeniai ("New-Moon Festival"), which won third prize at the Lenaea of 425 BC.
- Prospaltioi ("Men From Prospalta")
- Taxiarchoi ("Brigadiers")
- Hybristodikai ("Abusers of Justice")
- Philoi ("Friends")
- Chrysoun Genos ("The Golden Race (or Species)")

Ian Storey estimates a total output of 14 or 15 works for Eupolis, noting the doubtful paternity of some of the works attributed to the poet. He considers his career to have lasted from 429 to 411 BC, a period of 18 years.

== Death and burial ==
Ian Storey notes that there are "four ancient traditions" on the manner of death and burial of Eupolis, each with details impossible to reconcile to each other. The first tradition is "the well-known story" concerning Alcibiades. Eupolis targeted that politician in his play Baptai, but then found himself serving under Alcibiades in the Sicilian Expedition. Alcibiades retaliated by having the poet drowned on the way to Sicily. This would place Eupolis' death in "the late spring or early summer" of 415 BC. The story, with small variations, can be found in the writings of Juvenal, Aelius Aristides, Themistius, Platonios, John Tzetzes and the Anonymus Crameri. The latter two add two new details. First, that Eupolis made fun of Alcibiades' rhotacism. Second, that soldiers dunked the poet repeatedly in the sea, making it unclear if the poet drowned or survived the experience. The story was reported in several ancient sources, but it also had its detractors. Eratosthenes pointed out that there were works by Eupolis which were produced following the Sicilian Expedition. Cicero quoted Eratosthenes and considered him a reliable source on the matter.

The second tradition is recorded by Pausanias the geographer. He reported that Eupolis was buried away from Athens, his tomb being located in the vicinity of Sicyon and the river Asopus. Pausanias never explains the reason for a burial away from home. But it might point to Eupolis having a family connection with Sicyon. Storey notes that there was one Athenian family with known connections to this city: the Alcmaeonidae.

The third tradition is recorded by Claudius Aelianus. He first narrates a tale concerning Augeas, a Molossus dog owned by Eupolis, and how it protected the property of its master from a thief. He then mentions that Eupolis eventually died and was buried in Aegina. Augeas maintained a constant vigil and lamented over the grave of its master until dying himself. The location was reportedly named "Dog's Lament" (Ancient Greek: Κυνὸς Θρῆνος) following that event. Modern scholars have pointed out that this account follows a familiar pattern in ancient literary biography of adding in a tale concerning a faithful dog and how its presence benefited its master (the said master invariably being the subject of the biography). Storey suggests that the story may have started as a tale mentioned in a comedy. Then later writers might have mistaken it for a historical account. He finds more intriguing the connection of Eupolis with Aegina. Verses 652–655 of "The Acharnians" imply that Aristophanes was also connected with this island.

The fourth tradition can be found in the Suda. It claims Eupolis was one of the casualties of the Peloponnesian War, dying "in a shipwreck" within the Hellespont (the Dardanelles). The source for the information is not given. Neither is the death associated with any particular naval battle. Storey notes that the death might be connected to any of three major battles in the region: the Battle of Cynossema (411 BC), the Battle of Arginusae (406 BC) or the Battle of Aegospotami (405 BC).

== Reputation ==
Horace listed Eupolis, Cratinus, and Aristophanes (in that order) as the most prominent writers of Old Comedy, noting how they would "single out" the immoral in their comedies. Persius addressed his works to those inspired by "bold Cratinus", "angry Eupolis", and "the grand old man" (Aristophanes). The Saturnalia by Macrobius mentions: "Everyone knows Eupolis, who must be considered among the elegant poets of Old Comedy."

Eupolis combined a lively and fertile imagination with sound practical judgement. He was reputed to equal Aristophanes in the elegance and purity of his diction, and Cratinus in his command of irony and sarcasm.

== Sources ==
- Sommerstein, Alan Herbert (2002), Greek Drama and Dramatists, Routledge, ISBN 0-415-26027-2
- Storey, Ian Christopher (2003), Eupolis: Poet of Old Comedy, Oxford University Press, ISBN 978-0-19-925992-2
- Taplin, Oliver (1994), Comic Angels: And Other Approaches to Greek Drama Through Vase-Paintings, Oxford University Press, ISBN 978-0-19-815000-8
