= Aristophon (comic poet) =

Aristophon (Ancient Greek: Ἀριστοφῶν) was an Athenian comic poet of the Middle Comedy. He was probably victorious at least once at the Lenaia around 350 BCE (IG II2 2325.151).

== Surviving titles and fragments ==
The following eight titles, along with fifteen associated fragments, are all that has survived of Aristophon's work:

- Babias
- Twin Girls, or Pyraunos
- The Physician
- Callonides
- Perithous
- Plato
- The Pythagorean
- Philonides
