= Epicrates of Ambracia =

Ancient Greek poet of Middle Comedy

Epicrates of Ambracia (Greek: Ἐπικράτης Ἀμβρακιώτης), was an Ambraciote who lived in Athens, a comic poet of the Middle Comedy, according to the testimony of Athenaeus (x. p. 422, f.). This is confirmed by extant fragments of his plays, in which he ridicules Plato and his disciples, Speusippus and Menedemus, and in which he refers to the courtesan Lais of Corinth, as being now far advanced in years. (Athen. ii. p. 59, d., xiii. p. 570, b.) From these indications, Augustus Meineke infers that he flourished between the 101st and 108th Olympiads (376–348 BC).

== Surviving titles and fragments ==
Two plays of Epicrates, Emporos (Merchant) and Antilais (Against Lais), are mentioned by Suidas (s. «.), and are quoted by Athenaeus (xiv. p. 655, f., xiii. pp. 570, b., 605, e.), who also quotes his Amazones (x. p. 422, f.) and Dyspratos (Hard to Sell) (vi. p. 262, d.), and informs us that in the latter play Epicrates copied some things from the Dyspratos of Antiphanes. Aelian (N.A.xii. 10) quotes another play by Epicrates titled Choros (Dance).
