= Epinicus =

Athenian comic poet, 3rd century BC

Epinicus or Epinikos (Ancient Greek: Ἐπίνικος, 3rd century BC), was an Athenian comic poet of the New Comedy. Two of his plays are known, Hypoballomenai and Mnêsiptolemos. The latter title determines his date to the time of Antiochus III the Great, about 217 BC, for Mnesiptolemus was an historian in great favour with that king.
