= Cratinus Junior =

4th-century BC Athenian Middle Comedy poet

Cratinus the Younger (4th century BC) was a comic poet of the Middle Comedy, and was a contemporary of Plato and of Corydus. He flourished in the middle of 4th century BC, and as late as 324 BC. Some scholars believe that he even lived into the reign of Ptolemy II Philadelphus.

== Surviving titles and fragments ==
Nine titles of his plays have survived:

- Bouseris ("Busiris")
- Gigantes ("The Giants")
- Theramenes (Theramenes")
- Omphale ("Omphale")
- Pythagorizousa ("Female Pythagorean")
- Tarantinoi ("Men from Tarentum")
- Titanes ("Titans")
- Cheiron ("Chiron")
- Pseudypobolimaios ("The False Changeling")

Many fragments ascribed to the Old Comedy playwright Cratinus were probably by Cratinus the Younger.
