= Autocrates =

5th-century BC Athenian poet and comic playwright

Autocrates (Ancient Greek: Αὐτοκράτης) was an Ancient Athenian poet of the old comedy. One of his plays is mentioned by the Suda and Aelian. He also wrote several tragedies.

The Autocrates quoted by Athenaeus seems to have been a different person.
