= Anaxippus =

Anaxippus (Ancient Greek: Ἀνάξιππος) was an Athenian comic poet of the New Comedy, who was contemporary with Antigonus and Demetrius Poliorcetes, and flourished about 303 BC. We have the titles of four of his plays, and perhaps of one more.
