= Susarion =

Susarion (Greek: Σουσαρίων) was an Archaic Greek comic poet, was a native of Tripodiscus in Megaris (see Megara) and is considered one of the originators of metrical comedy and, by others, he was considered the founder of Attic Comedy. (Note: "The claim from the Megarian side that comedy developed there in the time of their democracy seems to be asserting that comedy in the 'iambic' tradition was a Megarian invention. That claim is matched by, and possibly responsible for, the setting up of a founder of Attic comedy called Susarion, from Icaria (like Thespis, the founder of tragedy), and of a date, duly recorded in the third century Parian chronicle, for the first comic performance (the date fell somewhere between 581 and 560 B.C.: the part of the inscription which gave it is now lost); nor are we astounded to find that Susarion was a Megarian anyway. What core of truth there is in all this will probably be never known".—E.W.Handley, 'Comedy' in Easterling, P.E., (Series Editor), Bernard M.W. Knox (Editor), Cambridge History of Classical Literature, v.I, Greek Literature, 1985. ISBN 0-521-21042-9, cf. Chapter 12, Comedy, p.366-367) Nothing of his work, however, survives except one iambic fragment (see below) and this is not from a comedy but instead seems to belong within the Iambus tradition.

About 580 BC, he transplanted the Megarian comedy (if the rude extempore jests and buffoonery deserve the name) into the Attic deme of Icaria, the cradle also of Greek tragedy and the oldest seat of the worship of Dionysus. According to the Parian Chronicle, there appears to have been a competition on this occasion, in which the prize was a basket of figs and an amphora of wine.

Susarion's improvements in his native farces did not include a separate actor or a regular plot, but probably consisted in substituting metrical compositions for the old extempore effusions of the chorus. These were intended for recitation, and not committed to writing. But such performances did not suit the taste of the Athenians, and nothing more is heard of them until eighty years after the time of Susarion.

Ulrich von Wilamowitz-Moellendorff (in Hermes, ix) considers the so-called Megarian comedy to have been an invention of the Athenians themselves, intended as a satire on Megarian coarseness and vulgarity. The lines attributed to Susarion (in Johann Albrecht Friedrich August Meineke's Poetarum comicorum graecorum fragmenta) are probably not genuine.

== Fragment ==
The following quote, recorded partly by Stobaeus and partly by Tzetzes, is reconstructed here to form the only extant fragment of Susarion's work:

Listen people. These are the words of Susarion, son of Philinus, from Tripodeske in Megara. Women are a bane: but nevertheless it is not possible to live in a household without bane. For to marry or not to marry, either is baneful.
