= Nicophon =

Nicophon (Greek: Νικοφῶν, also Nicophron, Greek: Νικόφρων), the son of a certain Theron, was an Athenian comic poet, a contemporary of Aristophanes in his later years. Athenaeus states that he belonged to Old Comedy, but it is more likely that he belonged to Middle Comedy. We learn from the argument of the Plutus of Aristophanes that he exhibited one of his plays, called Ἄδωνις Adonis, in 388 BC, the date Aristophanes exhibited his Plutus.

== Plays ==
- Ἄδωνις, Adonis
- Ἀφροδίτης γοναί, Origins of Aphrodite
- Ἐξ Ἅδου ἀνιὼν, Coming Up from Hades
- Πανδώρα, Pandora
- Ἐγχειρογαστορες, Living by their Hands
- Σειρῆνες, Sirens

27 lines of his plays have survived.

== Notes ==
- Suidas
- Athenaeus Deipnosophists by Charles Duke Yonge, on the word mystron (spoon), cited by Hippolochus and Nicophon
