= Calliades =

Calliades may refer to:

- Calliades, a comic poet mentioned by Athenaeus (xiii. p. 577) (perhaps a mistake for Callias (comic poet))
- Probable original Greek for the Biblical (Philistine) name Goliath
- Calliades, the name of two artists, a painter spoken of by Lucian (Dial. Meretr. 8, p. 300), and a statuary, who made a statue of the courtezan Naeaira
- Calliades (butterfly), a genus of skipper butterflies
