= Theopompus (comic poet) =

Theopompus (Ancient Greek: Θεόπομπος) was an Athenian poet of the Greek Old Comedy, the son of Theodectus or Theodorus. He produced 24 plays.

== Surviving Titles and Fragments ==
Twenty titles, along with ninety seven associated fragments, are all that survive of Theopompus' work.

- Admetus
- Althea
- Aphrodite
- Batyle
- Peace (Eirene)
- Hedychares
- Theseus
- Callaeschrus
- Barmaids (Kapelides)
- The Mede
- Nemea
- Odysseus
- Children (Paides)
- Pamphile
- Pantaleon
- Penelope
- Sirens
- Female Soldiers (Stratiotides)
- Teisamenus
- Phineus
