= Hermippus =

5th-century BC Athenian poet

Hermippus (Ancient Greek: Ἕρμιππος; fl. 5th century BC) was the one-eyed Athenian writer of the Old Comedy, who flourished during the Peloponnesian War.

== Life ==
He was the son of Lysis, and the brother of the comic poet Myrtilus. He was younger than Telecleides and older than Eupolis and Aristophanes. According to the Suda, he wrote forty plays, and his chief actor was Simeron, according to the scholiast of Aristophanes. The titles and fragments of nine of his plays are preserved. He was a bitter opponent of Pericles, whom he accused (probably in the Moirai) of being a bully and a coward, and of carousing with his boon companions while the Lacedaemonians were invading Attica. He also accused Aspasia of impiety and offences against morality, and her acquittal was only secured by the tears of Pericles (Plutarch, Pericles, 32). In the "Female Bread-Sellers", he attacked the demagogue Hyperbolus. The "Mat-Carriers" contains many parodies of Homer.

== Surviving titles and fragments ==
Ninety-four fragments of Hermippus' work survive, along with the following nine titles:

- Athenas Gonai ("Birth of Athena")
- Artopolides ("Female Bread-Sellers")
- Demotai ("Citizens")
- Europa ("Europa")
- Theoi ("Gods")
- Kerkopes ("Cercopes")
- Moirai ("Fates")
- Stratiotai ("Soldiers")
- Phormophoroi ("Mat-Carriers")

Hermippus also appears to have written scurrilous iambic poems after the manner of Archilochus. Other types of works written by Hermippus cited by ancient writers include trimeters and tetrameters.

== Fragments ==
- Theodor Kock. Comicorum Atticorum fragmenta, i. (1880).
- Augustus Meineke. Poetarum Graecorum comicorum fragmenta, (1855).
- C. Austin and Rudolf Kassel. Poetae Comici Graeci.
