= Telecleides =

5th-century Athenian Old Comedy poet

Telecleides (Ancient Greek: Τηλεκλείδης) was an Athenian Old Comic poet. A contemporary of Cratinus, he was active c. 450 BC – c. 420 BC, and is known to have won at the Dionysia three times and the Lenaia five times. Only eight titles and a few fragments of his plays survive. One of his plays was The Amphictyons, in which Telecleides presented a Golden Age of impossibly effortless plenty. His other known plays include Apseudeis, Hesiodoi, Prytanes, Sterrhoi, and Eumenides.

The standard edition of the fragments is Rudolf Kassel and Colin Austin (eds.), Poetae Comici Graeci.
