= Dionysius Chalcus =

Dionysius Chalcus (Greek: Διονύσιος ὁ Χαλκοῦς) was an ancient Athenian poet and orator. According to Athenaeus, he was called Chalcus ("brazen") because he advised the Athenians to adopt a brass coinage (xv. p. 669). His speeches have not survived, but his poems are referred to and quoted by such authors as Plutarch (Nicias, 5), Aristotle (Rhetoric, iii. 2), and Athenaeus (xv, p. 668, 702; x, p. 443; xiii, p. 602). The extant fragments are chiefly elegies on symposiac subjects and are characterized by extravagant metaphors.

Plutarch credits Dionysius Chalcus with leading the band of Athenian colonists who founded Thurii in 443 BC.

== Sources ==
- Osann, Beiträge z. Griech. u. Röm. Lit. i. p. 79, &c.; Welcker, in the Rhein. Mus. for 1836, p. 440, &c.; Bergk, Poet. Lyr. Graec., p. 432, &c.
- The fragments have been collected and edited by Bruno Gentili and Carlo Prato (Poetae elegiaci testimonia et fragmenta. Pars altera, K.G. Saur, 2002) and by M. L. West (Iambi et elegi Graeci ante Alexandrum cantati, v. 2, Oxford University Press, 1992).
