= Machon =

3rd century BC Greek New Comedy playwright

Machon (Ancient Greek: Μάχων, fl. 3rd century BC) was a playwright of the New Comedy.

He was born in Corinth or Sicyon, and lived in Alexandria. It is said that he taught the grammarian Aristophanes of Byzantium. Two fragments from two of his plays, Agnoia (Ignorance) and Epistole (The Letter), survive, along with 462 verses from a book of anecdotes about the words and deeds of notorious Athenians, preserved in the Deipnosophistae of Athenaeus. Dioscorides wrote an epitaph for Machon that has also survived.
