= Axionicus =

4th century BCE Greek poet

Axionicus (Ancient Greek: Ἀξιόνικος) was an Athenian poet of the Middle Comedy period of Ancient Greek comedy. He lived around the middle of the 4th century BCE.

Some fragments of the following plays have been preserved by Athenaeus:

- The Etruscan (Τυρρηνός or Τυρρηνικός)
- The Euripides Fan (Φιλευριπίδης)
- Philinna (Φίλιννα)
- The Chalcidean (Χαλκιδικός)

The Euripides Fan was a play that dealt with fans' obsessive devotion to the plays of the late Euripides as a kind of mental disorder.

While he has historically been considered an Athenian, modern scholars question whether he was actually an Athenian citizen, though we know he was certainly active in Athens at least.
