= Antidotus =

Antidotus was an ancient Greek painter, mentioned by Pliny the Elder in his Natural History

== Life ==
Antidotus flourished about 336 BC. According to Pliny he was a pupil of Euphranor, and the teacher of Nicias the Athenian. He worked in encaustic.

Pliny says that "Antidotus, as a painter, was more careful in his works than prolific, and his colouring was of a severe style." He mentions three pictures by him in Athens: "a Combatant armed with a shield; a Wrestler, also; and a Trumpeter, a work which has been considered a most exquisite production."

Pliny is the only writer to have mentioned him.

== Sources ==
- Pliny the Elder (1857). The Natural History of Pliny, Volume 6. London: H.G. Bohn. Translation by John Bostock and H.T. Riley.
