= Archedicus =

Archedicus (Ancient Greek: Ἀρχέδικος) was an Athenian comic poet of the New Comedy, who wrote, at the instigation of Timaeus, against Demochares, the nephew of Demosthenes, and supported Antipater and the Macedonian party. The titles of two of his plays are preserved, Διαμαρτάνων and Θησαυρός. He flourished about 302 BCE.
