= Philyllius =

4th-century BC Athenian poet of Middle Comedy

Philyllius (Ancient Greek: Φιλύλλιος), also called Phillylius, Phlaeus, Philolaus, or Phillydeus, was an ancient Athenian comic poet. He was a contemporary of Diocles and Sannyrion. He belonged to the latter part of the Old Comedy tradition and the beginning of the Middle Comedy tradition. He seems to have attained to some distinction before 392 BC, when the Ecclesiazusae of Aristophanes was performed.

All titles of his plays evidently belong to Middle Comedy. He is said to have introduced some scenic innovations, such as bringing lighted torches on the stage. With regard to his language, Augustus Meineke mentions a few words and phrases in his plays, which are not pure Attic.

== List of plays ==
The Suda and Eudocia gave titles of his plays:

- Aigeus
- Auge
- Anteia
- Dodekate ("The Twelfth Woman")
- Herakles ("Hercules")
- Pluntria, or Nausikaa
- Polis ("The City")
- Phreorykhos ("The Well-Digger")
- Atalante
- Helene^{[α]}

== Notes ==
α. The last two titles are suspicious.

== Bibliography ==
- Meineke, Frag. Com. Graec. vol. i. pp. 258–26], ii. pp. 857–866.
- Bergk, Comment, de Reliq. Com. Ait. Ant. p. 428.
