= Alexis (poet) =

4th century BC Athenian comic poet

Alexis (Ancient Greek: Ἄλεξις; fl. 350s – 288 BC) was a Greek comic poet of the Middle Comedy period. He was born in Thurii (in present-day Calabria, Italy) in Magna Graecia and taken early to Athens, where he became a citizen, being enrolled in the deme Oion (Οἶον) and the tribe Leontides. It is thought he lived to the age of 106 and died on the stage while being crowned. According to the Suda, a 10th-century encyclopedia, Alexis was the paternal uncle of the dramatist Menander and wrote 245 comedies, of which only fragments now survive, including some 130 preserved titles.

== Life ==
He appears to have been rather addicted to the pleasures of the table, according to Athenaeus. He had a son named Stephanus (Στέφανος) who was also a comic poet.

He won his first Lenaean victory in the 350s BC, most likely, where he was sixth after Eubulus, and fourth after Antiphanes. While being a Middle Comic poet, Alexis was contemporary with several leading figures of New Comedy, such as Philippides, Philemon, Diphilus, and even Menander. There is also some evidence that, during his old age, he wrote plays in the style of New Comedy.

Plutarch says that he lived to the age of 106 and 5 months, and that he died on the stage while being crowned victor. He was certainly alive after 345 BC, for Aeschines mentions him as alive in that year. He was also living at least as late as 288 BC, from which his birth date is calculated. According to the Suda he wrote 245 comedies, of which only fragments including some 130 titles survive. His plays include Meropis, Ankylion, Olympiodoros, Parasitos (exhibited in 360 BC, in which he ridiculed Plato), Agonis (in which he ridiculed Misgolas), and the Adelphoi and the Stratiotes, in which he satirized Demosthenes, and acted shortly after 343 BC. Also Hippos (316 BC) (in which he referred to the decree of Sophocles against the philosophers), Pyraunos (312 BC), Pharmakopole (306 BC), Hypobolimaios (306 BC), and Ankylion.

Because he wrote a lot of plays, the same passages often appear in more than 3 plays. It was said that he also borrowed from Eubulus and many other playwrights in some of his plays. According to Carytius of Pergamum, Alexis was the first to use the part of the parasite. Alexis was known in Roman times; Aulus Gellius noted that Alexis' poetry was used by Roman comedians, including Turpilius and possibly Plautus.

== Surviving titles and fragments ==
Only fragments have survived from any of Alexis's plays – about 340 in all, totaling about 1,000 lines. They attest to the author's wit and refinement, which Athenaeus praises. The surviving fragments also show that Alexis invented a great many words, mostly compound words, that he used normal words in an unusual way, and made strange and unusual forms of common words. The main sources of the fragments of Alexis are Stobaeus and Athenaeus.

The following 139 titles of Alexis's plays have been preserved:

- Achaiis ("The Achaean Woman")
- Adelphoi ("The Brothers")
- Agonis, or Hippiskos
- Aichmalotos ("The Prisoner of War")
- Aiopoloi ("Goat-Herders")
- Aisopos ("Aesop")
- Aleiptria ("Female Physical Trainer")
- Ampelourgos ("The Vine-Dresser")
- Amphotis
- Ankylion
- Anteia
- Apeglaukomenos
- Apobates ("The Trick Rider")
- Apokoptomenos
- Archilochos
- Asklepiokleides
- Asotodidaskalos ("Teacher of Debauchery")
- Atalante
- Atthis
- Bomos ("The Altar")
- Bostrychos ("Lock of Hair")
- Brettia ("The Bruttian Woman")
- Choregis
- Daktylios ("The Ring")
- Demetrios, or Philetairus
- Diapleousai ("Women Sailing Across The Sea")
- Didymoi ("The Twins")
- Dis Penthon ("Twice Grieving")
- Dorkis, or Poppyzousa ("Lip-Smacking Woman")
- Dropides
- Eis To Phrear ("Into The Well")
- Eisoikizomenos ("The Banished Man")
- Ekkeryttomenos
- Ekpomatopoios ("The Cup-Maker")
- Epidaurios ("The Man From Epidaurus")
- Epikleros ("The Heiress")
- Epistole ("The Letter")
- Epitropos ("The Guardian", or "Protector")
- Eretrikos ("Man From Eretria")
- Erithoi ("Weavers"), or Pannychis ("All-Night Festival")
- Galateia ("Galatea")
- Graphe ("The Document")
- Gynaikokratia ("Government By Women")
- Helene ("Helen")
- Helenes Arpage ("Helen's Capture")
- Helenes Mnesteres ("Helen's Suitors")
- Hellenis ("The Greek Woman")
- Hepta Epi Thebais ("Seven Against Thebes")
- Hesione ("Hesione")
- Hippeis ("Knights")
- Homoia
- Hypnos ("Sleep")
- Hypobolimaios ("The Changeling")
- Iasis ("The Cure, or Remedy")
- Isostasion
- Kalasiris
- Karchedonios ("The Man From Carthage")
- Katapseudomenos ("The False Accuser")
- Kaunioi ("The Men From Kaunos")
- Keryttomenos ("The Proclaimed Man")
- Kitharodos ("The Citharode")
- Kleobouline ("Cleobuline")
- Knidia ("The Woman From Cnidus")
- Koniates ("Plasterer")
- Kouris ("The Lady Hairdresser")
- Krateuas, or Pharmakopoles ("Pharmacist")
- Kybernetes ("The Pilot or Helmsman")
- Kybeutai ("The Dice-Players")
- Kyknos ("The Swan")
- Kyprios ("The Man from Cyprus")
- Lampas ("The Torch")
- Lebes ("The Cauldron")
- Leukadia ("Woman From Leucas"), or Drapetai ("Female Runaways")
- Leuke ("Leprosy," or possibly "The White Poplar")
- Lemnia ("The Woman From Lemnos")
- Linos ("Linus")
- Lokroi ("The Locrians")
- Lykiskos
- Mandragorizomene ("Mandrake-Drugged Woman")
- Manteis ("Diviners," or "Seers")
- Meropis ("Meropis")
- Midon ("Midon")
- Milesia ("Milesian Woman")
- Milkon ("Milcon")
- Minos ("Minos")
- Mylothros ("The Miller")
- Odysseus Aponizomenos ("Odysseus Washing Himself")
- Odysseus Hyphainon ("Odysseus Weaving Cloth")
- Olympiodoros
- Olynthia ("The Woman From Olynthos")
- Opora ("Autumn")
- Orchestris ("The Dancing-Girl")
- Orestes ("Orestes")
- Pallake ("The Concubine")
- Pamphile
- Pankratiastes
- Parasitos ("The Parasite")
- Pezonike
- Phaidon, or Phaidrias
- Phaidros ("Phaedrus")
- Philathenaios ("Lover of the Athenian People")
- Philiskos
- Philokalos, or Nymphai ("Nymphs")
- Philotragodos ("Lover of Tragedies")
- Philousa ("The Loving Woman")
- Phryx ("The Phrygian")
- Phygas ("The Fugitive")
- Poietai ("Poets")
- Poietria ("The Poetess")
- Polykleia ("Polyclea")
- Ponera ("The Wicked Woman")
- Pontikos ("The Man From Pontus")
- Proskedannymenos
- Protochoros ("First Chorus")
- Pseudomenos ("The Lying Man")
- Pylaia
- Pyraunos
- Pythagorizousa ("Female Disciple of Pythagoras")
- Rhodion, or Poppyzousa ("Lip-Smacking Woman")
- Sikyonios ("The Man From Sicyon")
- Skeiron
- Sorakoi
- Spondophoros ("The Libation-Bearer")
- Stratiotes ("The Soldier")
- Synapothneskontes ("Men Dying Together")
- Syntrechontes
- Syntrophoi
- Syrakosios ("Man From Syracuse")
- Tarantinoi ("Men From Tarentum")
- Thebaioi ("Men From Thebes")
- Theophoretos ("Possessed by a God")
- Thesprotoi ("Men From Thesprotia")
- Theteuontes ("Serfs")
- Thrason ("Thrason")
- Titthe ("The Wet-Nurse")
- Tokistes ("Money-Lender"), or Katapseudomenos ("The False Accuser")
- Traumatias ("The Wounded Man")
- Trophonios ("Trophonius")
- Tyndareos ("Tyndareus")

== Editions of fragments ==
- Augustus Meineke. Poetarum Graecorum comicorum fragmenta, (1855).
- Theodor Kock. Comicorum Atticorum fragmenta, i. (1880).
- Colin Austin and Rudolf Kassel. Poetae Comici Graeci. vol. 2.
- W. Geoffrey Arnott (12 September 1996). Alexis: The Fragments: A Commentary. Cambridge University Press. ISBN 978-0-521-55180-9.
