= Theognetus =

3rd century BC Athenian New Comedy poet

Theognetus (Greek: Θεόγνητος) was an Ancient Greek comic poet of the 3rd century BC.

== Works ==
The titles of three of his works survive.

- Κένταυρος (The Centaur)
- Φάσμα ἢ Φιλάργυρος (The Ghost or The Miser)
- Φιλοδέσποτος (The one who loves his master)

Very few fragments of his works survive; this one comes from Athenaeus' Deipnosophistae (3.63).

‘Man, you’re killing me! You are packed full of little speeches

From the Stoa Poikile and you’re sick.

“Wealth is not any man’s possession, it is frost.

Wisdom is truly yours, it is ice, No one ever

Lost wisdom once he found it.” Fuck me!

What kind of a philosopher has god housed me with?

You learned your letters in reverse, wretch.

Your books have turned your life upside down.

You have philosophized nonsense to heaven and earth.

They don’t give a shit about your words.’
