= Phrynichus (comic poet) =

5th-century BC Greek poet of Old Attic comedy

Phrynichus (/ˈfrɪnɪkəs/; Ancient Greek: Φρύνιχος) was a poet of the Old Attic comedy and a contemporary of Aristophanes. His first comedy was exhibited in 429 BC. He composed ten plays, of which the Recluse was exhibited at the City Dionysia in 414 along with the Birds of Aristophanes and gained the third prize. His Muses carried off the second prize at the Lenaia in 405, Aristophanes being first with the Frogs, in which he accuses Phrynichus of employing vulgar tricks to raise a laugh, of plagiarism and bad versification, and of lowbrow politics.

== Surviving titles and fragments ==
The surviving 86 fragments of his work may be found in Theodor Kock, Comicorum atticorum fragmenta (Teubner, 1880).

- Ephialtes ("Ephialtes")
- Konnos
- Kronos ("Cronus")
- Komastai ("Revellers")
- Monotropos ("The Recluse")
- Mousai ("The Muses")
- Mystai ("The Initiated Women")
- Poastriai ("Ladies Who Weed the Fields")
- Satyroi ("The Satyrs")
- Tragodoi ("Tragic Actors"), or Apeleutheroi ("Liberated Slaves")
