= Nicostratus (comic poet) =

Athenian poet of Middle or New Comedy

Nicostratus (Ancient Greek: Νικόστρατος) was a Greek playwright of the Middle Comedy. He was said to be the youngest son of Aristophanes. Photius claims that Nicostratus leaped from the Leucadian Rock due to an unrequited love for a woman named Tettigidaea (Ancient Greek: Τεττιγιδαία, meaning "Cicada-like") from Myrrinous, and thus was "cured" of his love.

== Surviving titles and fragments ==
The following twenty three titles, along with associated fragments, are all that survive of Nicostratus' work:

- Favorite Slave
- Female Love-Rival
- Antyllus
- Man Being Driven Away
- Kings
- The Accuser
- Hecate
- Hesiod
- The Hierophant
- The Bed
- Laconians
- The Cook
- Oenopion
- The Bird-Catcher
- Pandarus
- Pandrosus
- Woman Swimming Alongside
- Citizens
- Wealth
- The Syrian
- The Moneylender
- The Falsely-Branded
- The Bustard-Bird
