= Minor Middle Comedy poets =

Minor authors of Greek Middle Comedy

The following people were all minor authors of Greek Middle Comedy. None of their works have survived intact, but later writers of Late Antiquity provide the titles of some of their plays as well as brief quotations.

== Diocles ==
The following six titles, along with associated fragments, are all that survives of Diocles' (Ancient Greek: Διοκλῆς) work. The Suda states that some accounts claimed that Diocles invented a means of playing music by striking saucers and pottery vessels with a wooden stick.

- The Bacchae
- Bees
- The Cyclopes
- Dreams
- Thalatta (name of a courtesan)
- Thyestes

== Diodorus ==
The following five titles, along with associated fragments, are all that survives of Diodorus' (Ancient Greek: Διόδωρος) work.

- The Corpse
- The Female Flautist
- The Heiress
- The Madman
- People at the Assembly

== Ophelion ==
Kassel-Austin places Ophelion (Ancient Greek: Ὠφελίων) in the Middle Comedy period. The Suda credits him with six plays: Callaeschrus, Centaur, Deucalion, Muses, Recluses, and Satyrs. Athenaeus cites his work four times.

== Philiscus ==
The following eight titles, along with associated fragments, are all that survives of Philiscus' (Ancient Greek: Φιλίσκος) work.

- Adonis
- (The Birth) of Artemis and Apollo
- The Birth of Pan
- The Birth of Hermes and Aphrodite (possibly two separate plays)
- The Birth of Zeus
- Lovers of Money
- Olympus
- Themistocles

== Polyzelus ==
The following six titles, along with associated fragments, are all that survives of Polyzelus' (Ancient Greek: Πολύζηλος) work.

- The Public Tyndareus
- The Birth of Aphrodite
- The Birth of Ares
- The Birth of Dionysus
- The Birth of the Muses
- The Wash Basin

== Sophilus ==
The Suda claims that Sophilus (Ancient Greek: Σώφιλος) was from either Sicyon or Thebes. The following nine titles, along with associated fragments, are all that survives of Sophilus' work.

- Androcles
- The Citharode
- The Deposit
- The Handbook
- Marriage
- The Phylarch
- Those Running Together
- The Woman From Delos
- Tyndareos or Leda

== Sotades of Athens ==
The Suda confuses this playwright with the iambic poet Sotades of Maroneia. Of his work, only the following three titles (along with associated fragments) have come down to us: Charinus, The Ransomed Man, and The Shut-In Women.

== Theophilus ==
The following nine titles, along with associated fragments, are all that survives of Theophilus' (Ancient Greek: Θεόφιλος) work.

- The Citharode
- The Daughters of Proetus
- The Flute-Lover
- The Men From Epidaurus
- Neoptolemus
- The Pancratiast
- The Physician
- Those Traveling Abroad
- Women From Boeotia

== Timotheus of Athens ==
The Suda lists four plays by Timotheus of Athens (Ancient Greek: Τιμόθεος ὁ Ἀθηναῖος): The Boxer, The Changing Man (or The Shifting Man), The Deposit, and The Puppy. Only one four-line quotation of Timotheus' work survives, a quotation from The Puppy by Athenaeus.

== Xenarchus ==
The following eight titles, along with associated fragments, are all that survives of Xenarchus' work.

- Boutalion
- The Pentathlete
- Porphyra (possibly written by Timocles)
- Priapus
- The Scythians
- Sleep
- The Soldier
- The Twins
