= Xenarchus (comic poet) =

Greek comic poet of the Middle Comedy

Xenarchus (Ancient Greek: Ξέναρχος) was a Greek comic poet of the Middle Comedy. None of his plays have survived, but Athenaeus preserves several quotations from his plays in the Deipnosophistae.

== Surviving titles and fragments ==
The following eight titles, along with associated fragments, of Xenarhus' work have lived on:

- Boucolion
- The Pentathlete
- Porphyra
- Priapus
- Scythians
- Sleep
- The Soldier
- Twins
