= Antiphanes (comic poet) =

4th-century BC Greek poet of Middle Comedy

- Ἀντιφάνης
- Born: c. 408 BCE
- Died: 334 BCE (aged c. 74)
- Occupation: Playwright
- Children: Stephanus (also a comic writer)
- Writing career
- Period: Middle Comedy
- Genre: Comedy
- Notable work: 365 comedies (140 titles known)
- Notable awards: 13 victories in dramatic competitions, including 8 at the Lenaea

Antiphanes (Ancient Greek: Ἀντιφάνης; c. 408 to 334 BCE) was a playwright of Middle Comedy. According to Heinz-Günther Nesselrath, he is regarded as one of the most important writers of Middle Comedy alongside Alexis.

Antiphanes was said to have written as many as 365 comedies, and 140 titles of his works are known. His first play was produced about 385 BC. According to the Suda, he won 13 victories in dramatic competitions, including 8 at the Lenaea. In his later career he was a pioneer of the New Comedy. Demetrius of Phalerum and Dorotheus of Ascalon wrote treatises on Antiphanes.

According to the Suda, Antiphanes died after being struck by a pear.

His son, Stephanus, was also a comic writer.

== Surviving titles and fragments ==
- Adelphai ("Sisters")
- Adonis
- Agroikos ("The Country-Dweller")
- Akestria
- Akontizomene ("Woman Shot With an Arrow")
- Aleiptria ("The Female Oiler, or Masseuse")
- Alkestis ("Alcestis")
- Antaios ("Antaeus")
- Anteia
- Anasozomenoi ("The Rescued Men")
- Aphrodites Gonai ("The Birth of Aphrodite")
- Archestrate
- Archon
- Argyriou Aphanismos ("Disappearance of Money")
- Arkas ("Man from Arcadia")
- Arpazomene ("The Seized, or Captured, Woman")
- Asklepios ("Asclepius")
- Asotoi ("Debauched Men")
- Auletes ("Male Flute-Player")
- Auletris ("Female Flute-Player"), or Didymai ("Twin Sisters")
- Autou Eron
- Bakchai ("Bacchae")
- Batalos
- Boiotis ("The Woman From Boeotia")
- Bombylios
- Bousiris ("Busiris")
- Boutalion
- Byzantios ("The Man From Byzantium")
- Cyclops
- Chrysis
- Gamos ("Marriage")
- Ganymedes ("Ganymede")
- Glaukos ("Glaucus")
- Gorgythos
- Diplasia ("Female Double")
- Dodonis ("The Woman From Dodona")
- Drapetagogos ("Catcher of Runaway Slaves")
- Dyserotes ("People With Disastrous Love-Lives")
- Dyspratos ("The Hard-To-Sell Slave")
- Ephesia ("The Woman From Ephesus")
- Epidaurios ("The Man From Epidaurus")
- Epikleros ("The Heiress")
- Euploia ("A Pleasant Voyage")
- Euthydikos
- Halieuomene ("Woman Caught Like A Fish")
- Heniochos ("The Charioteer")
- Hippeis ("Knights")
- Homoioi ("People Who Resemble Each Other")
- Homonymoi ("People With The Same Name")
- Homopatrioi ("People With The Same Father")
- Hydria ("The Water-Pitcher")
- Hypnos ("Sleep")
- Iatros ("The Physician")
- Kaineus ("Caeneus")
- Kares ("Men From Caria")
- Karine ("The Woman From Caria")
- Kepouros ("The Gardener")
- Kitharistes ("The Harpist")
- Kitharodos ("The Citharode")
- Kleophanes
- Knapheus ("The Fuller")
- Knoithideus, or Gastron ("Glutton")
- Korinthia ("The Woman From Corinth")
- Koroplathos ("Modeller of Clay Figures")
- Korykos
- Kouris ("The Female Hair-Dresser")
- Kybeutai ("Dice-Players")
- Lampas ("The Torch")
- Lampon
- Lemniai ("Women From Lemnos")
- Leonides
- Leptiniskos
- Leukadios ("The Man From Leucas")
- Lydos ("The Man From Lydia")
- Medeia ("Medea")
- Melanion
- Meleagros ("Meleager")
- Melitta ("The Bee")
- Metoikos ("Resident Alien")
- Metragyrtes ("Beggar-Priest of Cybele")
- Metrophon
- Midon
- Minos ("Minos")
- Misoponeros ("Hater of Wickedness")
- Mnemata ("The Tombs")
- Moichoi ("Adulterers")
- Mylon ("The Mill")
- Mystis ("Woman Initiated Into the Mysteries")
- Obrimos
- Oinomaos, or Pelops
- Oionistes ("The Omen-Reader")
- Omphale ("Omphale")
- Orpheus ("Orpheus")
- Paiderastes ("The Pederast")
- Parasitos ("The Parasite")
- Paroimiai ("Proverbs")
- Phaon ("Phaon")
- Philetairos ("Philetaerus")
- Philoktetes ("Philoctetes")
- Philometor ("Mother-Lover")
- Philopator ("Father-Lover")
- Philotis
- Phrearrhios
- Plousioi ("Rich Men")
- Poiesis ("Poetry")
- Pontikos ("Man From Pontus")
- Probateus ("The Sheep-Rancher")
- Problema ("Problem," or "Riddle")
- Progonoi ("Ancestors")
- Pyraunos
- Sappho
- Skleriai ("Difficulties," or "Hardships")
- Skythai ("Scythians"), or Tauroi ("Bulls")
- Stratiotes ("The Soldier"), or Tychon
- Thamyras
- Theogony
- Timon
- Traumatias ("The Wounded Man")
- Tritagonistes
- Tyrrhenus
- Zakynthios ("The Man From Zakynthos")
- Zographos ("The Painter")
