= Rudolf Kassel =

German classical philologist (1926–2020)

Rudolf Kassel (11 May 1926 – 26 February 2020) was a German classical philologist. He was a professor at the Free University of Berlin from 1963 to 1975 and subsequently the University of Cologne from 1975 until his retirement in 1991.

== Career ==
Kassel was born on 11 May 1926 in Frankenthal. In 1951 he obtained his doctorate at the University of Mainz. In 1956 Kassel obtained his habilitation at the University of Würzburg with a thesis on Greek and Roman consolation literature. At the University of Würzburg he also worked as a private teacher. In 1962 Kassel moved to the United Kingdom where he was Nellie Wallace Lecturer at the University of Oxford. One year later he returned to Germany and was appointed professor at the Free University of Berlin. In 1975 Kassel moved to the University of Cologne where he became professor of Ancient Greek philology at the Institut für Altertumskunde. He retired in 1991. Kassel died on 26 February 2020, aged 93.

Amongst his academic output Kassel published work on Poetics and Rhetoric by Aristotle, Ancient Greek comedy and Menander. Together with Colin François Lloyd Austin he published an edition of the fragments of ancient Greek comedy in eight volumes under the title Poetae Comici Graeci. He was considered an expert on papyrology and epigraphy and served as co-editor of the Zeitschrift für Papyrologie und Epigraphik.

== Honours and awards ==
Kassel was elected a Corresponding Fellow of the British Academy in 1973. He became a member of the North Rhine-Westphalian Academy of Sciences, Humanities and the Arts in 1977. He was elected foreign member of the Royal Netherlands Academy of Arts and Sciences in 1991. Kassel was elected corresponding member of the Academy of Athens in 1993. In 2003 he received the Commander's Cross of the Order of Merit of the Federal Republic of Germany. Kassel was an honorary member of the Society for the Promotion of Hellenic Studies and received honorary doctorates from the University of Oxford and the Aristotle University of Thessaloniki.
