= Plutus (play) =

Comedy by Aristophanes

- Written by: Aristophanes
- Chorus: Rustics
- Characters: Chremylos; Cario(n); Plutus; Penia; Hermes
- Mute: mutual
- Original language: Ancient Greek
- Genre: Ancient Greek comedy; Political satire
- Setting: Classical Athens

Premiere
- Date premiered: 388 BC

Plutus (Ancient Greek: Πλοῦτος, Ploutos, "Wealth") is an Ancient Greek comedy by the playwright Aristophanes, which was first produced in 388 BC. A political satire on contemporary Athens, it features the personified god of wealth Plutus. Reflecting the development of Old Comedy towards New Comedy, it uses such familiar character types as the stupid master and the insubordinate slave to attack the morals of the time.

== Plot ==
The play features an elderly Athenian citizen, Chremylos, and his slave Cario or Carion. Chremylos presents himself and his family as virtuous but poor, and has accordingly gone to seek advice from an oracle. The play begins as he returns to Athens from Delphi, having been instructed by Apollo to follow the first man he meets and persuade him to come home with him. That man turns out to be the god Plutus — who is, contrary to all expectations, a blind beggar. After much argument, Plutus is convinced to enter Chremylos's house, where he will have his vision restored, meaning that "wealth" will now go only to those who deserve it in one way or another.

The first part of the play examines the idea that wealth is not distributed to the virtuous, or necessarily to the non-virtuous, but instead it is distributed randomly. Chremylos is convinced that if Plutus's eyesight can be restored, these wrongs can be righted, making the world a better place.

The second part introduces the goddess Penia (Poverty). She counters Chremylos's arguments that it is better to be rich by arguing that without poverty there would be no slaves (as every slave would buy his freedom) and no fine goods or luxury foods (as nobody would work if everyone were rich).

After Plutus's eyesight is restored at the Temple of Asclepius, he formally becomes a member of Chremylos's household. At the same time, the entire world is turned upside-down economically and socially. Unsurprisingly, this gives rise to rancorous comments and claims of unfairness from those who have been deprived of their riches.

In the end, the messenger god Hermes arrives to inform Chremylos and his family of the gods' anger. As in Aristophanes's The Birds, the gods have been starved of sacrifices, since human beings have all directed their attention to Plutus, and they no longer pay homage to the traditional Olympian gods. Hermes, worried about his own predicament, actually offers to work for the mortals and enters Chremylos's house as a servant on those conditions.

== Performance history ==
Plutus was the last performance of Aristophanes that occurred during his lifetime. Plutus was also one of the first Greek plays to be performed using the new (post-Reformation) pronunciation of Greek diphthongs developed by John Cheke and Thomas Smith during the 1530s, when it was enacted at St John's College, Cambridge.

== Translations ==
The first page of Il Plvto d'Aristofane, comedia prima (1545), an Italian translation by Bartolomio & Pietro Rositini

- William James Hickie, 1853, prose, The Comedies of Aristophanes, Vol. 2
- William Charles Green, 1892 (2nd ed), verse, full text
- Benjamin B. Rogers, 1924, verse, available for digital loan
- Arthur S. Way, 1934, verse, Aristophanes in English Verse, Volume 2. London: Macmillan and Co.
- Eugene O'Neill Jr., 1938, prose, full text
- Alan H. Sommerstein, 1978, available for digital loan
- Jeffrey Henderson, 2002, verse
- George Theodoridis, 2008, prose, full text
