= Georg Kaibel =

German classical philologist (1849–1901)

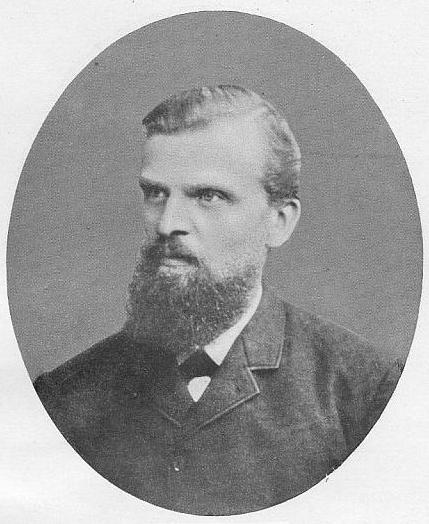
Georg Kaibel (1849-1901)

Georg Kaibel (30 October 1849 – 12 October 1901) was a German classical philologist born in Lübeck. He was a leading authority of Greek epigraphy and epigrammatics.

== Biography ==
Kaibel studied classical philology at the universities of Göttingen and Bonn. At Bonn he was a pupil of Hermann Usener and Franz Bücheler. In 1872–74 he was a member of the German Archaeological Institute in Rome, where he became a close associate of Theodor Mommsen and Ulrich von Wilamowitz-Moellendorff. Afterwards, he taught classes in Elberfeld and at the Askanische Oberschule in Berlin.

In 1879 he became an associate professor of classical philology at the University of Breslau, followed by professorships at Rostock (1882), Greifswald (1883) and Strasbourg (1886). In 1897 he returned to Göttingen, where he was elected a full member of the Göttingen Academy of Sciences.

Kaibel published several editions of works from the Second Sophistic era, as well as highly regarded editions of Sophocles' Electra and Antigone. He was editor of the journal Hermes (1882 to 1901), and contributed numerous articles on Greek comedy to the first four volumes of Georg Wissowa's Realencyclopädie der Classischen Altertumswissenschaft (1894–1901).

He died in Göttingen.

== Selected publications ==
- Kaibel, Georg, ed. (1878). Epigrammata Graeca ex lapidibus conlecta. Berlin: Reimer.
- Kaibel, Georg (1879). "Supplementum epigrammatum Graecorum ex lapidibus conlectorum". Rheinisches Museum für Philologie. 34: 181–213.
- Kaibel, Georg (1883). Stil und Text der ΠΟΛΙΤΕΙΑ ΑΘΗΝΑΙΩN des Aristoteles. Berlin: Weidmann.
- Athenaeus (1887). Kaibel, Georg (ed.). Dipnosophistae. Vol. I: Libri I–V. Leipzig: Teubner.
- Athenaeus (1887). Kaibel, Georg (ed.). Dipnosophistae. Vol. II: Libri VI–X. Leipzig: Teubner.
- Kaibel, Georg, ed. (1889). Poetarum Comicorum Fragmenta. Poetarum Graecorum Fragmenta, VI, 1, 1. Berlin: Weidmann.
- Athenaeus (1890). Kaibel, Georg (ed.). Dipnosophistae. Vol. III: Libri XI–XV • Indices. Leipzig: Teubner.
- Kaibel, Georg, ed. (1890). Inscriptiones Siciliae et Italiae. Inscriptiones Graecae, XIV. Leipzig: Reimer.
- Galenus (1894). Kaibel, Georg (ed.). Protreptici quae supersunt. Leipzig: Teubner.
- Kaibel, Georg (1895). "Dionysios von Halikarnass und sie Sophistik". Hermes. 20 (4): 497–513.
- Kaibel, Georg (1897). De Sophoclis Antigona. Göttingen: Kaestner.
- Kaibel, Georg; Wilamowitz-Moellendorff, Ulrich (von), eds. (1897). ΠΟΛΙΤΕΙΑ ΑΘΗΝΑΙΩΝ (3rd ed.). Berlin: Weidmann.
- Sophocles (1899). Kaibel, Georg (ed.). Elektra. Berlin – Leipzig: Teubner.
- Kaibel, Georg (1899). De Phrynicho sophista. Göttingen: Kaestner.
- Kaibel, Georg (1899). "Cassius Longinus und die Schrift ΠΕΡΙ ΥΨΟΥΣ". Hermes. 34 (1): 107–112.
