= Old Comedy =

Earliest period of ancient Greek comedic drama

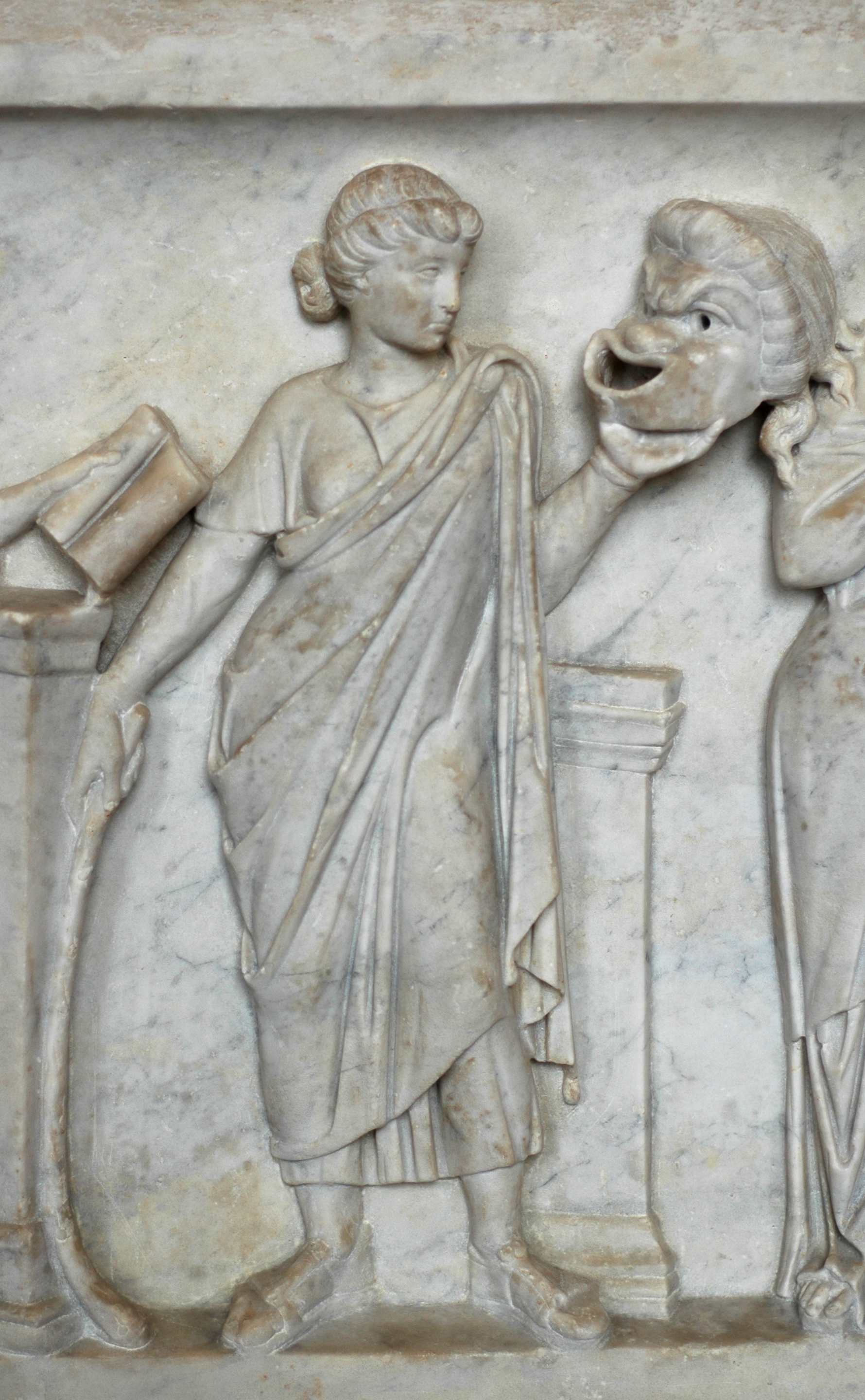
Thalia, muse of comedy, gazing upon a comic mask (detail from Muses' Sarcophagus)

Old Comedy is the first period of the ancient Greek comedy, according to the canonical division by the Alexandrian grammarians. The most important Old Comic playwright is Aristophanes – whose works, with their daring political commentary and abundance of sexual innuendo, de facto define the genre. The only extant plays of Old Comedy are credited to Aristophanes. There are only fragments and 'testimonia' of all other Old Comedy playwrights and plays.

== Origins and history ==
The word "comedy" (Ancient Greek: κωμῳδία, kōmōidía) derives from the words for 'revel' and 'song' (κῶμος, kōmos, and ᾠδή, ōidē) and according to Aristotle comic drama actually developed from song. The first official comedy at the City Dionysia was not staged until 487/6 BCE, by which time tragedy had already been long established there. The first comedy at the Lenaia was staged later still, only about 20 years before the performance there of The Acharnians, the first of Aristophanes' surviving plays. According to Aristotle, comedy was slow to gain official acceptance because nobody took it seriously, yet only 60 years after comedy first appeared at the City Dionysia, Aristophanes observed that producing comedies was the most difficult work of all. Competition at the Dionysian festivals needed dramatic conventions for plays to be judged, but it also fuelled innovations. Developments were quite rapid and Aristotle could distinguish between 'old' and 'new' comedy by 330 BCE.

The origins of the Old Comedy were traced by Aristotle to the komos or celebratory festival processions of ancient Greece, and the phallic songs that accompanied them. Although the earliest Athenian comedy, from the 480s to 440s BCE, is almost entirely lost, it is clear that comedy had already crystallised into a highly structured form, with the chorus playing a central role. The most important poets of the period were Magnes, whose work survives only in a few fragments of dubious authenticity, and Cratinus, who took the prize at the City Dionysia probably sometime around 450 BCE. Although no complete plays by Cratinus are preserved, they are known through hundreds of fragments: he was noted in antiquity both for a mastery of plot and for the obscene vehemence of his attacks on Pericles.

== Aristophanes and his contemporaries ==
Aristophanes satirized and lampooned the most prominent personalities and institutions of his time, as can be seen, for example, in his scurrilous portrayal of Socrates in The Clouds, and in his racy anti-war farce Lysistrata. Aristophanes was only one of a large number of comic poets, however, working in Athens in the late 5th century BCE; his biggest rivals were Hermippus and Eupolis. Classical literary criticism placed Aristophanes somewhere between the harshness of Cratinus and the smoothness of Eupolis.

All the Old Comedy writers worked within a highly structured format – parodos, agon, and parabasis – which paradoxically offered maximum scope for improvisatory flights of fancy. Song, dance, costume, and chorus all played important roles, as did the parody of the ‘senior’ drama, tragedy. Possibly due to the influence of tragedy was the important role of a heroic figure in Aristophanic comedy: as Northrop Frye put it, “In Aristophanes there is usually a central figure who constructs his (or her) own society in the teeth of strong opposition”. The diminished role of the protagonist (and chorus) in his latest works marks a point of transition to the Middle comedy.

The trend from Old Comedy to New Comedy saw a move away from highly topical concerns with real individuals and local issues towards generalized situations and stock characters. This was partly due to the internationalization of cultural perspectives during and after the Peloponnesian War. For ancient commentators such as Plutarch and Aristotle, New Comedy was a more sophisticated form of drama than Old Comedy. However, Old Comedy was in fact a complex and sophisticated dramatic form incorporating many approaches to humour and entertainment. In Aristophanes' early plays, the genre appears to have developed around a complex set of dramatic conventions, and these were only gradually simplified and abandoned.

The City Dionysia and the Lenaia were celebrated in honour of Dionysus, the god of wine and ecstasy. (Euripides' play The Bacchae offers the best insight into fifth century ideas about this god.) Old Comedy can be understood as a celebration of the exuberant sense of release inherent in his worship. It was more interested in finding targets for satire than in any kind of advocacy. During the City Dionysia, a statue of the god was brought to the theatre from a temple outside the city, and it remained in the theatre throughout the festival, overseeing the plays like a privileged member of the audience. In The Frogs, the god appears also as a dramatic character, and he enters the theatre ludicrously disguised as Hercules. He observes to the audience that every time he is on hand to hear a joke from a comic dramatist like Phrynichus (one of Aristophanes' rivals) he ages by more than a year. This scene opens the play, and it is a reminder to the audience that nobody is above mockery in Old Comedy—not even its patron god and its practitioners. Gods, artists, politicians and ordinary citizens were legitimate targets; comedy was a kind of licensed buffoonery, and there was no legal redress for anyone who was slandered in a play. There were certain limits to the scope of the satire, but they are not easily defined. Impiety could be punished in fifth century Athens, but the absurdities implicit in the traditional religion were open to ridicule. The polis was not allowed to be slandered, but as stated in the biography section of this article, that could depend on who was in the audience and which festival was involved.

For convenience, Old Comedy, as represented by Aristophanes' early plays, is analysed below in terms of three broad characteristics—topicality, festivity and complexity. Dramatic structure contributes to the complexity of Aristophanes' plays. However, it is associated with poetic rhythms and meters that have little relevance to English translations and it is therefore treated in a separate section.

== Topicality ==
Old Comedy's emphasis on real personalities and local issues makes the plays difficult to appreciate today without the aid of scholarly commentaries—see for example articles on The Knights, The Wasps and Peace for lists of topical references. The topicality of the plays had unique consequences for both the writing and the production of the plays in ancient Athens.

- Individual masks: All actors in classical Athens wore masks, but whereas in tragedy and New Comedy these identified stereotypical characters, in Old Comedy the masks were often caricatures of real people. Perhaps Socrates attracted a lot of attention in Old Comedy because his face lent itself easily to caricature by mask-makers. In The Knights we are told that the mask makers were too afraid to make a caricature of Cleon (there represented as a Paphlagonian slave) but we are assured that the audience is clever enough to identify him anyway.
- The real scene of action: Since Old Comedy makes numerous references to people in the audience, the theatre itself was the real scene of action and theatrical illusion was treated as something of a joke. In The Acharnians, for example, the Pnyx is just a few steps from the hero's front door, and in Peace Olympus is separated from Athens by a few moments' supposed flight on a dung beetle. The audience is sometimes drawn or even dragged into the action. When the hero in Peace returns to Athens from his flight to Olympus, he tells the audience that they looked like rascals when seen from the heavens, and seen up close they look even worse. In The Acharnians the hero confronts the archon basileus, sitting in the front row, and demands to be awarded first prize for a drinking competition, which is a none too subtle way for Aristophanes to request first prize for the drama competition.
- Self-mocking theatre: Frequent parodying of tragedy is an aspect of Old Comedy that modern audiences find difficult to understand. But the Lenaia and City Dionysia included performances of both comedies and tragedies, and thus references to tragedy were highly topical and immediately relevant to the original audience. The comic dramatist also poked fun at comic poets and he even ridiculed himself. It is possible, as indicated earlier, that Aristophanes mocked his own baldness. In The Clouds, the Chorus compares him to an unwed, young mother and in The Acharnians the Chorus mockingly depicts him as Athens' greatest weapon in the war against Sparta.
- Political theatre: The Lenaia and City Dionysia were state-sponsored, religious festivals, and though the latter was the more prestigious of the two, both were occasions for official pomp and circumstance. The ceremonies for the Lenaia were overseen by the archon basileus and by officials of the Eleusinian Mysteries. The City Dionysia was overseen by the archon eponymos and the priest of Dionysus. Opening ceremonies for the City Dionysia featured, in addition to the ceremonial arrival of the god, a parade in full armour of the sons of warriors who died fighting for the polis and, until the end of the Peloponnesian War, a presentation of annual tribute from subject states. Religious and political issues were topics that could hardly be ignored in such a setting and the plays often treat them quite seriously. Even jokes can be serious when the topic is politics—especially in wartime. The butts of the most savage jokes are opportunists who prey on the gullibility of their fellow citizens, including oracle-mongers, the exponents of new religious practices, war-profiteers and political fanatics. In The Acharnians, for example, Lamachus is represented as a crazed militarist whose preparations for war are hilariously compared to the hero's preparations for a dinner party. Cleon emerges from numerous similes and metaphors in The Knights as a protean form of comic evil, clinging to political power by every possible means for as long as he can, yet the play also includes simple hymns invoking Poseidon and Athena, and it ends with visions of a miraculously transformed Demos (i.e. the morally reformed citizenry of Athens). Imaginative visions of a return to peaceful activities resulting from peace with Sparta, and a plea for leniency for citizens suspected of complicity in an oligarchic revolt are other examples of a serious purpose behind the plays.
- Teasing and taunting: A festival audience presented the comic dramatist with a wide range of targets, not just political or religious ones—anyone known to the audience could be mocked for any reason, such as diseases, physical deformities, ugliness, family misfortunes, bad manners, perversions, dishonesty, cowardice in battle, and clumsiness. Foreigners, a conspicuous presence in imperial Athens, particularly at the City Dionysia, often appear in the plays comically mispronouncing Attic words—these include Spartans (Lysistrata), Scythians (Thesmophoriazusae), Persians, Boeotians and Megarians (The Acharnians).

== Festivity ==
The Lenaia and City Dionysia were religious festivals, but they resembled a gala rather than a church service.

- Dirty jokes: A relaxation in standards of behaviour was permitted and the holiday spirit included bawdy irreverence towards both men and gods. Old Comedy is rich in obscenities and the crude jokes are often very detailed and difficult to understand without expert commentary, as when the Chorus in The Acharnians places a curse on Antimachus, a choregus accused of parsimonious conduct, wishing upon him a night-time mugging as he returns home from some drunken party and envisioning him, as he stoops down to pick up a rock in the darkness, accidentally picking up a fresh turd instead. He is then envisioned hurling the turd at his attacker, missing and accidentally hitting Cratinus, a lyric poet not admired by Aristophanes. This was particularly funny because the curse was sung (or chanted) in choreographed style by a Chorus of 24 grown men who were otherwise known to the audience as respectable citizens.
- The musical extravaganza: The Chorus was vital to the success of a play in Old Comedy long after it had lost its relevance for tragedy. Technically, the competition in the dramatic festivals was not between poets but between choruses. In fact eight of Aristophanes' eleven surviving plays are named after the Chorus. In Aristophanes' time, the Chorus in tragedy was relatively small (twelve members) and its role had been reduced to that of an awkwardly placed commentator, but in Old Comedy the Chorus was large (numbering 24), it was actively involved in the plot, its entry into the action was frequently spectacular, its movements were practised with military precision and sometimes it was involved in choreographed skirmishes with the actors. The expenditure on costumes, training and maintenance of a Chorus was considerable, and perhaps many people in the original audience enjoyed comedy mainly for the spectacle and music. The chorus gradually lost its significance as New Comedy began to develop.
- Obvious costumes: Consistent with the holiday spirit, much of the humour in Old Comedy is slapstick buffoonery and dirty jokes that do not require the audience's careful attention, often relying on visual cues. Actors playing male roles appear to have worn tights over grotesque padding, with a prodigious, leather phallus barely concealed by a short tunic. Female characters were played by men but were easily recognized in long, saffron tunics. Sometimes the visual cues are deliberately confused for comic effect, as in The Frogs, where Dionysus arrives on stage in a saffron tunic, the buskin boots of a tragic actor and a lion skin cloak that usually characterized Heracles—an absurd outfit that provokes the character Heracles (as no doubt it provoked the audience) to guffaws of helpless mirth.
- The farcical anti-climax: The holiday spirit might also have been responsible for an aspect of the comic plot that can seem bewildering to modern audiences. The major confrontation (agon) between the 'good' and 'bad' characters in a play is often resolved decisively in favour of the former long before the end of the play. The rest of the play deals with farcical consequences in a succession of loosely connected scenes. The farcical anti-climax has been explained in a variety of ways, depending on the particular play. In The Wasps, for instance, it has been thought to indicate a gradual change in the main character's perspective as the lessons of the agon are slowly absorbed. In The Acharnians, it has been explained in terms of a unifying theme that underlies the episodes, demonstrating the practical benefits that come with wisdom. But the early release of dramatic tension is consistent with the holiday meanings in Old Comedy and it allows the audience to relax in uncomplicated enjoyment of the spectacle, the music, jokes and celebrations that characterize the remainder of the play. The celebration of the hero's victory often concludes in a sexual conquest and sometimes it takes the form of a wedding, thus providing the action with a joyous sense of closure.

== Later influence/parallels ==
Horace claimed a formative role for the Old Comedy in the making of Roman satire.

The Old Comedy subsequently influenced later European writers such as Ben Jonson, Racine, and Goethe. Also, François Rabelais, Miguel de Cervantes, Jonathan Swift, and Voltaire may have derived elements from it. Western writers took particular inspiration from Aristophanes' disguising of political attacks as buffoonery. Old Comedy displays similarities to modern-day political satires such as Dr. Strangelove (1964) and the televised buffoonery of Monty Python and Saturday Night Live.

George Bernard Shaw was profoundly influenced by Aristophanian comedy-writing. According to Robert R. Speckhard, "like Shaw, Aristophanes wrote comedies of ideas, and, though one finds no evidence that Shaw is indebted to Aristophanes, it is clear that in facing much the same dramatic problem that Aristophanes faced, Shaw came up with much the same solution. Because the comic machinery is easier to spot in Aristophanes (where there is no attempt, as in Shaw, to disguise it with any surface realism), what Aristophanes has done becomes a helpful point of reference from which to study what Shaw has done."

== See also ==
- Comic opera
- Crates (comic poet)
- Onomasti komodein
