= Lenaia =

Festival of Dionysus in Athens

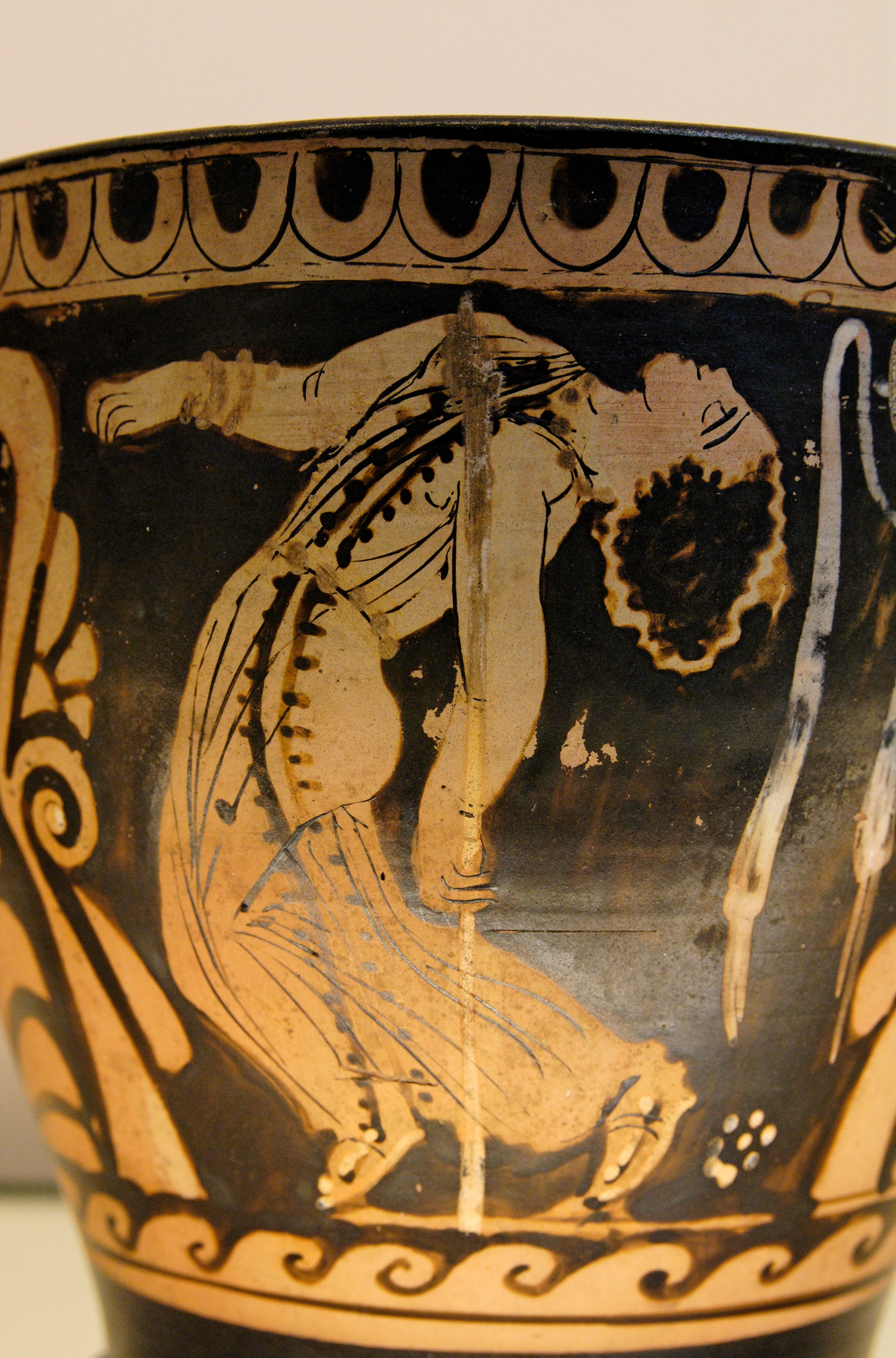
Paestan red-figure skyphos, ca. 330-320 BC.

The Lenaia (Ancient Greek: Λήναια) was an annual Athenian festival with a dramatic competition. It was one of the lesser festivals of Athens and Ionia in ancient Greece. The Lenaia took place in Athens in Gamelion, roughly corresponding to January. The festival was in honour of Dionysus Lenaios. There is also evidence the festival also took place in Delphi.

The term Lenaia probably comes from "lenos" 'wine-press' or from "lenai", another name for the Maenads (the female worshippers of Dionysus).

== Overview ==
The Lenaia is depicted on numerous vases, which show both typical Maenad scenes and those of aristocrats and wine-mixing rituals. It is unknown exactly what kind of worship occurred at the festival, but it may have been in honor of Dionysus as a youth or the rebirth of Dionysus after his murder by the Titans. It may have also had some connection with the Eleusinian Mysteries, as some of the same religious officials were involved (such as the Archon basileus and the epimeletai). These officials led the procession (πομπή pompe), which probably ended with a sacrifice. The references we have mention a procession and ἀγών held ‘by torchlight,’ where an Eleusian official, originating in Athens, called upon or invoked Dionysus. Then, the chorus would respond ‘Iacchos, son of Semele, Πλουτοδότης.’ Most of all, the festival appears to be an agrarian one. It was celebrated at a crucial time for propitiating the awakening of nature. Specifically, the grape and wine, symbolised by the god himself, his death and reemergence from the underworld. Though, this was not the time of the grape harvest, but rather when the vines were pruned.

The festival may have had rites for women. The coincidence of invoking Iacchus, seen as Dionysus as a child, by torchlight and commemorating the myth of the god's death and rebirth. This happened both in Delphi and in Athens in the Lenaia, in the same season, winter. It further supports the idea that Attic Lenaia had a specific ritual involving women, the followers of the god. The ritual associated in this case with the idea of the resurrection of the god associated with wine production and the wine press. Though, whether or not it was a festival for women, or that festival heavily involved them, is still a debate. In Athens, there was no mention of a women's festival. However, that could be due to that women are associated with Dionysus's secret and sacred rites, which wouldn't normally be talked about or made public.

Athenian woman probably participated in the nocturnal rites. They may have played an important role in ‘calling’ or invoking the god. But, they were not the main focus and are not even mentioned in the texts. However, women are depicted on Attic vases as being close to the process of wine production along with the unmixed wine. Along with that, the satyrs of untamed nature are also found, along with the god himself.

In Athens, the festival was originally held in the Lenaion (possibly a theatre outside the city or a section of the Agora) but probably moved to the Theatre of Dionysus by the mid-fifth century. Beginning in the second half of the 5th century BC, plays were performed (as they were at the City Dionysia festival later in the year). The audiences for the Lenaia were usually limited to the local population, since travel by sea at that time of year was considered unsafe. Metics, however, were apparently allowed to both participate and act as choregoi. Around 442 BC, new comic contests were officially included in the Lenaia, though plays may have been performed there earlier on an informal basis. At first, the festival held dramatic competitions only for comedy, but in 432 BC a tragic contest was introduced. Many of Aristophanes' plays were first performed there, such as 'Knights'. As with the competition at the City Dionysia, five comedies usually competed (except during the Peloponnesian War when only three were staged). When the contest for tragedy was introduced, two tragedians competed, each presenting two plays. There is no evidence of satyr plays being performed, but dithyrambs were included in the third century BC. Towards the end of the century, the festival's plays were performed in the Theatre of Dionysus (although it is unclear when this location was first used). It is unknown when the Lenaia was abandoned, but contests of some sort continued into the 2nd century BC.

== See also ==
- Anthesteria and Bacchanalia
- Dionysia
- Lenaeus (disambiguation)
- Satyr

== Sources ==
- Brockett, Oscar G. and Franklin J. Hildy. 2003. History of the Theatre. Ninth edition, International edition. Boston: Allyn and Bacon. ISBN 0-205-41050-2.
- Pickard-Cambridge, Sir Arthur. 1953. The Dramatic Festivals of Athens. 2nd ed. Oxford: Clarendon P, 1968. ISBN 0-19-814258-7
