= Greek tragedy =

Form of theatre from Ancient Greece

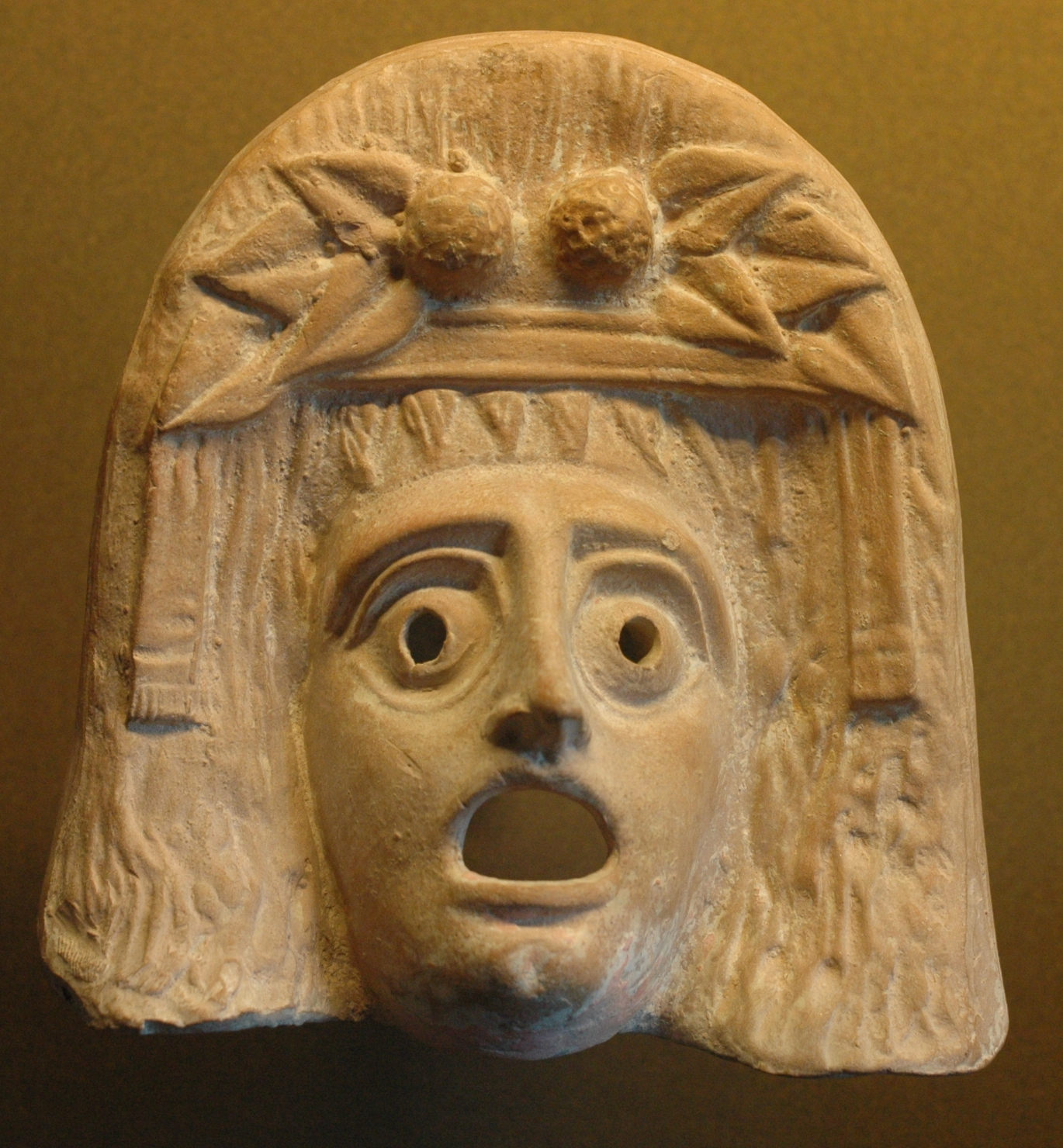
Mask of Dionysus found at Myrina (Aeolis) of ancient Greece c. 200 BC – 1 BC, now at the Louvre

Greek tragedy (Ancient Greek: τραγῳδία, romanized: tragōidía) is one of the three principal theatrical genres from Ancient Greece and Greek-inhabited Anatolia, along with comedy and the satyr play. It reached its most significant form in Athens in the 5th century BC, the works of which are sometimes called Attic tragedy.

Greek tragedy is widely believed to be an extension of the ancient rites carried out in honor of Dionysus, the god of wine and theatre, and it greatly influenced the theatre of Ancient Rome and the Renaissance. Tragic plots were most often based upon myths from the oral traditions of archaic epics. In tragic theatre, however, these narratives were presented by actors. The most acclaimed Greek tragedians are Aeschylus, Sophocles, and Euripides. These tragedians often explored many themes of human nature, mainly as a way of connecting with the audience but also as way of bringing the audience into the play.

== Etymology ==
=== Aristotelian hypothesis ===
The origin of the word tragedy has been a matter of discussion from ancient times. The primary source of knowledge on the question is the Poetics of Aristotle. Aristotle was able to gather first-hand documentation from theater performance in Attica, which is inaccessible to scholars today. His work is therefore invaluable for the study of ancient tragedy, even if his testimony is open to doubt on some points.

According to Aristotle, tragedy evolved from the satyr dithyramb, an Ancient Greek hymn, which was sung along with dancing in honor of Dionysus. The term τραγῳδία ['tragodía'], derived from τράγος ['trágos'] "goat" and ᾠδή ['odí'] "song", means "song of the goats," referring to the chorus of satyrs. Others suggest that the term came into being when the legendary Thespis (the root for the English word thespian) competed in the first tragic competition for the prize of a goat (hence tragedy).

Alexandrian grammarians understood the term τραγῳδία as a "song for the sacrifice of the goat" or "song for the goat", believing the animal was a prize in a race, as attested by Horace's Ars Poetica:

The poet, who first tried his skill in tragic verse for the paltry prize of a goat, soon after exposed to view wild satyrs naked, and attempted raillery with severity, still preserving the gravity of tragedy.

— Horace, Ars Poetica 220 (Smart & Buckley translation)

=== Other hypotheses ===
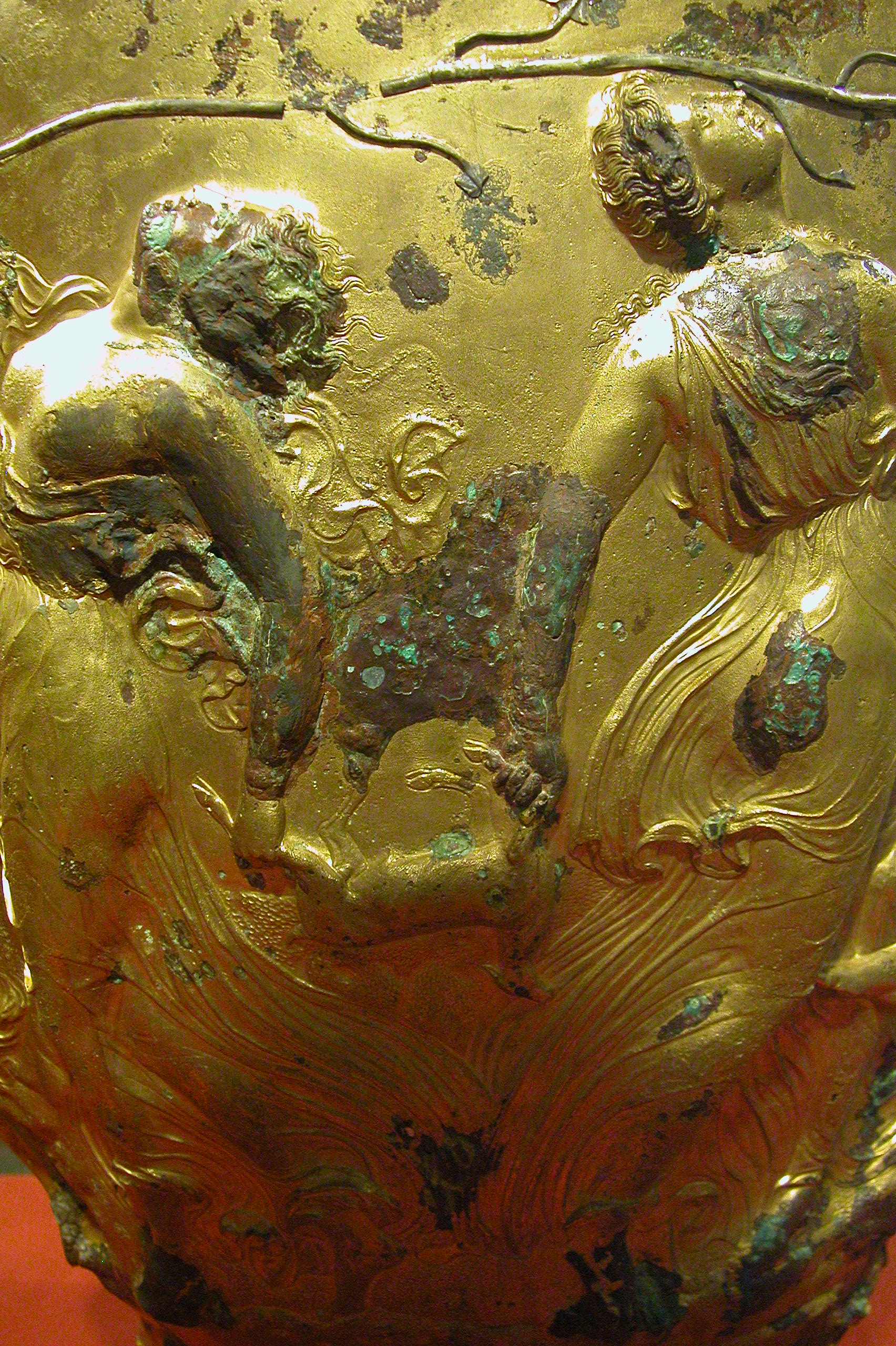
Maenads dancing, bringing a sacrificial lamb or kid

There are other suggested etymologies for the word tragedy. The Oxford English Dictionary adds to the standard reference to "goat song", that:

As to the reason of the name, many theories have been offered, some even disputing the connection with ‘goat’.

J. Winkler proposed that "tragedy" could be derived from the rare word tragizein (τραγίζειν), which refers to "adolescent voice-change" referring to the original singers as "representative of those undergoing social puberty". D'Amico, on the other hand, suggests that tragoidía does not mean simply "song of the goats", but the characters that made up the satyr chorus of the first Dionysian rites.

Other hypotheses have included an etymology that would define the tragedy as an ode to beer. Jane Ellen Harrison pointed out that Dionysus, god of wine (a drink of the wealthy classes) was actually preceded by Dionysus, god of beer (a drink of the working classes). Athenian beer was obtained from the fermentation of barley, which is tragos in Greek. Thus, it is likely that the term was originally meant to be "odes to spelt," and later on, it was extended to other meanings of the same name. She writes: "Tragedy I believe to be not the 'goat-song', but the 'harvest-song' of the cereal tragos, the form of spelt known as 'the goat'."

== Evolution ==
=== Origin ===
The origin of Greek tragedy is one of the unsolved problems of classical scholarship. Ruth Scodel notes that, due to lack of evidence and doubtful reliability of sources, we know nearly nothing about tragedy's origin. Still, R.P. Winnington-Ingram points out that we can easily trace various influences from other genres. The stories that tragedy deals with stem from epic and lyric poetry, its meter—the iambic trimeter—owed much to the political rhetoric of Solon, and the choral songs' dialect, meter and vocabulary seem to originate in choral lyric. How these have come to be associated with one another remains a mystery however.

Speculating on the problem, Scodel writes that:

Three innovations must have taken place for tragedy as we know it to exist. First, somebody created a new kind of performance by combining a speaker with a chorus and putting both speaker and chorus in disguise as characters in a story from legend or history. Second, this performance was made part of the City Dionysia at Athens. Third, regulations defined how it was to be managed and paid for. It is theoretically possible that all these were simultaneous, but it is not likely.

=== From dithyramb to drama ===
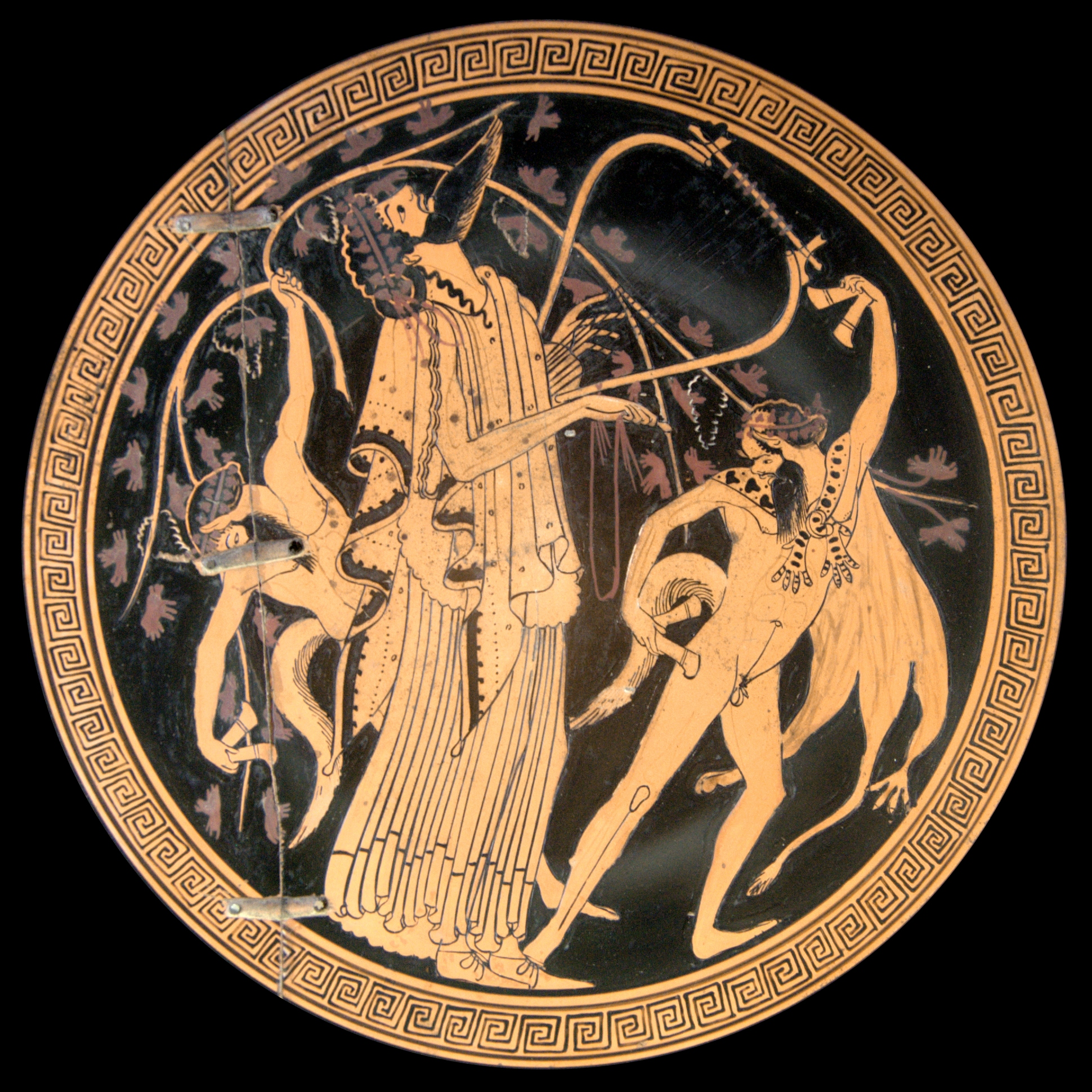
Dionysus surrounded by satyrs. Attic red-figured cup interior, 480 BC.

Aristotle writes in the Poetics that, in the beginning, tragedy was an improvisation "by those who led off the dithyramb", which was a hymn in honor of Dionysus. This was brief and burlesque in tone because it contained elements of the satyr play. Gradually, the language became more serious and the meter changed from trochaic tetrameter to the more prosaic iambic trimeter. In Herodotus's Histories and later sources, the lyric poet Arion of Methymna is said to be the inventor of the dithyramb. The dithyramb was originally improvised, but later written down before performance. The Greek chorus of up to 50 men and boys danced and sang in a circle, probably accompanied by an aulos, relating to some event in the life of Dionysus.

Scholars have made a number of suggestions about the way the dithyramb changed into tragedy. "Somebody, presumably Thespis, decided to combine spoken verse with choral song. ... As tragedy developed, the actors began to interact more with each other, and the role of the chorus became smaller." Scodell notes that:

The Greek word for “actor” is hypocrites, which means “answerer” or “interpreter,” but the word cannot tell us anything about tragedy’s origins, since we do not know when it came into use.

Also, Easterling says:

There is ... much to be said for the view that hypokrites means 'answerer'. He answers the questions of the chorus and so evokes their songs. He answers with a long speech about his own situation or, when he enters as messenger, with a narrative of disastrous events ... Naturally, the transformation of the leader into an actor entailed a dramatization of the chorus.

=== The first tragedies ===
Tradition attributes Thespis as the first person to represent a character in a play. This took place in 534 BC during the Dionysia established by Peisistratus. Of his tragedies we know little except that the choir was still formed by Satyrs and that, according to Aristotle, he was the first to win a dramatic contest, and the first actor (ὑποκριτής) who portrayed a character rather than speaking as himself. Moreover, Themistius, a writer of the 4th century AD, reports that Thespis invented the prologue as well as the spoken part (ῥῆσις). Other playwrights of the time were Choerilus, author of probably one hundred and sixty tragedies (with thirteen victories), and Pratinas of Phlius, author of fifty works, of which thirty-two are satyr plays. We have little record of these works except their titles. At this time, satyr plays were presented alongside tragedies. Pratinas definitely competed with Aeschylus and worked from 499 BC.

Another playwright was Phrynichus. Aristophanes sings his praises in his plays: for example, The Wasps presents him as a radical democrat close to Themistocles. Besides introducing dialogues in iambic trimeter and including female characters for the first time, Phrynichus also introduced historical content to the genre of tragedy (e.g. in the Capture of Miletus). His first victory in a contest was in 510 BC. At this time, the organization of plays into trilogies began.

=== Aeschylus: the codification ===
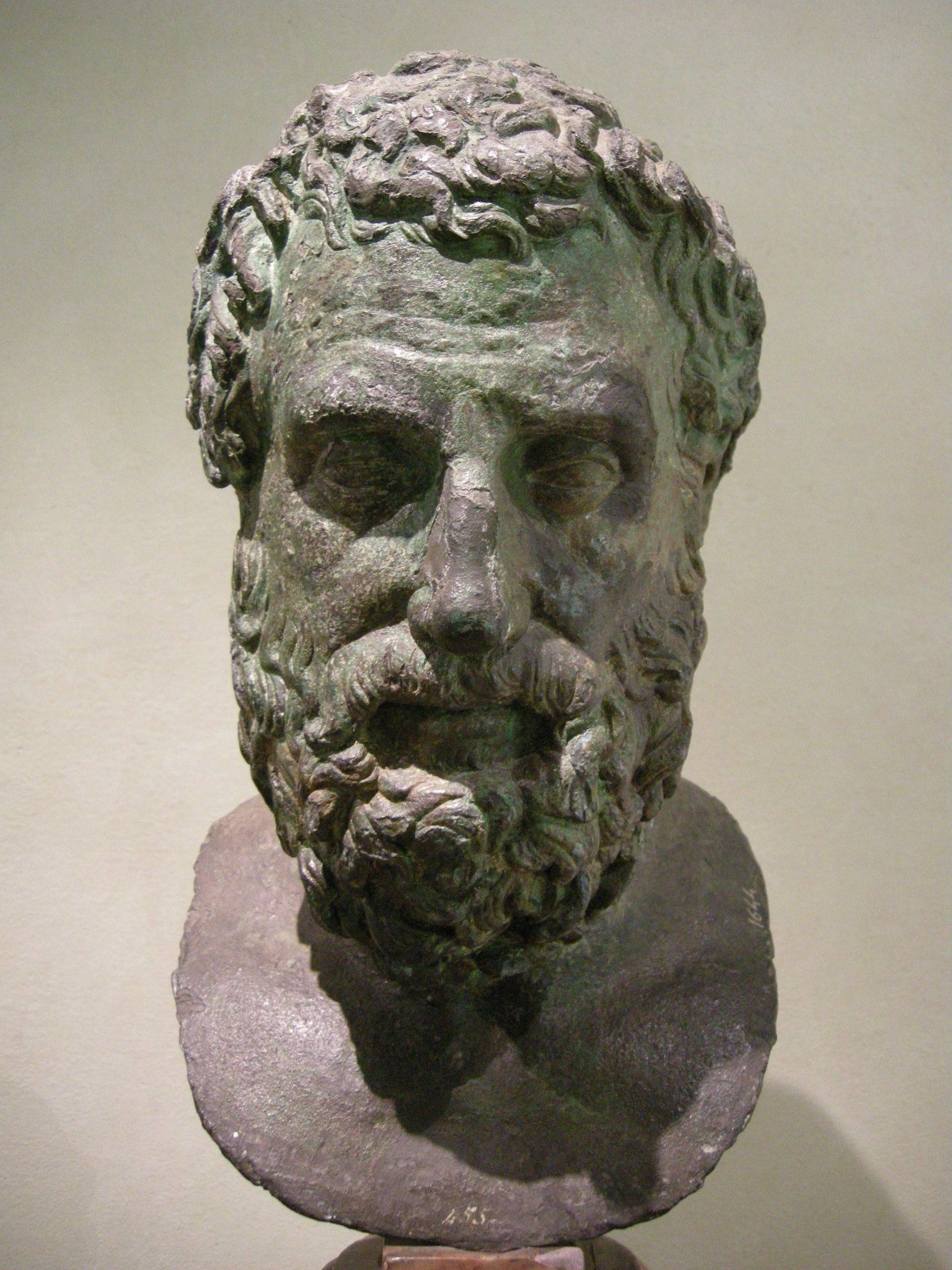
Aeschylus

Aeschylus was to establish the basic rules of tragic drama. He is credited with inventing the trilogy, a series of three tragedies that tell one long story, and introduced the second actor, making the dramatization of a conflict possible. Trilogies were performed in sequence over a full day, sunrise to sunset. At the end of the last play, a satyr play was staged to revive the spirits of the public, possibly depressed by the events of the tragedy. (Note: Some discussion exists on the function of satyr plays, however. See: Griffith (2002).)

In the work of Aeschylus, comparing the first tragedies with those of subsequent years, there is an evolution and enrichment of the proper elements of tragic drama: dialogue, contrasts, and theatrical effects. This is due to the competition in which the older Aeschylus was with other playwrights, especially the young Sophocles, who introduced a third actor, increased plot complexity and developed more human characters, with which the audience could identify.

Aeschylus was at least partially receptive to Sophocles' innovations, but remained faithful to a very strict morality and a very intense religiosity. So, for instance, in Aeschylus, Zeus always has the role of ethical thinking and action. (Note: An exception is Prometheus Bound, in which Zeus strikes tyrannical attitudes.) Musically Aeschylus remains tied to the nomoi, rhythmic and melodic structures developed in the Archaic period.

=== The reforms of Sophocles ===
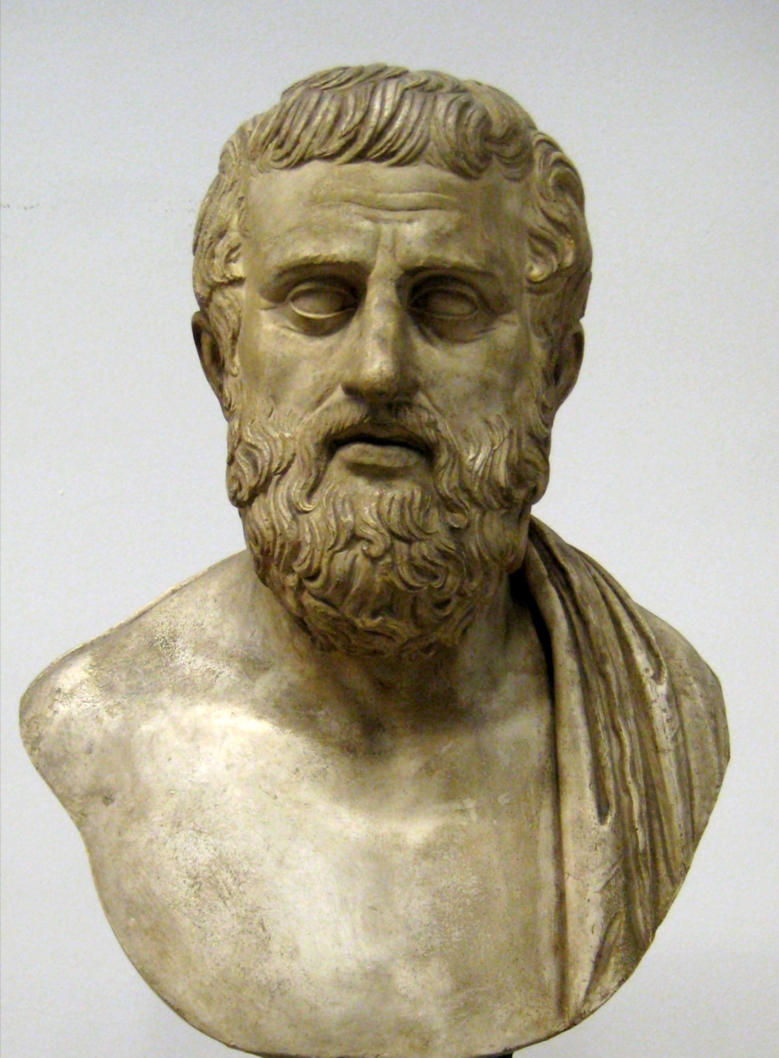
Sophocles

Plutarch, in the Life of Cimon, recounts the first triumph of the young talented Sophocles against the famous and hitherto unchallenged Aeschylus. This competition ended in an unusual manner, without the usual draw for the referees, and caused the voluntary exile of Aeschylus to Sicily. Many innovations were introduced by Sophocles, and earned him at least twenty triumphs. He introduced a third actor, increased the number of chorus members to fifteen; he also introduced scenery and the use of scenes.

Compared to Aeschylus, the chorus became less important in explaining the plot and there was a greater emphasis on character development and conflict. In Oedipus at Colonus, the chorus repeats "not to be born is best." The events that overwhelm the lives of the heroes are in no way explained or justified, and in this we see the beginning of a painful reflection on the human condition, still current in the contemporary world.

=== The realism of Euripides ===
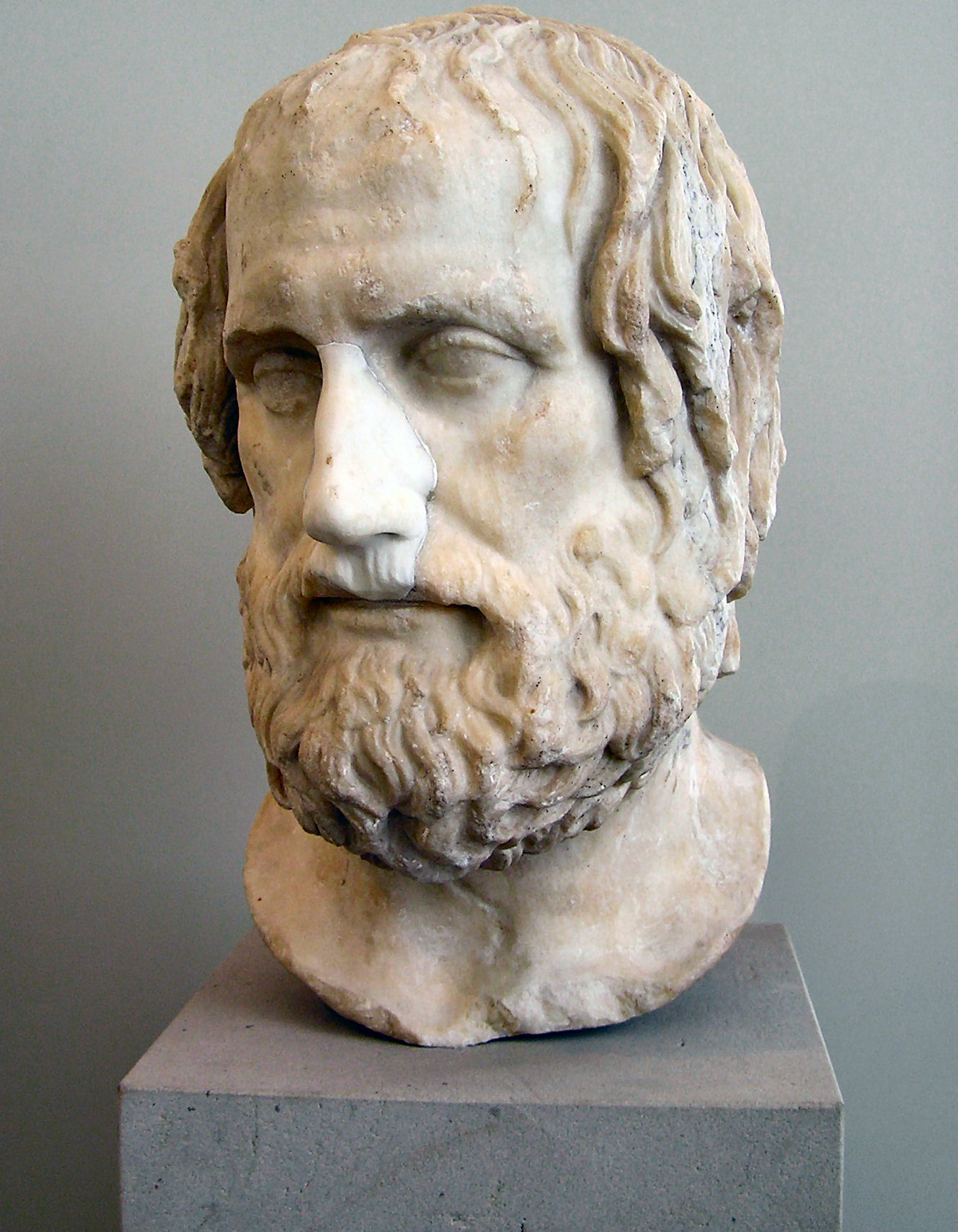
Euripides

The peculiarities that distinguish Euripides' tragedies from those of the other two playwrights are the search for technical experimentation, and increased attention for feelings, as a mechanism to elaborate the unfolding of tragic events.

The experimentation carried out by Euripides in his tragedies can be observed mainly in three aspects that characterize his theater: he turned the prologue into a monologue informing the spectators of the story's background, introduced the deus ex machina and gradually diminished the choir's prominence from the dramatic point of view in favor of a monody sung by the characters.

Another novelty of Euripidean drama is represented by the realism with which the playwright portrays his characters' psychological dynamics. The hero described in his tragedies is no longer the resolute character as he appears in the works of Aeschylus and Sophocles, but often an insecure person, troubled by internal conflict.

He uses female protagonists of the plays, such as Andromache, Phaedra and Medea, to portray the tormented sensitivity and irrational impulses that collide with the world of reason.

== Structure ==
The structure of Greek tragedy is characterized by a set of conventions. The tragedy usually begins with a prologue, (from pro and logos, "preliminary speech") in which one or more characters introduce the drama and explain the background of the ensuing story. The prologue is followed by the parodos (entry of the characters/group) (πάροδος), after which the story unfolds through three or more episodes (ἐπεισόδια, epeisodia). The episodes are interspersed by stasima (στάσιμoν, stasimon), choral interludes explaining or commenting on the situation developing in the play. In the episode, there is usually interaction between characters and the chorus. The tragedy ends with the exodus (ἔξοδος), concluding the story. Some plays do not adhere to this conventional structure. Aeschylus' The Persians and Seven Against Thebes, for example, have no prologue.

== Language ==
The Greek dialects used are the Attic dialect for the parts spoken or recited by individual characters, and a literary Doric dialect for the choral odes. For the metre, the spoken parts mainly use the iambic (iambic trimeter), described as the most natural by Aristotle, while the choral parts rely on a variety of meters. Anapaests were typically used as the chorus or a character moved on or off the stage, and lyric metres were used for the choral odes. These included Dactylo-epitrites and various Aeolic metres, sometimes interspersed with iambics. Dochmiacs often appear in passages of extreme emotion.

== Greek tragedy in dramatic theory ==
=== Mimesis and catharsis ===
As already mentioned, Aristotle wrote the first critical study of the tragedy: the Poetics. He uses the concepts of mimesis (μίμησις, "imitation"), and catharsis or katharsis (κάθαρσις, "cleansing") to explain the function of tragedy. He writes: "Tragedy is, therefore, an imitation (mimēsis) of a noble and complete action [...] which through compassion and fear produces purification of the passions." Whereas mimēsis implies an imitation of human affairs, catharsis means a certain emotional cleansing of the spectator. What exactly is meant by "emotional cleansing" (κάθαρσις των παθήματων) however, remains unclear throughout the work. Although many scholars have attempted to define this element vital to the understanding of Aristotle's Poetics, they remain divided on the subject.

Gregory, for instance, argues that there is "a close relationship between tragic katharsis and the transformation of pity and fear [...] into essentially pleasurable emotions in the theater".

Katharsis, on this reading, will denote the overall ethical benefit that accrues from such an intense yet fulfillingly integrated experience. Exempt from the stresses that accompany pity and fear in social life, the audience of tragedy can allow these emotions an uninhibited flow that ... is satisfyingly attuned to its contemplation of the rich human significance of a well-plotted play. A katharsis of this kind is not reducible to either ‘‘purgation’’ or ‘‘purification.’’

Lear promotes as "the most sophisticated view of katharsis", the idea that it "provides an education for the emotions." "Tragedy ... provides us with the appropriate objects towards which to feel pity or fear."

=== The three unities ===
The three Aristotelian unities of drama are the unities of time, place and action. While Aristotle did emphasize the unity of action, the idea of three unities as hard rules of dramatic art appeared only much later, during the Renaissance.

1. Unity of action: a play should have one main action that it follows, with no or few subplots.
2. Unity of place: a play should cover a single physical space and should not attempt to compress geography, nor should the stage represent more than one place.
3. Unity of time: the action in a play should take place over no more than 24 hours.

Aristotle asserted that a play must be complete and whole, in other words, it must have unity, i.e. a beginning, a middle and an end. The philosopher also asserted that the action of epic poetry and tragedy differ in length, "because in tragedy every effort is made for it to take place in one revolution of the sun, while the epic is unlimited in time."

These unities were considered key elements of the theatre until a few centuries ago, although they were not always observed (such as by authors like Shakespeare, Calderón de la Barca and Moliere).

=== Apollonian and Dionysian: the analysis of Nietzsche ===
Friedrich Nietzsche at the end of the 19th century highlighted the contrast between the two main elements of tragedy: firstly, the Dionysian (the passion that overwhelms the character) and the Apollonian (the purely pictorial imagery of the theatrical spectacle).

Contrasted with that is nemesis, the divine punishment that determines the fall or death of the character.

In ancient Greek culture, says Nietzsche, "there is a conflict between the plastic arts, namely the Apollonian, and non-plastic art of music, the Dionysian."

Both drives, so different from each other, go side by side, mostly in open discord and opposition, always provoking each other to new, stronger births, in order to perpetuate in themselves the struggle of opposites which is only apparently bridged over by the common word 'art'; until, finally, by a wonderful act of Hellenic 'will,' they seem to pair up and in this pairing, at last, produce Attic Tragedy, which is as much a Dionysian as an Apollonian artwork.

== As a mass phenomenon ==
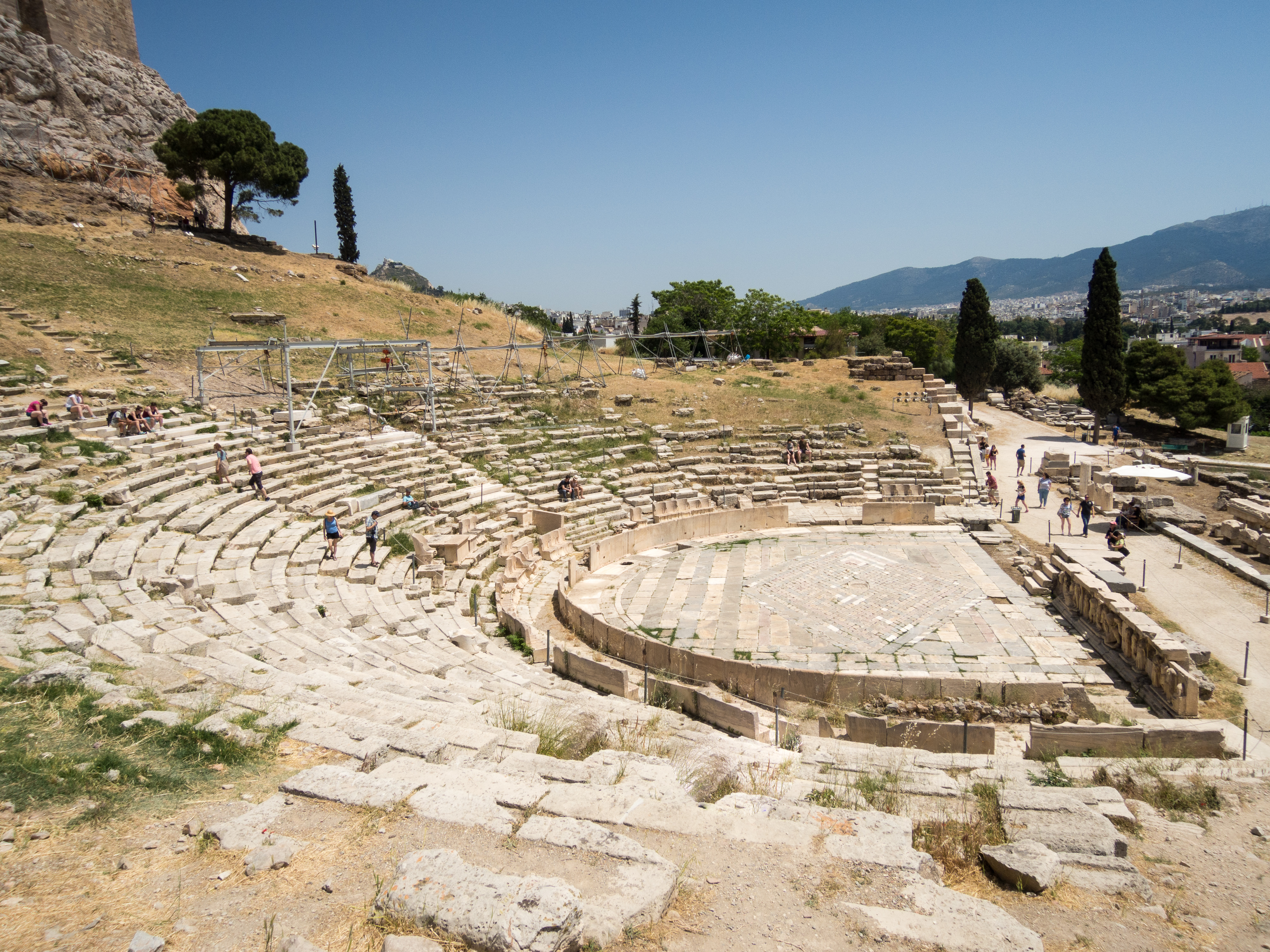
The theatre of Dionysus in Athens

Greek tragedy as we understand it today, was not merely a show, but rather a collective ritual of the polis. It took place in a sacred, consecrated space (the altar of the god stood at the center of the theatre).

A spectator of a Greek dramatic performance in the latter half of the fifth century B.C. would find himself seated in the theatron, or koilon, a semi-circular, curved bank of seats, resembling in some respects the closed end of a horseshoe stadium. ... Below him, in the best location in the theatre, is the throne of the priest of Dionysus who presides in a sense over the whole performance. The theatron is large-in fact, the one in Athens, in the Theatre of Dionysus, with its seats banked up on the south slope of the Acropolis, seated approximately 17,000 persons.

The spectator sees before him a level circular area called the orchestra, which means literally the "dancing place". ... In the centre of the orchestra stands an altar. A part of the dramatic action will take place in the orchestra, as well as the manoeuvres and dance figures performed by the Chorus as they present their odes. To the right and left of the theatron are the parodoi, which are used not only by the spectators for entering and leaving the theatre, but also for the entrances and exits of actors and the Chorus. Directly beyond the circular orchestra lies the skene or scene building. ... In most plays the skene represents the facade of a house, a palace, or a temple. The skene normally had three doors which served as additional entrances and exits for the actors. Immediately in front of the scene-building was a level platform, in the fifth century B.C. in all probability only a single step above the level of the orchestra. This was called the proskenion or logeion where much of the dramatic action of the plays takes place. Flanking the proskenion were two projecting wings, the so-called paraskenia. It must be remembered that the skene, since at first it was only a wooden structure, was flexible in its form, and was probably modified frequently.

The theatre voiced ideas and problems from the democratic, political and cultural life of Athens. Tragedies can discuss or use the Greek mythical past as a metaphor for the deep problems of current Athenian society. In such plays, "the poet alludes directly to fifth-century events or developments, but moves them back into the mythological past. In this category [can be placed] Aeschylus’ Persians and Oresteia."

In the case of Aeschylus' tragedy The Persians, it was performed in 472 BC in Athens, eight years after the battle of Salamis, when the war with Persia was still in progress. It tells the story of the Persian fleet's defeat at Salamis and how the ghost of former Persian King Darius accuses his son Xerxes of hubris against the Greeks for waging war on them.

"The possibility that a reflection of Athens is to be seen in Aeschylus’ Persian mirror could explain why the poet asks his audience to look at Salamis through Persian eyes and elicits great sympathy for the Persians, including Xerxes."

Other tragedies avoid references or allusions to 5th century BC events, but "also draw the mythological past into the present."

The bulk of the plays in this category are by Euripides. Strains of fifth-century Athenian rhetoric, sketches of political types, and reflections of Athens’ institutions and society lend plays of this category a distinctly fifth-century Athenian flavor. The emphasis in Euripides’ Orestes on political factions, for example, is directly relevant to the Athens of 408 BCE.

The performances of the tragedies took place in Athens on the occasion of the Great Dionysia, feasts in honor of Dionysus celebrated in the month of Elaphebolion, towards the end of March. (Note: The Dionysia was also called Great Dionysia, to distinguish them from rural areas, plays a minor that took place in winter in countries around Athens.) It was organized by the State and the eponymous archon, who picked three of the richest citizens to pay for the drama's expenses. In the Athenian democracy wealthy citizens were required to fund public services, a practice known as liturgy.

During the Dionysia a contest took place between three plays, chosen by the archon eponymous. This procedure might have been based on a provisional script, each of which had to submit a tetralogy consisting of three tragedies and a satyr play. Each tetralogy was recited in one day, so that the recitation of tragedies lasted three days. The fourth day was dedicated to the staging of five comedies. (Note: During the Peloponnesian War the number of comedies was reduced to three, to be performed once a day, at the end of the tetralogies. It has been argued, the Athenians took this decision due to their financial situation at the time.) At the end of these three days a jury of ten people chosen by lot from the body of citizens chose the best choir, best actor and best author. At the end of the performances, the judges placed a tablet inscribed with the name of their choice inside an urn, after which five tablets were randomly selected. The person who received the highest number of votes won. The winning author, actor and choir were thus selected not purely by lot, but chance did play a part.

The passion of the Greeks for the tragedy was overwhelming: Athens, said the critics, spent more on theatre than on the fleet. When the cost for the shows became a sensitive subject, an admission fee was instated, alongside the so-called theorikon, a special fund to pay for festival's expenses.

== The surviving tragedies ==
Of the many tragedies known to have been written, just 32 full-length texts by only three authors, Aeschylus, Sophocles and Euripides, survive. More than 300 are known from fragments.

=== Aeschylus ===
Seventy-nine titles of Aeschylus' works are known (out of about ninety works), both tragedies and satyr plays. Seven of these have survived, including the only complete trilogy which has come down from antiquity, the Oresteia, and some papyrus fragments:

- The Persians (Πέρσαι / Persai), 472 BC;
- Seven Against Thebes (Ἑπτὰ ἐπὶ Θήβας / Hepta epi Thebas), 467 BC;
- Suppliants (Ἱκέτιδες / Hiketides), probably 463 BC;
- The trilogy Oresteia (Ὀρέστεια / Oresteia), 458 BC, consisting of:
  - Agamemnon (Ἀγαμέμνων / Agamemnon);
  - Choephoroi (Χοηφόροι / Choephoroi);
  - Furies (Εὐμενίδες / Eumenides);
- Prometheus Bound (Προμηθεὺς δεσμώτης / Prometheus desmotes) of uncertain date and considered spurious by some scholars. (Note: The presence of attacks on Zeus casts doubt onto the authorship of Aeschylus's Prometheus Bound.)

=== Sophocles ===
According to Aristophanes of Byzantium, Sophocles wrote 130 plays, 17 of which are spurious; the Suda lexicon counted 123. (Note: Some scholars equate the two sources, assuming an error of Aristophanes, of 17 instead of 7. Cf. Rossi & Nicolai 2006, p 93.) Of all Sophocles's tragedies, only seven remain intact:

- Ajax (Αἴας / Aias) around 445 BC;
- Antigone (Ἀντιγόνη / Antigone), 442 BC;
- Women of Trachis (Tραχίνιαι / Trachiniai), date unknown;
- Oedipus Rex (Οἰδίπoυς τύραννoς / Oidipous Tyrannos) around 430 BC;
- Electra (Ἠλέκτρα / Elektra), date unknown;
- Philoctetes (Φιλοκτήτης / Philoktētēs), 409 BC;
- Oedipus at Colonus (Oἰδίπoυς ἐπὶ Κολωνῷ / Oidipous epi Kolōnōi), 406 BC.

Apart from the plays that have survived in their entirety, we also possess a large part of the satyr play Ἰχνευταί or Trackers, which was found at the beginning of the 20th century on a papyrus containing three-quarters of this work.

=== Euripides ===
According to the Suda, Euripides wrote either 75 or 92 plays, of which survive eighteen tragedies and the only complete surviving satyr play, the Cyclops.

His extant works are:

- Alcestis (Ἄλκηστις / Alkestis), 438 BC;
- Medea (Μήδεια / Medeia), 431 BC;
- Heracleidae (Ἡρακλεῖδαι / Herakleìdai), c. 430 BC;
- Hippolytus (Ἱππόλυτος στεφανοφόρος / Hippolytos stephanophoros), 428 BC;
- The Trojan Women (Τρώαδες / Troades), 415 BC;
- Andromache (Ἀνδρομάχη /Andromache), date unknown;
- Hecuba (Ἑκάβη / Hekabe), 423 BC;
- Suppliants (Ἱκέτιδες / Hiketides), 414 BC;
- Ion (Ἴων / Ion);
- Iphigenia in Tauris (Ἰφιγένεια ἡ ἐν Ταύροις / Iphighèneia he en Taurois);
- Electra (Ἠλέκτρα / Elektra);
- Helen (Ἑλένη / Helene), 412 BC;
- Heracles (Ἡρακλῆς μαινόμενος / Herakles mainomenos);
- The Phoenician Women (Φοινίσσαι / Phoinissai) circa 408 BC;
- Orestes (Ὀρέστης /Orestes), 408 BC;
- Iphigenia in Aulis (Ἰφιγένεια ἡ ἐν Αὐλίδι / Iphighèneia he en Aulìdi), 410 BC;
- The Bacchae (Βάκχαι / Bakchai), 406 BC;
- Cyclops (Κύκλωψ / Kuklops) (satyr);
- Rhesus (Ῥῆσος / Resos) (possibly spurious).

== Fragmentary Greek tragedy ==
Although only 32 full-length plays survive, many further works are attested in fragments. Aeschylus, for example, produced at least 70 further works which exist only in fragments.

== The demos in Greek tragedy ==
The role of the audience in a Greek tragedy is to become part of that theatrical illusion, to partake in the act as if they were part of it. "The Demos in Greek Tragedy", frequently addresses the works of Euripides. The way he addresses the audience through his plays is usually implied and never made obvious, as that would not only break the narrative that is being constructed, it would also fail to further the suspension of disbelief in the audience. The article notes how often the audience is incorporated as being representative of the expected demos, usually by having silent actors, or individuals who are part of the Tragedy, be seated with the audience, to ensure that the actor is engaging with the audience.

Through further exploration into the role of the chorus, the author looks at what impact that may have had from the perspective of the demos. The author notes that it was often the case for tragic choruses to be of one type of social position (in both age, gender, nationality, and class). With regard to gender distinctions, the author finds that despite the fact that female choruses existed within Greek plays in general, they, like other enslaved and foreign individuals, lacked the same kind of status as male Greeks. Those not considered citizens were not representative of the demos. The author gives an example of how a female chorus in Aeschylus' Seven against Thebes, is criticized for being bad for citizen morale.

The author further notes how male-based choruses were designated by name based on their "factions within the citizenry" (p. 66). For example, if the chorus were composed of boys from Argive, then one would refer to them as "Argive boys" (p. 66). However, a much clearer distinction is made with adult males, such as "jury-service-loving old men (Wasps)" (p. 66), which indicates that the chorus is composed entirely of older men who are part of a jury service, further indicating their role within the citizenry. The citizen chorus was not only distinguished by status but was also seen as a subset of the demos.

== Tragedy as performance ==
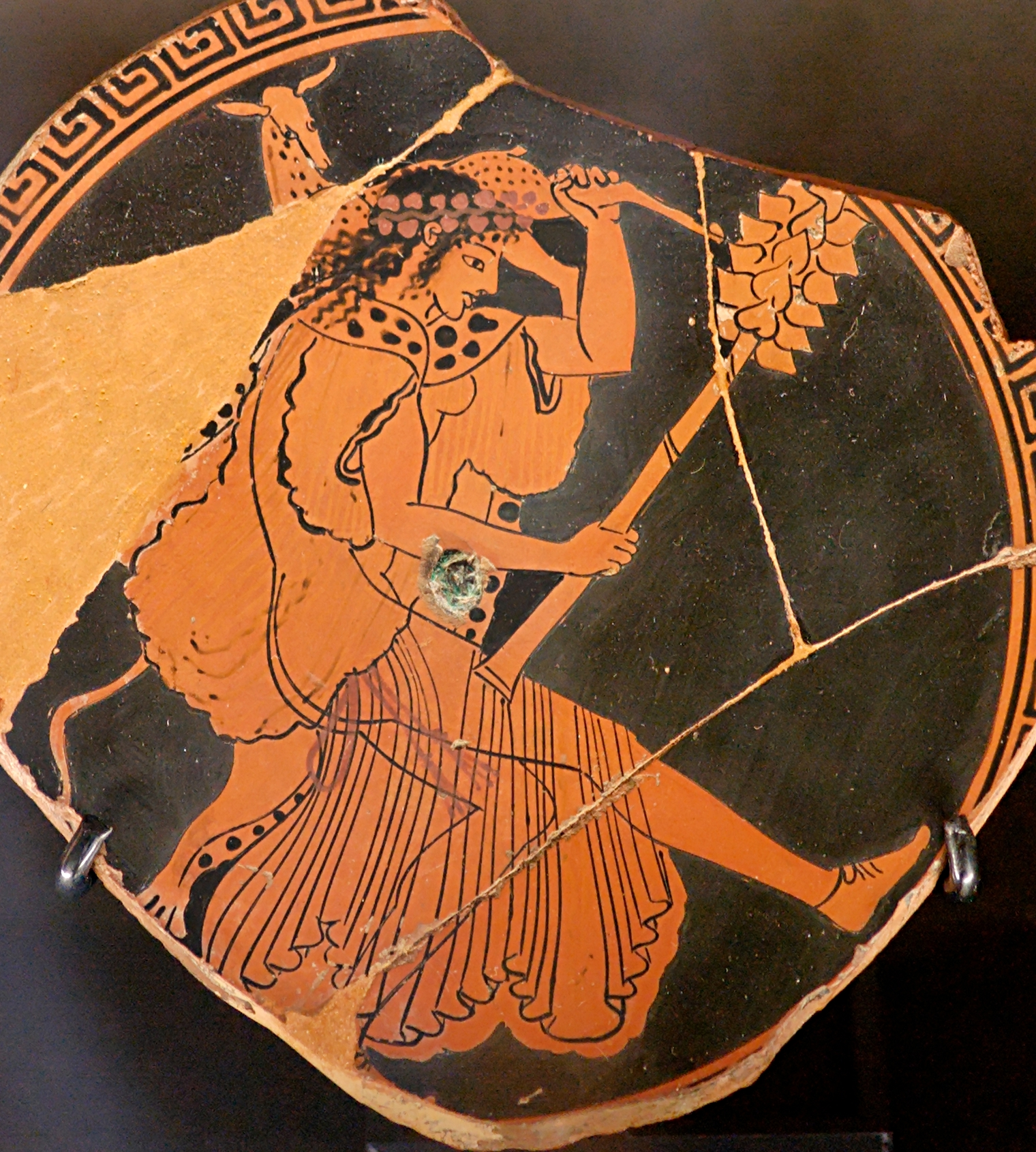
Maenad, fragment of an Attic red-figure cup, c. 480 BC.

Greek tragedy can often become confusing when trying to assess it as a drama, a detailed event, a performance, or even as something conveying an underlying theme. An article by Mario Frendo, looks at the latter as a phenomenon of performance, a separation in the meaning of the play from what it is actually being conveyed, and not an attempt to approach Greek tragedy through context (e.g., conventions of performance, historical facts, etc.). Approaching antiquity from a contemporary outlook, especially with regard to the construction and form of the plays, hinders any understanding of classical Greek society.

The origins of Greek tragedy were mostly based on song or speech rather than written script. In this way, Frendo states that Tragedy by its nature, was performative. Frendo furthers his argument by drawing on previous research into Greek tragedy. He elaborates on the musical, often sing-song nature of the plays, and looks at oral tradition as the backdrop to the construction of these plays (e.g., oral tradition may play a role in the processes that lead to the creation of Greek tragedy). Frendo draws on the notion that the experience of tragedy requires a theatrical performance and is in that sense, a separation of tragedy from literature. Further stating that it is essential to look at tragedy as pre-drama, that it does not fit with a more contemporary envisioning of "drama" as we would've seen under the Renaissance.

After dialogue based interactions were eventually brought into development, the percentage of scripts read by the chorus tended to decrease in regards to their involvement in the play. Therefore, the author concludes that this not only demonstrates the performative nature of Greek tragedy but also brings forth the possibility that dialogic based strategies may have been employed.

== Deus ex machina ==
An article by Thomas Duncan discusses the impact of dramatic technique on the influence of tragic plays and conveying important or essential outcomes, particularly through the use of deus ex machina. This is a technique in which an action is halted by the appearance of an unforeseen character or through the intervention of a god, that essentially brings about a conclusion to a play. One such example can be seen with Euripides' play, Hippolytus. In the play, Hippolytus is cursed with an untimely death by his father, Theseus, for the supposed rape and subsequent suicide of Queen Phaedra, his step-mother. However, Queen Phaedra commits suicide due to unwanted desire for Hippolytus (instigated by the goddess, Aphrodite) and thus, blames her death on Hippolytus.

Hippolytus' demise is brought forth by a god, Aphrodite, whose hatred of Hippolytus' and his unending devotion to Artemis stems from his subsequent disparagement or denial of Aphrodite. In other words, because Hippolytus chooses to devote himself to the goddess, Artemis, whose themai, or divine domain, is chastity, for some reason, he decides to then deny the existence of another goddesses divine domain, Aphrodite's' themai, lust, the polar opposite to chastity. The play demonstrates how divine intervention sets in motion the main theme of the play, revenge, and how that leads to the downfall of a royal family. However, it is not until the end of the play, when Artemis intervenes to tell King Theseus that he has killed his son by cursing him, that he has fallen prey to the workings of Aphrodite.

Without this kind of divine intervention, Theseus would not have realized his mistakes and Hippolytus would not have been cursed. Without divine intervention, the events that transpired would not have been as effective in revealing certain truths to the audience if they were to have come from a fellow human. In this way, such a technique is essential to the mechanisms of Greek tragedy and the capabilities of the tragedian in conveying their play as more than just a story or detailed event.

== Character identification ==
Character identification can be seen in many of Aeschylus' plays, such as Prometheus Bound. In this play, Prometheus, the Titan god of forethought and the inventing fire, stole the inventing flame from Hephaestus and gave it to humanity. Thereby, bestowing upon humanity knowledge of the arts, angering the gods. The idea behind this Greek tragedy is that Prometheus is punished by Zeus not only for the crime of giving humanity divine knowledge but also for believing that by doing so, humanity would, in some way, praise Prometheus as a champion for justice and see Zeus as nothing more than a tyrant. Through this the author notes how Aeschylus' play relates to this notion of character identification, as it depicts a being who is not necessarily acting out of selfish intention but in many ways was willing to be punished for the betterment of Humanity.

== Gender and tragedy ==
Although all actors and choruses were male, female protagonists and choruses were common in tragedy (especially in Euripides). In general, tragedy played with gender dynamics, representing feminine men and masculine women. This was so common as to be a defining feature of the genre. However, the female characters of tragedy are deeply ambiguous, often incarnating disorder and destruction within the home and the city. Characters like Medea and Clytemnestra are bold and prone to speaking outside of the house, whereas the ideal Athenian woman was much more meek and private. Indeed, Aristophanes lampooned Euripides for his 'misogynistic' portrayal of women in his Thesmophoriazusae, indicating that the bold women of tragedy were not necessarily seen as admirable.

== Bibliography ==
- Albini, U. (1999) Nel nome di Dioniso. Il grande teatro classico rivisitato con occhio contemporaneo (Milan: Garzanti) ISBN 88-11-67420-4.
- Beye, C.R. La tragedia greca: Guida storica e critica (Rome: Laterza) ISBN 88-420-3206-9.
- Brunet, P. (1997) La Naissance de la littérature dans la Grèce ancienne (Paris: Le Livre de Poche).
- Easterling e.a. (eds.) (1989) The Cambridge History of Classical Literature Vol. 1 Pt. 2: Greek Drama (Cambridge: Cambridge University Press).
- Gregory, J. (2005). A Companion to Greek Tragedy. Oxford: Blackwell Publishing.
- Griffith, M. (2002) ‘Slaves of Dionysos: satyrs, audience, and the ends of the Oresteia' in: Classical Antiquity 21: 195–258.
- Harvey, A. E. (1955) "The Classification of Greek Lyric Poetry" in: Classical Quarterly 5.
- Lear, J. (1992) 'Katharsis' in: A.O. Rorty (ed.) Essays on Aristotle's Poetics (Princeton: Princeton University Press).
- Ley, G. (2015) 'Acting Greek Tragedy' (Exeter: University of Exeter Press).
- Nietzsche, F. (1962) 'La nascita della tragedia' in: Opere scelte L. Scalero (trans.) (Milan: Longanesi).
- Privitera, G.A. & Pretagostini, R. (1997) Storia e forme della letteratura greca. Età arcaica ed età classica (Einaudi Scuola: Milan) ISBN 88-286-0352-6.
- Rossi, L.E.; Nicolai, R. (2006). Corso integrato di letteratura greca. L'età classica. Grassina: Le Monnier. ISBN 978-88-00-20328-9.
- Sinisi, S. & Innamorati, I. (2003) Storia del teatro: lo spazio scenico dai greci alle avanguardie storiche (Bruno Mondadori: Milan).
