= Triptolemos (play) =

Lost play by Sophocles (performed 468 BC)

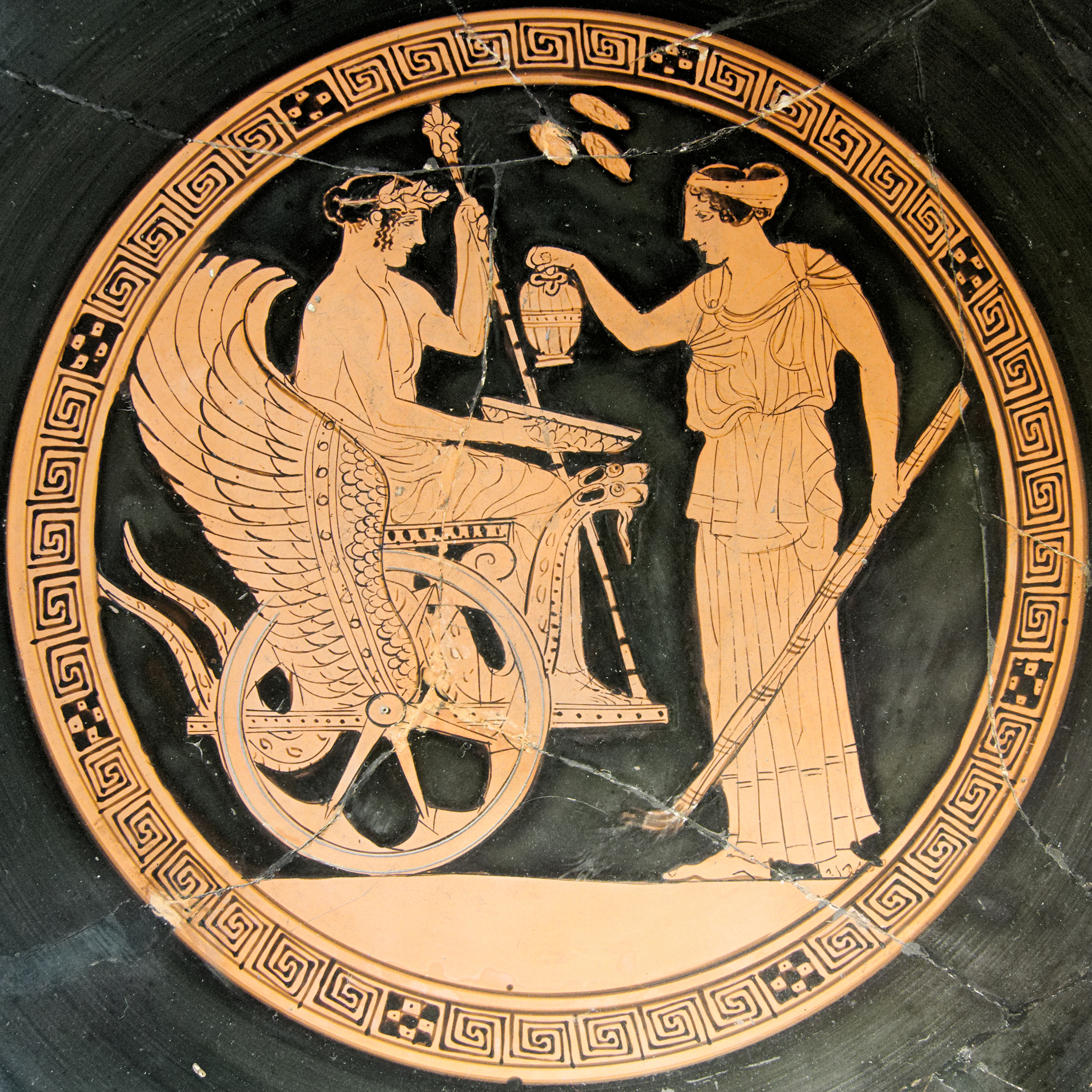
- Triptolemos, on his winged chariot, with Persephone, on an Attic kylix of c. 470 – c. 460 BC. Sophocles's play is believed to be the first appearance of this chariot in literature.
- Original language: Ancient Greek
- Written by: Sophocles
- Based on: Myth of Triptolemos
- Genre: Tragedy or satyr play

Premiere
- Date: 468 BC
- Place: Athens

Triptolemos (Ancient Greek: Τριπτόλεμος) is a lost play of Sophocles. It told the story of Triptolemos, a native of Eleusis who was given the mission by the goddess Demeter of teaching the knowledge of agriculture to the world. Although its date was once disputed, it is now believed to have been performed in 468 BC, at the Great Dionysia in Athens, where it won Sophocles his first victory.

The play is the first known literary appearance of the myth of Triptolemos, which is known from Attic vase painting from around 540 BCE, and is the first textual attestation of the winged, serpent-formed chariot given to him by Demeter to assist him in his mission. It is unclear whether the genre of the play was a serious tragedy or a comic satyr play, both of which would have been included in a tragedian's entry at the Dionysia. Other details of its plot and content have been conjectured, including the idea that the interactions between Demeter and Triptolemos followed a prototype established by Sophocles's older rival Aeschylus, and that Sophocles may have portrayed Demeter as Triptolemos's nurse.

== Content ==
Though the play is usually assumed to have been a tragedy, this is not certain, and it might instead have been a satyr play. The plot of the play is not known, though it probably centered around Triptolemos's mission, given to him by the goddess Demeter, to bring the art of agriculture to the peoples of the world.

Fragments of the lost play still remain. In one scene, Demeter outlines the geography of the countries that Triptolemos will visit on his journey: Günther Zuntz sees this as a reworking of a similar scene in Aeschylus's Prometheus Bound, and therefore as an "antagonistic" gesture by the younger Sophocles towards his rival. The first-century BC historian Dionysius of Halicarnassus preserves the following iambic verses, in which Sophocles makes reference to Italy:

τὰ δ᾿ ἐξόπισθε χειρὸς ἐς τὰ δεξιὰ
Οἰνωτρία τε πᾶσα καὶ Τυρσηνικὸς
κόλπος Λιγυστική τε γῆ σε δέξεται

And after this, first, then, upon the right,
Oenotria wide-outstretched and Tyrrhene Gulf,
And next the Ligurian land shall welcome thee.

Another fragment describes the flying chariot given by Demeter to Triptolemos to help him spread the knowledge of agriculture:

δράκοντε θαιρὸν ἀμφιπλὶξ εἰληφότε

a pair of serpents that has taken hold of the axle in their coils

The classicist Daniel Ogden has suggested that this line may have influenced an image of the goddess Athene, riding in a chariot made of two huge serpents, known from an Athenian vase painted c. 440 BC, and potentially played a part in the portrayal of the chariot of Medea in Euripides's play of 431 BC.

The play is believed to be the first known appearance of the myth of Triptolemos's mission in literature, and the first literary attestation of his sending-forth on a winged chariot. The scene is, however, known from vase-paintings from around 540 BC, and among the most common images on painted vessels in the late sixth and early fifth centuries: at least 154 attestations are known. Christiane Sourvinou-Inwood suggests that the play probably followed the myth in having Demeter interact personally with Triptolemos, and consequently that it had an "Aeschylean model" whereby a human character interacts directly with the divine, as opposed to using the later device of deus ex machina. Walter Burkert suggested that Sophocles may have portrayed Demeter as Triptolemos's nurse, in keeping with the trend in contemporary icongraphy to portray Triptolemos as an ephebe rather than a bearded adult.

== Date ==
The Triptolemos was one of Sophocles's first plays; he was around twenty-eight at the time of its production. (Note: Sommerstein 2002, p. 41, who gives his most likely birthdate as 497/496 BC.) He produced it in 468 BC for the City Dionysia, the year he first won the prize for tragedy at the festival. A tragedian's entry to the City Dionysia consisted of three tragedies, usually on a single theme, and a satyr play. Edward Plumptre suggested in 1880 that Sophocles's victory may have been owed to the connection between Triptolemus and his native town of Eleusis, by then a major settlement of Attica, and to the link between his wanderings and the Athenians' interest in trade and seafaring.

The date of the play is given in the Natural History, a first-century AD encyclopaedia by the Roman polymath Pliny the Elder, as "about" (fere) 145 years before the death of Alexander the Great in 323 BC. The significance of the word fere was debated in the eighteenth and nineteenth centuries: Gotthold Ephraim Lessing argued for a date of 468, while Ulrich von Wilamowitz-Moellendorff and others considered it unsound. In an article published in 1993, Zuntz described Pliny's choice of fere as "merely a slight stylistic cliché".

== Works cited ==
- Burkert, Walter (1983) [1972]. Homo Necans: The Anthropology of Ancient Greek Sacrificial Ritual and Myth. Translated by Bing, Peter. Berkely and Los Angeles: University of California Press. ISBN 0-520-05875-5.
- Lloyd-Jones, Hugh, ed. (1996). Sophocles: Fragments of Lost Plays. Loeb Classical Library. Vol. 483. Cambridge, Massachusetts: Harvard University Press. ISBN 0-674-99532-5.
- Matheson, Susan B. (1994). "The Mission of Triptolmus and the Politics of Athens". Greek, Roman and Byzantine Studies. 35 (4): 345–372.
- Ogden, Daniel (2013). Drakon: Dragon Myth and Serpent Cult in the Greek and Roman Worlds. Oxford University Press. ISBN 978-0-19-955732-5.
- Parker, Robert (1996). Athenian Religion: A History. Oxford University Press. ISBN 0-19-814979-4 – via Internet Archive.
- Plumptre, Edward Hayes (1880). The Tragedies of Sophocles. London: William Isbister. OCLC 1157886531 – via Internet Archive.
- Rosen, Ralph (2009) [2005]. "Aristophanes, Old Comedy, and Greek Tragedy". In Bushnell, Rebecca (ed.). A Companion to Tragedy. Chichester: Wiley. pp. 251–268. doi:10.1002/9780470996393. ISBN 978-1-4051-0735-8.
- Sommerstein, Alan Herbert (2002). Greek Drama and Dramatists. Abingdon: Routledge. ISBN 0-415-26027-2.
- Sourvinou-Inwood, Christiane (2003). Tragedy and Athenian Religion. Lanham, Maryland: Lexington Books. ISBN 0-7391-0400-4.
- Zuntz, Günther (1993). "Aeschyli Prometheus". Harvard Studies in Classical Philology. 95: 107–111. doi:10.2307/311378. JSTOR 311378.
