= Cyclops (play) =

Ancient Greek satyr play by Euripides

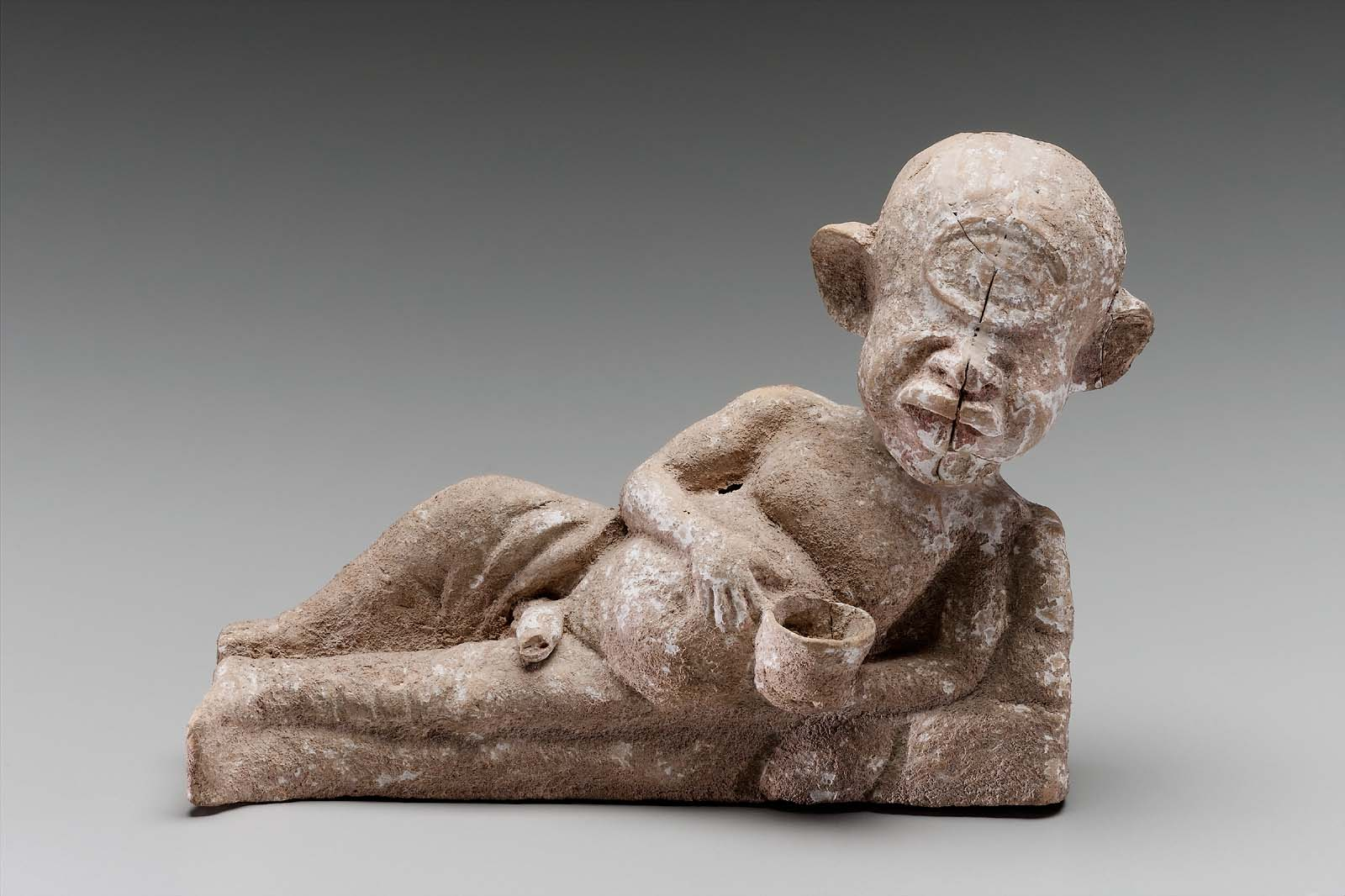
- Late Classical terracotta figure depicting Polyphemos reclining while drinking a bowl of wine.
- Written by: Euripides
- Chorus: Satyrs
- Characters: Silenus; Odysseus; The Cyclops
- Mute: Companions of Odysseus
- Original language: Ancient Greek
- Genre: Satyr play

Premiere
- Place premiered: Athens

Cyclops (Ancient Greek: Κύκλωψ, romanized: Kúklōps) is an ancient Greek satyr play by Euripides, based closely on an episode from the Odyssey. It is likely to have been the fourth part of a tetralogy presented by Euripides in a dramatic festival in 5th-century BC Athens, although its intended and actual performance contexts are unknown. The date of its composition is unknown, but it was probably written late in Euripides' career. Richard Seaford believes that it could have been written as early as 424 BC, but it is more often dated to around 408 BC. It is the only complete satyr play extant.

== Plot ==
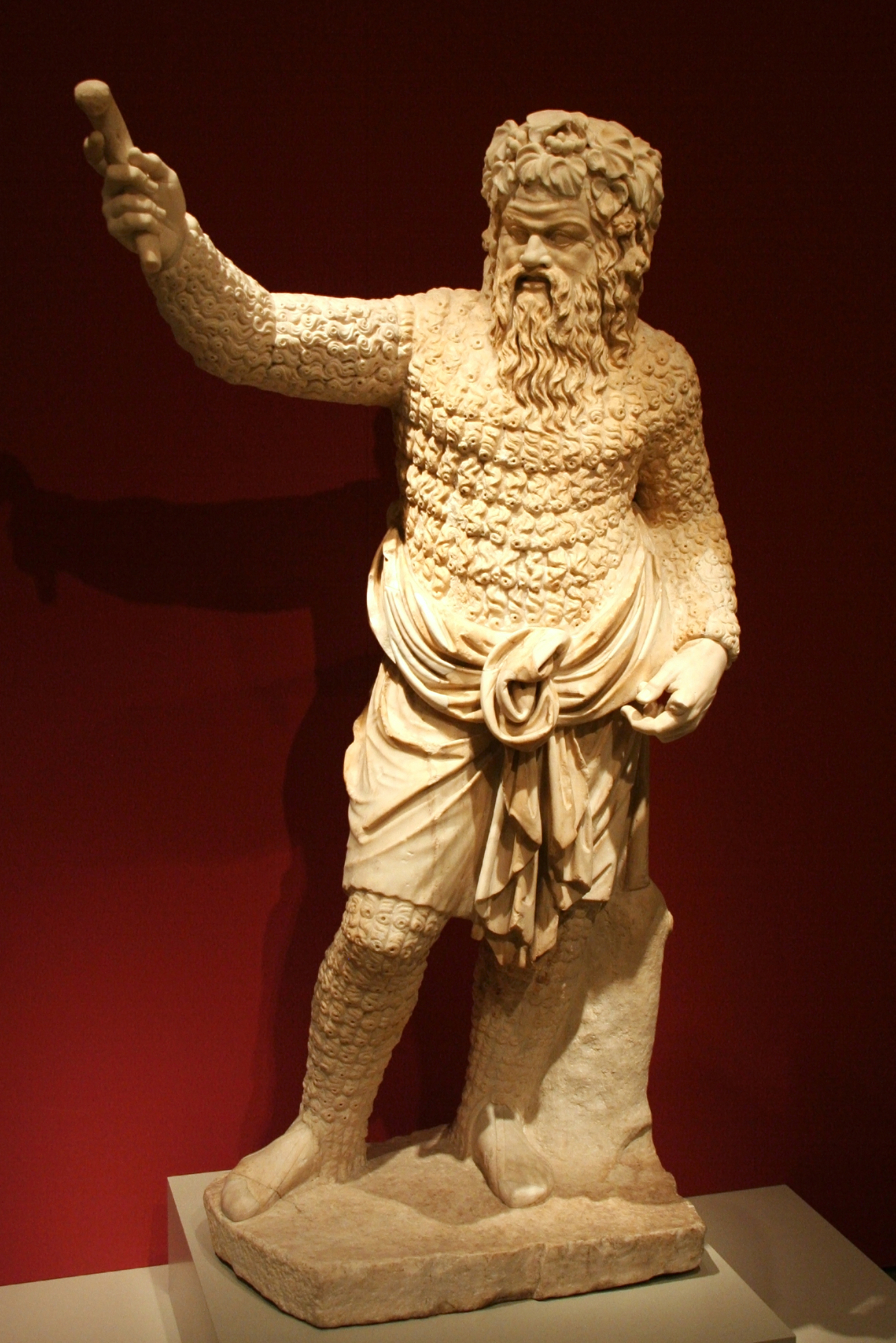
Actor as Papposilenus, around 100 AD, after 4th-century BC original

The play is set in Sicily at Mount Aetna. It begins with an opening monologue by Silenus, who tells the tale of how he and the satyrs (who are his offspring and followers) have been abused by the giant Cyclops (named by him as Polyphemus (l. 25)). The satyrs are now enslaved to work for the Cyclops, and shepherd his flock (ll. 1–85). Odysseus, who has lost his way on the voyage home from the Trojan War, arrives with his hungry sailors. They meet Silenus and offer to trade wine for food. Being a servant of Dionysus, Silenus cannot resist obtaining the wine despite the fact that the food is not his to trade. But the Cyclops soon arrives and Silenus is quick to accuse Odysseus of stealing the food (ll. 86–275).

Odysseus has a lively debate with the Cyclops, arguing against his brutality, and in favor of morality, law, justice and hospitality, while the Cyclops argues in support of personal advantage and pleasure. The Cyclops considers the idea of social justice a fraud created by the weak as protection against the mighty; he is basically an atheist (ἀνόσιος, anosios, impious), and claims that the only thing worthy of worship is wealth. After this debate, the Cyclops brings Odysseus and his crew inside his cave and eats two of them. Odysseus manages to sneak out, stunned by what he has witnessed. In revenge, he plans a scheme to get the Cyclops drunk and blind him with a burning stake after the giant has passed out from inebriation (ll. 276–515).

The Cyclops and Silenus drink together, with Silenus attempting to hoard the wineskin for himself. When the Cyclops is drunk, he says he sees the gods, and begins to call Silenus his Ganymede (the beautiful prince whom Zeus made his immortal cup bearer and lover). The Cyclops then steals Silenus away into his cave, explaining that he takes "more pleasure in boys than in women" ("τοῖς παιδικοῖσι μᾶλλον ἢ τοῖς θήλεσιν", tois paidikoisi māllon ē tois thēlesin [l. 584]). Odysseus now decides to execute the next phase of his plan. The satyrs initially agreed to help, but later offer a variety of absurd excuses when the time for action comes. The annoyed Odysseus gets his crew to help instead and they blind the Cyclops (ll. 516–660).

As Odysseus had told the Cyclops earlier that his name was "Nobody" (οὔτις, outis), when the Cyclops screams who was responsible for blinding him, it sounds like he is saying that nothing is wrong ("Nobody blinded me", Οὖτίς με τυφλοῖ βλέφαρον, Outis me tuphloi blepharon [l. 673]), and the satyrs mock him over this. Once Odysseus and his men have escaped the cave, he reveals his true name and sets off, taking the willing satyrs with him. Meanwhile the Cyclops rushes to the mountain peak to try and sink the departing ship with boulders (ll. 661–707).

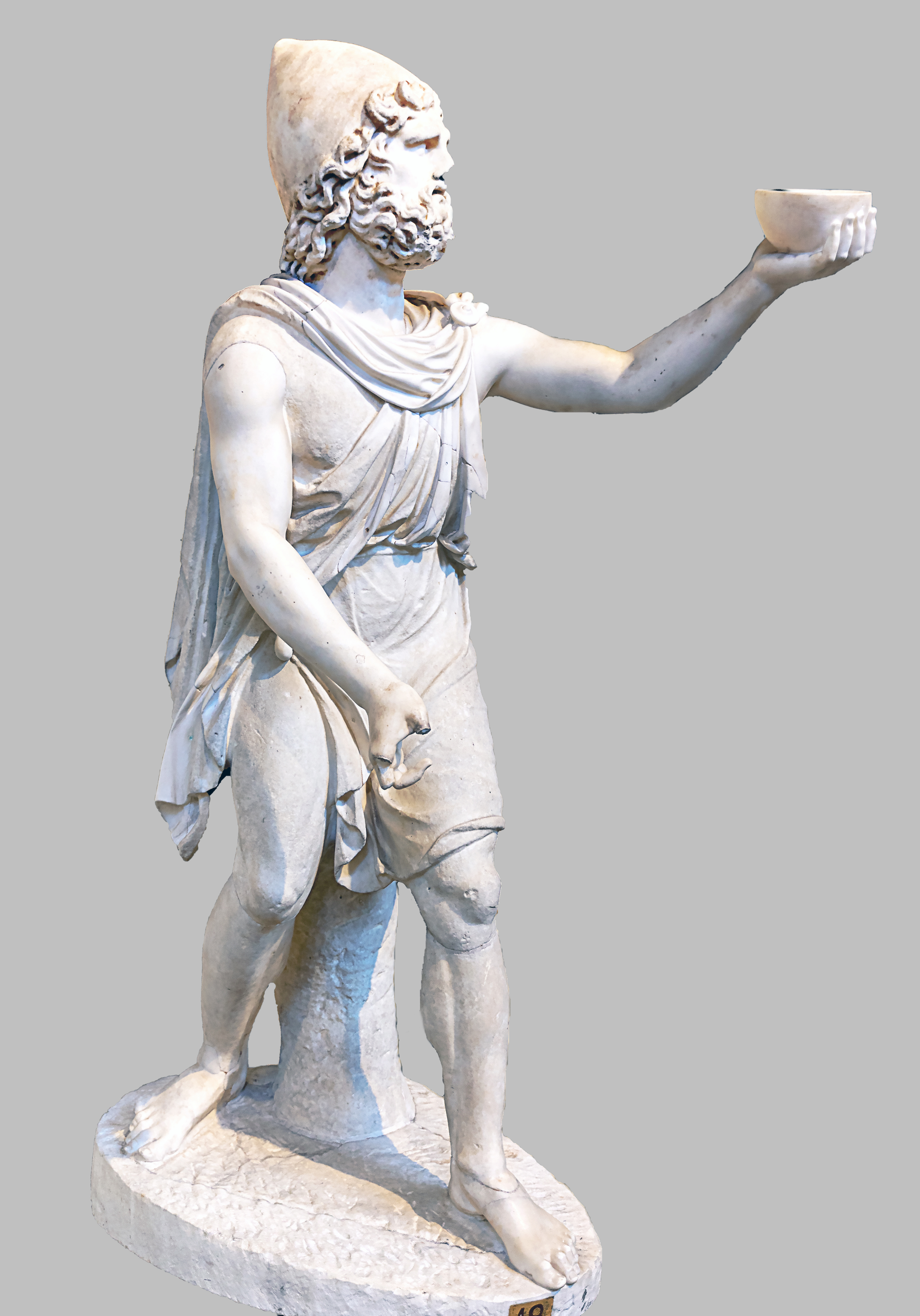
Odysseus offering wine to Polyphemus

== Analysis ==
Euripides is not the only ancient dramatist who wrote a Cyclops satyr play. Aristias of the early fifth century did also. But Cyclops is apparently the only play by Euripides with a particular Homeric foundation. Euripides' play combines the myth of Dionysus's capture by pirates with the episode in Homer's Odyssey of Odysseus' encounter with the cyclops Polyphemus. In this scenario Euripides inserts Silenus and the satyrs, comic characters.

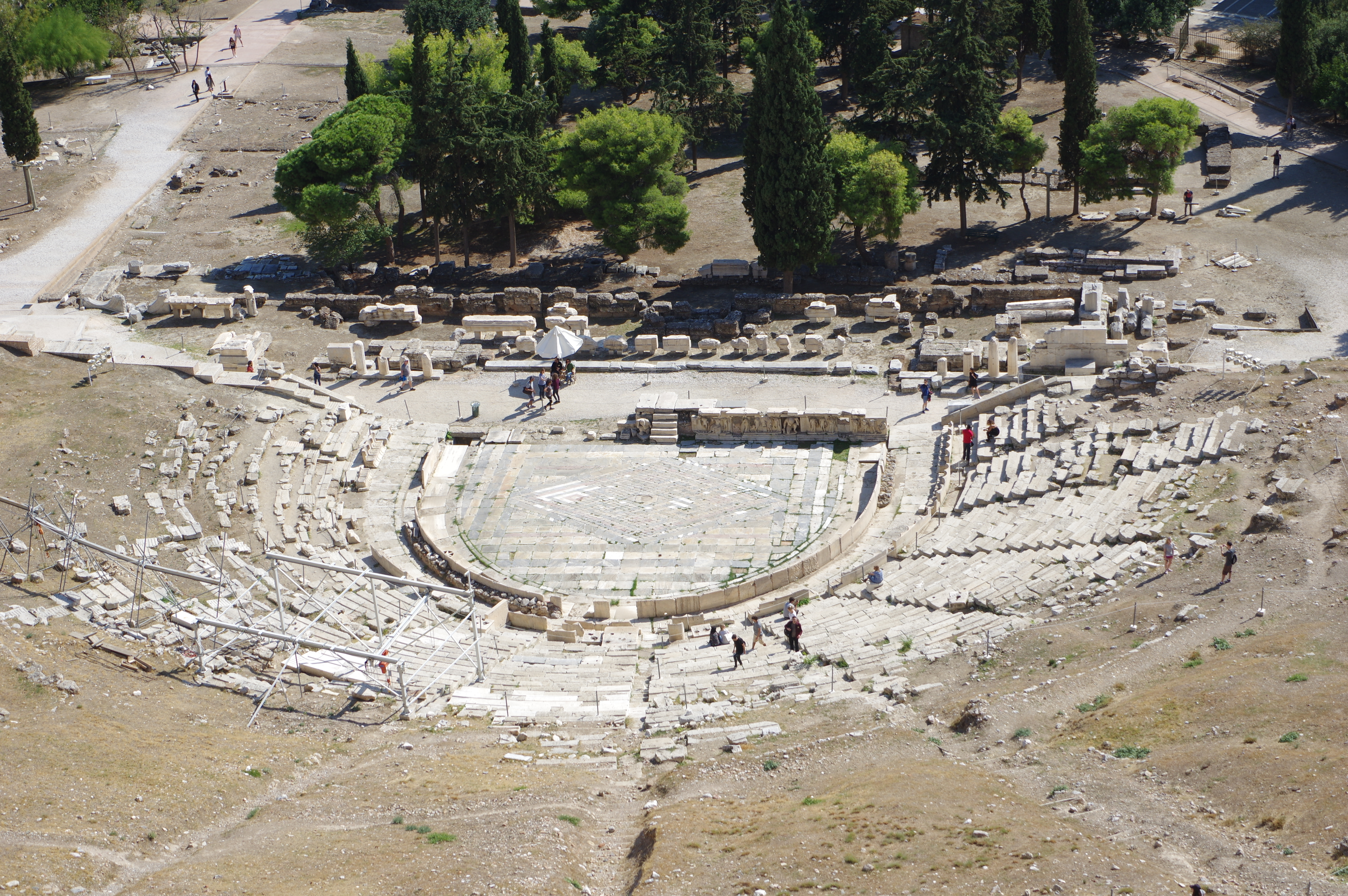
Theatre of Dionysus

The satyr play as a medium was generally understood as a "tragedy at play". It relied extensively on the multifarious connotations which surrounded the concepts of "playfulness (paidia), education (paideia), child (pais), slave (pais), playful (paidikos), and childishness (paidia)". In Cyclops Euripides employed "metapoetically loaded terms" like second and double and new to highlight interactions with his sources, familiar and foundational texts in Athenian education. The characters in Cyclops are not ignorant of Euripides' sources. "Silenus 'knows his Odyssey rather well'". Euripides' Cyclops knows about the Trojan War and gives Odysseus his opinion of it. By playing with metapoetic images throughout the play Euripides fostered "a collective consciousness" in his democratic audience and facilitated their recognition that cooperation was necessary throughout Athens if they were to overcome their enemies.

Both the Homeric episode and Euripides' Cyclops are based on the blinding of the Cyclops. It was almost certainly known by Euripides' audience that a particular Alcander had stuck a stick into the eye of Lycurgus the Spartan lawgiver. On one level of Euripides' play Alcibiades thrusts a stake into the eye of "a gross caricature of a Spartan", expressing "a shift of political alliances ostensibly achieved by Alcibiades". Like Sophocles' Philoctetes, Euripides' Cyclops made an appeal on behalf of Alcibiades that he be allowed to return from exile. Euripides also encouraged his audience to consider the recent Athenian enterprise against Sicily, which was undertaken for greed against an intractable and difficult enemy when Athens could barely provide money or men and which did not go well.

The Homeric Polyphemus is brutish and alien to Odysseus and his crew. Euripides' Polyphemus is sophisticated and intellectually analogous to sophists of the fifth century. The influence of the Sophists is manifest throughout Euripides' plays "not only in his rhetorical style but also in his skeptical, down‐to‐earth approach". In Cyclops both Odysseus and the Cyclops employ deft and appropriative rhetorical manipulation, "aggressive sophistry that reduces men to meat, and fine talk to deceptive barter".

Gluttonous ingestion is a theme and "[t]he imagery of grotesque ingestion surfaces almost immediately in the play". Euripides' Cyclops has been described as "a figure of proto-Rabelaisian excess" and linked to ideas contained in the work of Mikhail Bakhtin. Polyphemus "likes to talk, he likes to eat, [...] to talk about eating, or to try to eat those who talk to him". The Cyclops and the satyrs continually refer to the Cyclops' belly and the satisfaction thereof. Interaction between Odysseus and the Cyclops is based on food and exchange.

In the play the Cyclops suggests that people are the source of morality and not the gods. He says that he sacrifices only to his belly, the greatest of divinities. Such impiety was of substantial interest to Athenians in the fifth century. Euripides often dealt with "the consequences of impiety". One facet of Greek religion was "to honor and placate the gods because they are powerful". The Athenians judicially punished philosophers and sophists. Euripides himself may have left Athens in "self-imposed exile". But in his play his Cyclops is punished for impiety by having his eye burned out. In Euripides' plays, "Characters might refuse to worship certain gods, blaspheme them, or even at times question the morality of the gods, but there is little evidence of what we would call atheism, a complete lack of belief in any god, in Greek thought".

The location of the cyclopes in the Odyssey is not specified, but Euripides' Cyclops is set in Sicily, possibly following Epicharmus, portrayed as barbarous and desolate and hostile. This was not an accurate representation of Sicily. But the point is that the place is "completely non-Bacchic" and "non-Dionysiac". This is mentioned by every character in the play.

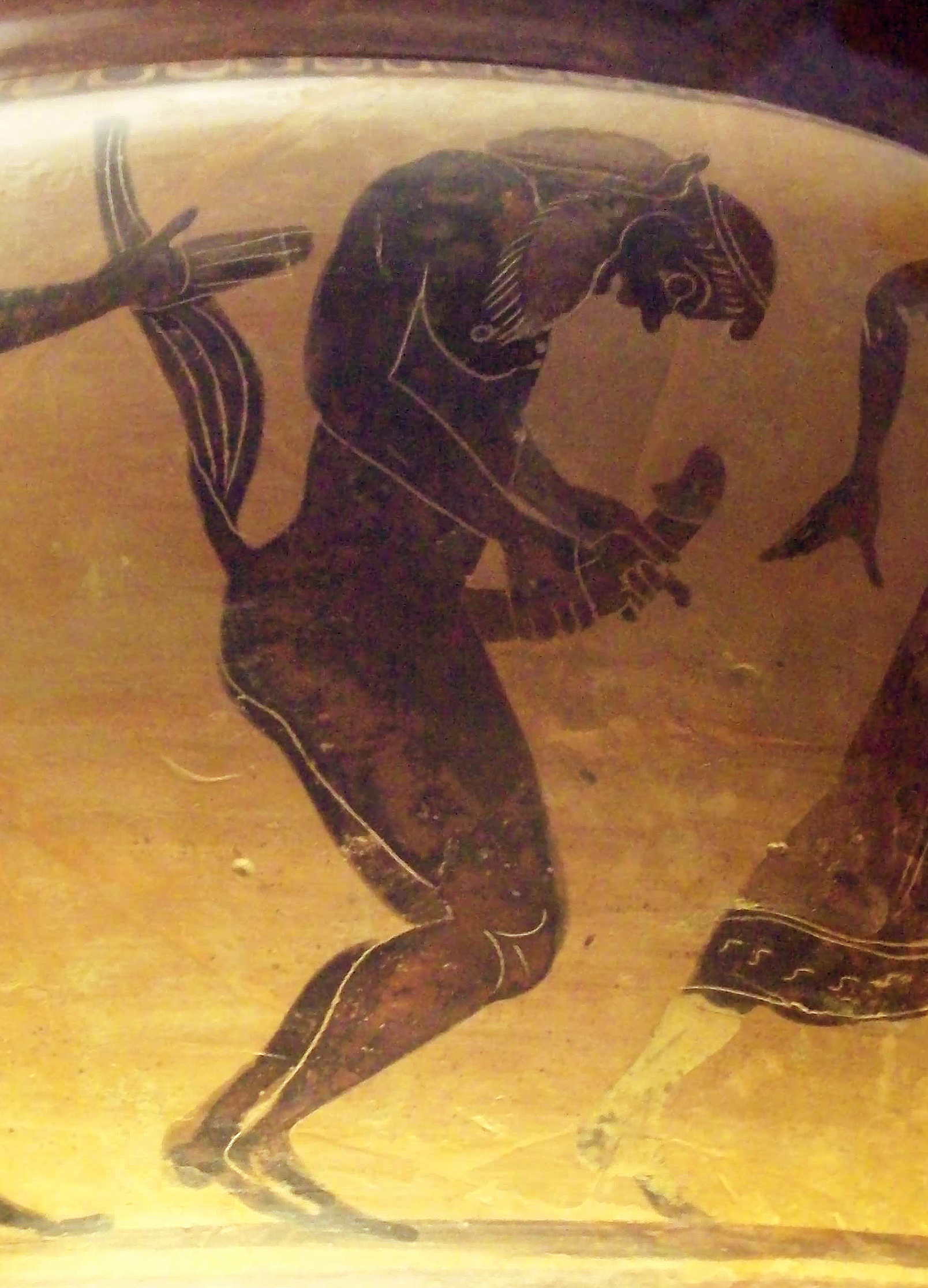
Detail of a krater, dating to c. 560–550 BC, showing a satyr masturbating. Athenian satyr plays were characterized as "a genre of 'hard-ons.'"

In Cyclops Polyphemus has captured and enslaved Silenus and a group of satyrs. The satyrs play an important role in driving the plot without any of them actually being the lead role, which, in the satyr play generally, was always reserved for a god or tragic hero (in this case Odysseus). According to Carl A. Shaw, the chorus of satyrs in a satyr play were "always trying to get a laugh with their animalistic, playfully rowdy, and, above all, sexual behavior." Satyrs were widely seen as mischief-makers who routinely played tricks on people and interfered with their personal property. They had insatiable sexual appetites and often sought to seduce or ravish both nymphs and mortal women alike (though not always successfully). A single elderly satyr named Silenus was believed to have been the tutor of Dionysus on Mount Nysa. After Dionysus grew to maturity, Silenus became one of his most devout followers and was perpetually drunk. The identity of satyrs is plastic and somewhat elusive, but a salient aspect in Cyclops is the "comic inversion of societal norms". They were overall "creatures that were funny and joyful, pleasing and delightful, feminine and masculine, but also cowardly and disgusting, pitiful and lamentable, terrifying and horrific". Satyrs were revered as semi-divine beings and companions of the god Dionysus. They were thought to possess their own kind of wisdom that was useful to humans if they could be convinced to share it.

In Cyclops the chorus "claim to know an incantation of Orpheus that will bring down a form of fiery destruction upon their enemy". When the satyrs identify the Cyclops as a "son of Earth" and present their firebrand as igniting the Cyclops' skull rather than his eye they mimic a traditional Orphic incantation and Zeus's punishment of the Titans, the "sons of Earth" and primordial enemies of the Orphic Dionysus. The central focus of Orphism is the suffering and death of the god Dionysus at the hands of the Titans, which forms the basis of Orphism's central myth. In the play the satyrs are devotees of Dionysus and on the island of Sicily, known to be "a center of Orphic cult".

Cyclops has been both lauded and scorned, with hostile commentators criticising its simplicity of plot and characterisation. There is little agreement. According to critics the play is derived entirely from the Homeric episode or mostly from the Homeric episode, is an interrogator of Homeric and tragic portrayals, or "a rival version of a Homeric episode with new contemporary implications."

== Translations ==
- Percy Bysshe Shelley, 1819 (published 1824) – verse (full text at Google Books or on Wikisource.)
- Edward P. Coleridge, 1891 – prose (full text from MIT Classics)
- Arthur S. Way, 1912 – verse
- J. T. Sheppard, 1923 – verse
- William Arrowsmith, 1956 - verse
- Roger Lancelyn Green, 1957 – verse
- David Kovacs, 1994 – prose (full text on Tufts Perseus)
- Heather McHugh and David Konstan, 2001 – verse
- George Theodoridis, 2008 – prose (full text at Bacchicstage Wordpress)
- Patrick O'Sullivan and Christopher Collard, 2013 (full text on Academia.edu)
- Brian Vinero, 2013: rhymed verse

== See also ==
- Ancient Greek literature
- Ancient Greek religion
- Classical Greece
- Dionysia
- Dionysian Mysteries
- Music of ancient Greece
- Theatre of ancient Greece
