= Dionysia =

Festivals of Dionysus in ancient Athens

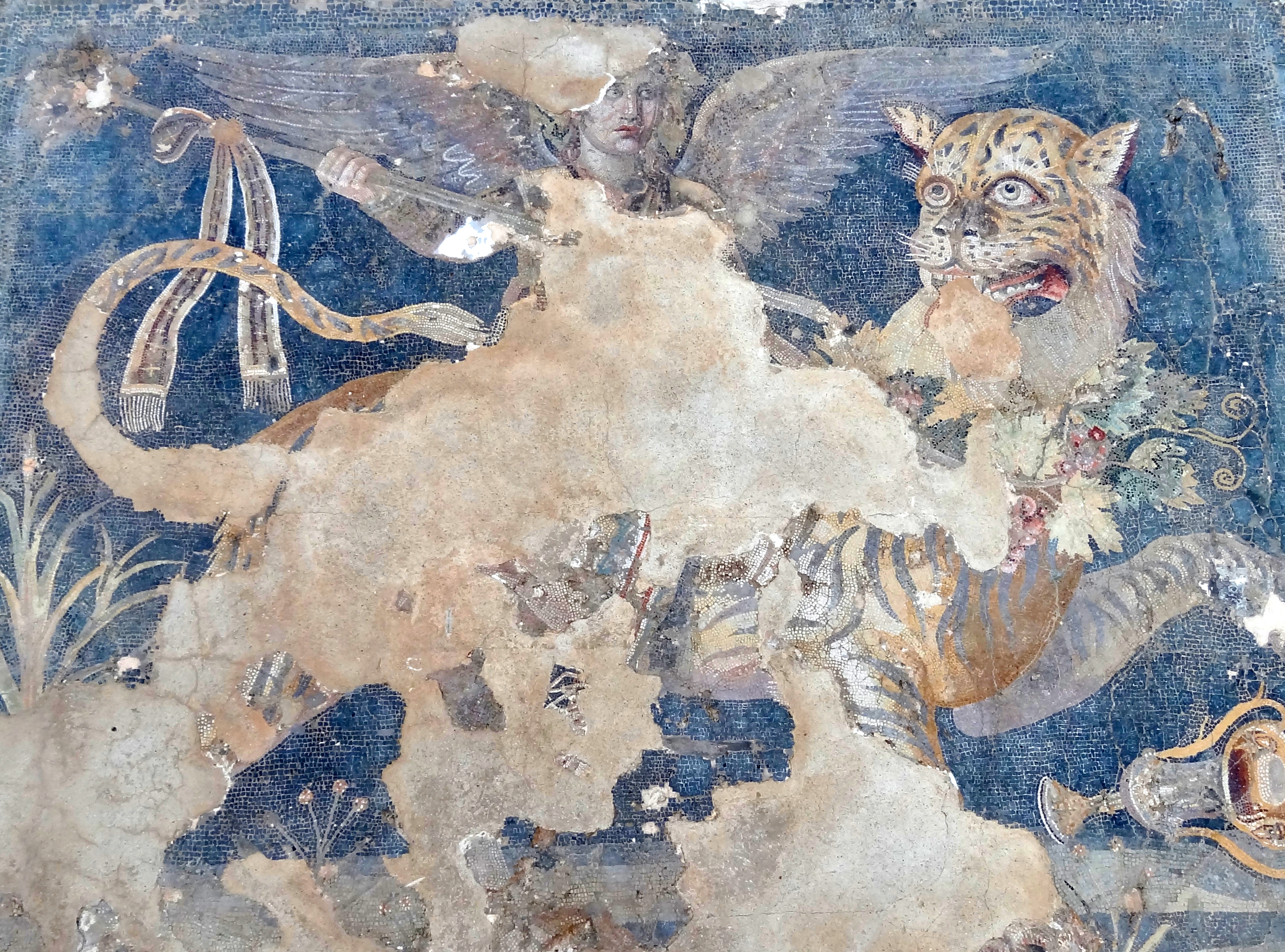
A Hellenistic Greek mosaic depicting the god Dionysos as a winged daimon riding on a tiger, from the House of Dionysos at Delos (which was once controlled by Athens) in the South Aegean region of Greece, late 2nd century BC, Archaeological Museum of Delos

The Dionysia (/ˌdaɪ.əˈnɪzi.ə, ˌdaɪ.əˈnɪʃi.ə, ˌdaɪ.əˈnɪʃə/; Greek: Διονύσια) was a large festival in ancient Athens in honor of the god Dionysus, the central events of which were processions and sacrifices in honor of Dionysus, the theatrical performances of dramatic tragedies and, from 487 BC, comedies. It was the second-most important festival after the Panathenaia. The Dionysia actually consisted of two related festivals, the Rural Dionysia and the City Dionysia, which took place in different parts of the year.

== Rural Dionysia ==
=== Origins ===
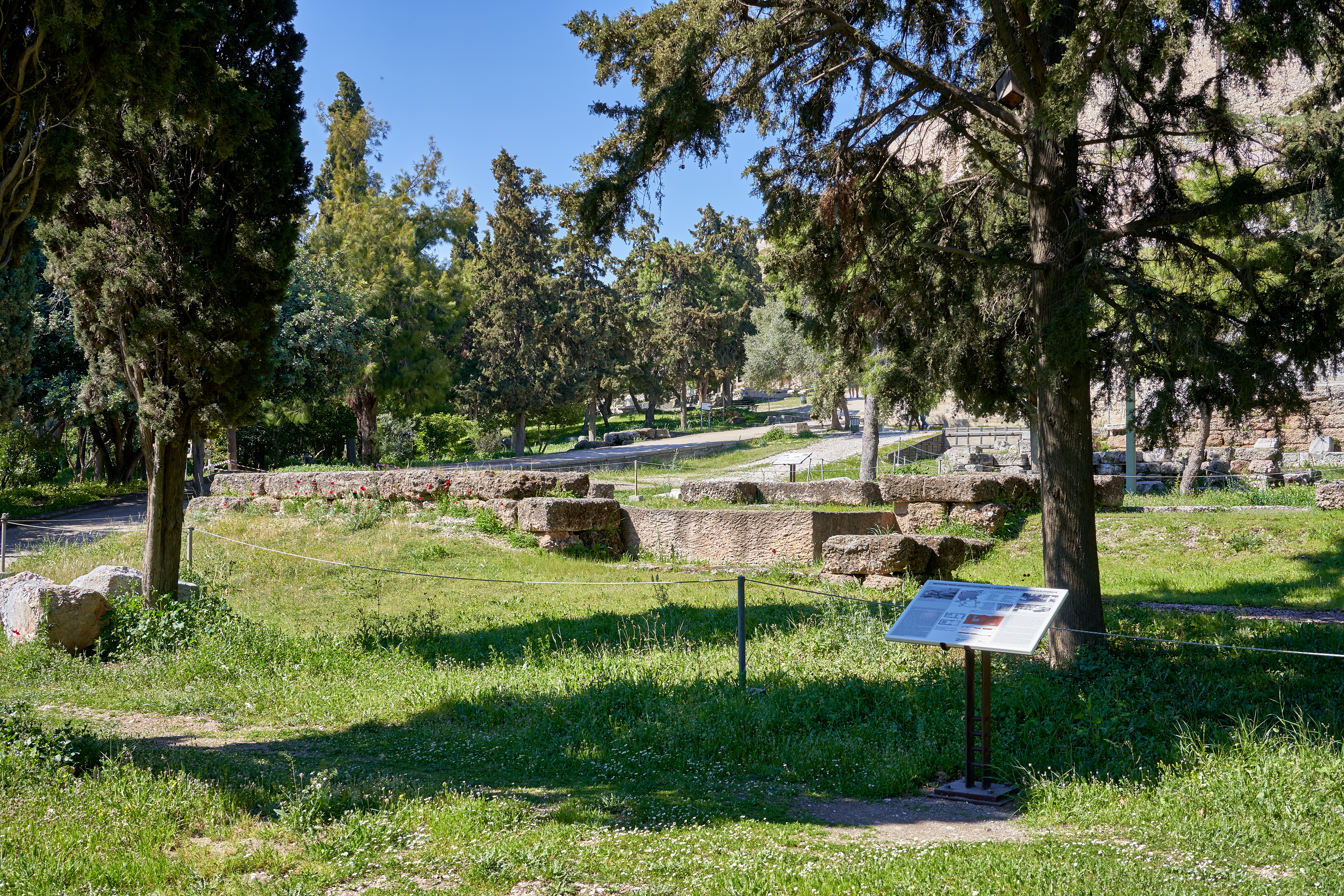
Ruins of a 6th century BC Temple of Dionysus in Eleutherae, where the Cult of Dionysus and the Rural Dionysia was originally founded

The Dionysia was originally a rural festival in Eleutherae, Attica (Διονύσια τὰ κατ' ἀγρούς – Dionysia ta kat' agrous), celebrating the cultivation of vines. Archaeological evidence suggests that theatres for the Rural Dionysia had been constructed as early as the 6th century BCE, but the festival is generally believed to have been celebrated even before that. This "rural Dionysia" was held during the winter, in the month of Poseideon (the month straddling the winter solstice, i.e., Dec.–Jan.), although it is also suggested that festivals took place in the Spring time as well. The central event was the pompe (πομπή), the procession, in which phalloi (φαλλοί) were carried by phallophoroi (φαλλοφόροι). Also participating in the pompe were kanephoroi (κανηφόροι – young girls carrying baskets), obeliaphoroi (ὀβελιαφόροι – who carried long loaves of bread), skaphephoroi (σκαφηφόροι – who carried other offerings), hydriaphoroi (ὑδριαφόροι – who carried jars of water), and askophoroi (ἀσκοφόροι – who carried goatskin bags of wine).

After the pompe procession was completed, there were contests of dancing and singing, and choruses (led by a choregos) would perform dithyrambs. Some festivals may have included dramatic performances, possibly of the tragedies and comedies that had been produced at the City Dionysia the previous year. This was more common in the larger towns, such as Piraeus, Eleusis and Icaria/Ikarion.

The festival was celebrated in urban towns outside of the rural setting such as in Kollytos and Peiraieus, indicating that it became less of a celebration of rural communities and more so a celebration of agrarian culture as a whole. Because the various towns in Attica held their festivals on different days, it was possible for spectators to visit more than one festival per season. It was also an opportunity for Athenian citizens to travel outside the city if they did not have the opportunity to do so during the rest of the year. This also allowed travelling companies of actors to perform in more than one town during the period of the festival.

=== References ===
The comic playwright Aristophanes parodied the Rural Dionysia in his play The Acharnians by making a mockery of the pompe and the significance of phalluses. His description is considered the earliest surviving documentation of the festival in Athens and has been used as a reference on its proceedings. Plutarch in his treatise De cupiditate divitiarum, commented on the simple nature of the celebration of Rural Dionysia in antiquity. Aeschines makes reference to the performance of comedies during the Rural Dionysia in Kollytos in his speech Against Timarchus. The festival has also been mentioned in writing by Theophrastus in Adoleschia, Plutarch additionally in Moralia, and in Plato's Republic.

== City Dionysia ==
=== Origins ===
The City Dionysia (Dionysia ta en Astei – Διονύσια τὰ ἐν Ἄστει, also known as the Great Dionysia, Dionysia ta Megala – Διονύσια τὰ Μεγάλα) was the urban part of the festival. It was established during the tyranny of Peisistratus in the 6th century BC due to his recognition of the Cult of Dionysius as a national cult, the promotion of performing arts, and the reformation of the festival. This festival was held probably from the 10th to the 16th of the month Elaphebolion (the lunar month straddling the vernal equinox, i.e., Mar.-Apr in the solar calendar), three months after the rural Dionysia, probably to celebrate the end of winter and the harvesting of the year's crops. According to tradition, the festival was established after Eleutherae, a town on the border between Attica and Boeotia, had chosen to become part of Attica. The Eleuthereans brought a statue of Dionysus to Athens, which was initially rejected by the Athenians. Dionysus then punished the Athenians with a plague affecting the male genitalia, which was cured when the Athenians accepted the cult of Dionysus. This was recalled each year by a procession of citizens carrying phalloi. This story relates to the original founding of the cult of Dionysus in Eleutherae in the 6th century BC, a myth that also involves the rejection, punishment, and acceptance of Dionysus

The urban festival was a relatively recent invention. This ceremony fell under the auspices of the Archons of Athens, rather than the basileus, to whom religious festivals were given when the office of archon was created in the 7th century BC.

=== Pompe and Proagon ===
The archon prepared for the City Dionysia as soon as he was elected, by choosing his two páredroi (πάρεδροι, "reeves", literally: "by the chair") and ten epimelētai (ἐπιμεληταί, "curators") to help organize the festival. On the first day of the festival, the pompē ("pomp", "procession") was held, in which citizens, metics, and representatives from Athenian colonies marched to the Theatre of Dionysus on the southern slope of the Acropolis, carrying the wooden statue of Dionysus Eleuthereus, the "leading" or eisagōgē (εἰσαγωγή, "introduction"). As with the Rural Dionysia, they also carried phalloi, made of wood or bronze, aloft on poles, and a cart pulled a much larger phallus. Basket-carriers and water and wine-carriers participated in the pompe here, as in the Rural Dionysia.

During the height of the Athenian Empire in the mid-5th century BC, various gifts and weapons showcasing Athens' strength were carried as well. Also included in the procession were bulls to be sacrificed in the theatre. The most conspicuous members of the procession were the chorēgoí (χορηγοί, "sponsors", literally: "chorus leaders"), who were dressed in the most expensive and ornate clothing. After the pompē, the chorēgoí led their choruses in the dithyrambic competitions. These were extremely competitive, and the best flute players and celebrity poets (such as Simonides and Pindar) offered their musical and lyrical services. After these competitions, the bulls were sacrificed, and a feast was held for all the citizens of Athens. A second procession, the kōmos (κῶμος), occurred afterwards, which was most likely a drunken revelry through the streets.

The next day, the playwrights announced the titles of the plays to be performed, and judges were selected by lot: the "proagōn" (προαγών, "pre-contest"). It is unknown where the proagōn originally took place, but after the mid-5th century BC, it was held in the Odeon of Pericles on the foot of Acropolis. The proagōn was also used to give praise to notable citizens, or often foreigners, who had served Athens in some beneficial way during the year. During the Peloponnesian War, orphaned children of those who had been killed in battle were also paraded in the Odeon, possibly to honour their fathers. The proagōn could be used for other announcements as well; in 406 BC the death of the playwright Euripides was announced there.

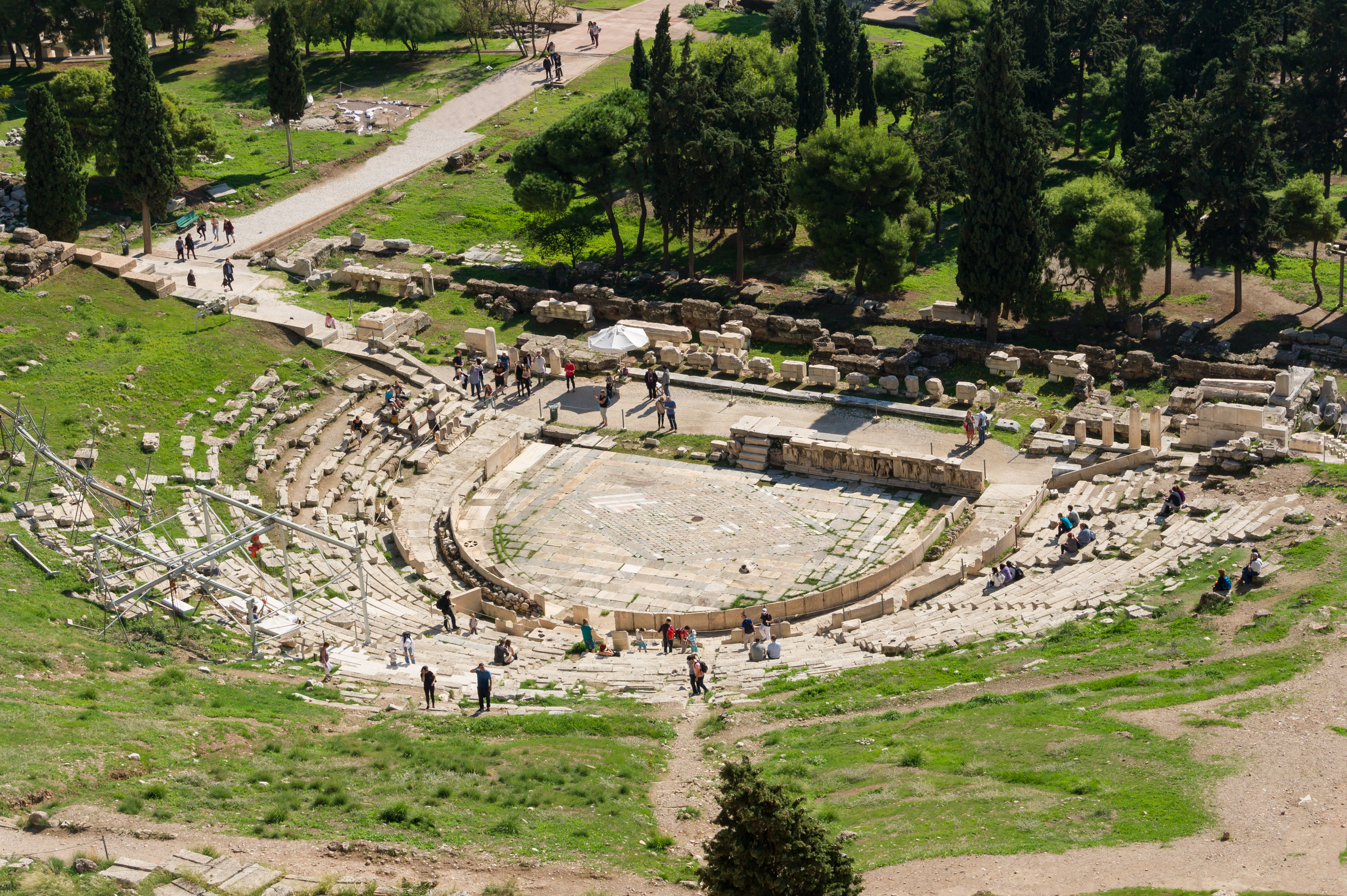
Theatre of Dionysus in Athens where dramatic performances for the Dionysia took place. It is generally considered to be one of the oldest theatres in the world.

=== Dramatic performances ===
Following the pompe, the Theatre of Dionysus was purified by the sacrifice of a bull. According to tradition, the first performance of tragedy at the Dionysia was by the playwright and actor Thespis (from whom we take the word "thespian") in 534 BC. His award was reportedly a goat, a common symbol for Dionysus, and this "prize" possibly suggests the origin of the word "tragedy" (which means "goat-song").

During the fifth century BC, five days of the festival were set aside for performance, though scholars disagree exactly what was presented each day. At least three full days were devoted to tragic plays, and each of three playwrights presented his set of three tragedies and one satyr play on the successive days. Most of the extant Greek tragedies, including those of Aeschylus, Euripides, and Sophocles, were performed at the Theatre of Dionysus. The archons, epimeletai, and judges (agonothetai – ἀγωνοθἐται) watched from the front row.

The other two days of the festival were likely devoted to dithyrambic contests until 487/6 BC, when comic poets were officially admitted to the agons and eligible for their own prizes. Each of five comic writers presented a single play (except during the Peloponnesian War, when only three plays were performed), though it is unknown whether they were performed continuously on one day, or over the course of the five-day festival. Until 449 BC, only dramatic works were awarded prizes in the agon, but after that time, actors also became eligible for recognition. It was considered a great honour to win the comedic prize at the City Dionysia, despite the belief that comedies were of secondary importance. The Lenaia festival, held earlier in the year, featured comedy more prominently and officially recognized comic performances with prizes in 442 BC.

Impressive tragic output continued without pause through the first three quarters of the fourth century BC, and some scholars consider this time a continuation of the classical period. Though much of the work of this period is either lost or forgotten, it is considered to owe a great debt to the playwright Euripides. His plays, along with other fifth-century BC writers, were often re-staged during this period. At least one revival was presented each year at City Dionysia. It has been suggested that audiences may have preferred to see well-known plays re-staged, rather than financially support new plays of questionable quality; or alternately, that revivals represented a nostalgia for the glory of Athens from before the devastation of the Peloponnesian War. Nevertheless, plays continued to be written and performed until the 2nd century BC, when new works of both comedy and tragedy seem to have been eliminated. After that point drama continued to be produced, but prizes were awarded to wealthy producers and famous actors rather than the long-dead playwrights whose work was being performed.

Another procession and celebration was held on the final day, when the judges chose the winners of the tragedy and comedy performances. The winning playwrights were awarded a wreath of ivy.

== Known winners of the City Dionysia ==
Most of our knowledge of the winners of the City Dionysia and the Lenaea festival comes from a series of damaged inscriptions referred to as the Fasti (IG II^{2} 2318), the Didascaliae (IG II^{2} 2319-24) and the Victors Lists (IG II^{2} 2325).

=== Tragedy ===
(? = exact year not preserved)

- Pre 484 - Thespis (?), Choerilus, Phrynichus, Pratinas
- 484 BC - Aeschylus
- 4?? BC - Euetes
- 472 BC - Aeschylus (The Persians)
- 471 BC - Polyphrasmon
- 4?? BC - Nothippus
- 468 BC - Sophocles (Triptolemus)
- 467 BC - Aeschylus (Seven Against Thebes); Aristias took 2nd place
- 4?? BC - Mesatus
- 463 BC - Aeschylus (The Suppliants)
- 460 BC - Aristias
- 458 BC - Aeschylus (The Oresteia); Sophocles took 2nd place
- 449 BC - Herakleides
- 44? BC - Sophocles (Antigone).
- 441 BC - Euripides
- 438 BC - Sophocles; Euripides took 2nd place with Alcestis
- 431 BC - Euphorion, son of Aeschylus; Sophocles took 2nd place; Euripides took 3rd with Medea
- 428 BC - Euripides (Hippolytus)
- 427 BC - Philocles, nephew of Aeschylus; Sophocles took 2nd place with Oedipus Rex
- 416 BC - Agathon
- 415 BC - Xenocles
- 409 BC - Sophocles (Philoctetes)
- 405 BC - Euripides (The Bacchae, Iphigenia in Aulis, Alcmaeon in Corinth)
- 401 BC - Sophocles (Oedipus at Colonus (posthumous award)
- 372 BC - Astydamas
- 3?? BC - Aphareus

=== Comedy ===
(? = exact year not preserved)

- 486 BC - Chionides
- 472 BC - Magnes
- 458 BC - Euphonius
- 450 BC - Crates
- 446 BC - Callias
- 43? BC - Cratinus
- 437 BC - Pherecrates
- 435 BC - Hermippus
- 427 BC - Unknown; Aristophanes took 2nd place with The Banqueters
- 426 BC - Aristophanes (The Babylonians)
- 423 BC - Cratinus (The Wicker Flask)
- 422 BC - Cantharus
- 421 BC - Eupolis (The Flatterers); Aristophanes took 2nd place with Peace
- 414 BC - Ameipsias (The Revelers); Aristophanes took 2nd place with The Birds; Phrynichus took 3rd place with Solitary
- 410 BC - Plato the Comic
- 402 BC - Cephisodoros
- 290 BC - Poseidippus
- 278 BC - Philemon
- 185 BC - Laines
- 183 BC - Philemon
- 154 BC - Chairion

== Modern adaptations ==
The festival has inspired people through the present day, as a celebration of humanity (see Nietzsche's or Aristotle's take) and an exposition of culture. The University of Houston's Center for Creative works produces and performs an adaptation each spring. The purpose of the enterprise is to educate and entertain, and adaptations occasionally go beyond Greek theater for inspiration (for example, the 2013 Spring adaptation of the Iliad, titled Ilium). Collaborators flock from all over America and the productions themselves are quite popular, selling out on all ticketed venues.

The New York Classical Club, through Fordham University's Classics Department, stages a competition every April wherein groups of high school students produce unique adaptations of the same play. The competition aims to engage the themes and style of the ancient plays with renewed vigor and an accessible, thought provoking frame. Several notable schools from the area participate, including Stuyvesant and Regis. Adaptations are cut to twenty minutes, and source plays have included The Bacchae by Euripides and the entire collection of Ovid's Metamorphoses.

Educational charity The Iris Project holds a Dionysia Festival every year with Year Eight students from Cheney School, who adapt and modernise Aristophanes plays. The festival is usually hosted at Corpus Christi College, Oxford. Modern followers of Hellenism celebrate Dionysia as a holiday and use a version of the Attic calendar to calculate it.

== See also ==
- Athenian festivals
- Anthesteria
- Bacchanalia
- Ganachakra
- Lenaia
- Panathenaia

== Sources ==
- Aristophanes, The Acharnians.
- Plutarch, De cupiditate divitiarum
- Thucidides, History of the Peloponnesian War
- Simon Goldhill, "The Great Dionysia and Civic Ideology", in Nothing to Do with Dionysos? Athenian Drama in Its Social Context, eds. John J. Winkler and Froma I. Zeitlin. Princeton: Princeton University Press, 1990. ISBN 0-691-06814-3
- Susan Guettel Cole, "Procession and Celebration at the Dionysia", in Theater and Society in the Classical World, ed. Ruth Scodel. Ann Arbor: University of Michigan Press, 1993. ISBN 0-472-10281-8
- Jeffrey M. Hurwit. The Athenian Acropolis: History, Mythology, and Archaeology From the Neolithic Era to the Present. Cambridge: Cambridge University Press, 1999. ISBN 0-521-42834-3
- Mikalson, Jon D. (1975), The Sacred and Civil Calendar of the Athenian Year, Princeton University Press. ISBN 0691035458.
- Millis, Benjamin Willard; Olson, S. Douglas (2012). Inscriptional records for the dramatic festivals in Athens: IG II2 2318-2325 and related texts. Leiden Boston: Brill. p. 1. ISBN 978-90-04-23201-3.
- Sir Arthur Pickard-Cambridge. The Dramatic Festivals of Athens. Oxford: Clarendon Press, 1953 (2nd ed. 1968). ISBN 0-19-814258-7
- Robert Parker. Athenian religion: A History. Oxford: Oxford University Press, 1996. ISBN 0-19-814979-4
- Carl A. P. Ruck. IG II 2323: The List of the Victors in Comedies at the Dionysia. Leiden: E.J. Brill, 1967.
- Goette, Hans Rupprecht et al. "The Archaeology of the 'Rural' Dionysia in Attica." Greek Theatre in the Fourth Century BC. Berlin, Boston: DE GRUYTER, 2014. 77–106. Web.
- Belknap, George N. "The Date of Dicaeopolis' Rural Dionysia." The Journal of Hellenic Studies, vol. 54, 1934, pp. 77–78. JSTOR, https://doi.org/10.2307/626492.
- Jones, Nicholas F. Rural Athens under the Democracy. 1st ed. Philadelphia: University of Pennsylvania Press, 2004. Web.
- Shapiro, H. A. 1989. Art and Cult under the Tyrants in Athens. Mainz am Rhein
- BEDNAREK, BARTŁOMIEJ. "The (Alleged) Sacrifice and Procession at Rural Dionysia in Aristophanes' 'Acharnians.'" Hermes, vol. 147, no. 2, 2019, pp. 143–52. JSTOR
- Warford, Erin. The Multipolar Polis: A Study of Processions in Classical Athens and the Attica Countryside, State University of New York at Buffalo, United States -- New York, 2015.
