= Aristias =

Ancient Greek playwright

Aristias (Ancient Greek: Ἀριστίας), son of Pratinas, was a dramatic poet of ancient Greece whose tomb Pausanias saw at Phlius, and whose satyric dramas, with those of his father, were considered to be surpassed only by those of Aeschylus. Aristias is mentioned in the life of Sophocles as one of the poets with whom the latter contended. Besides two dramas, which were undoubtedly satyr plays, the Keres (Κῆρες) and Cyclops, Aristias wrote three others, Antaeus, Orpheus, and Atalante, which may have been tragedies.
