= Alcander =

Spartan who wounded Lycurgus, but was pardoned

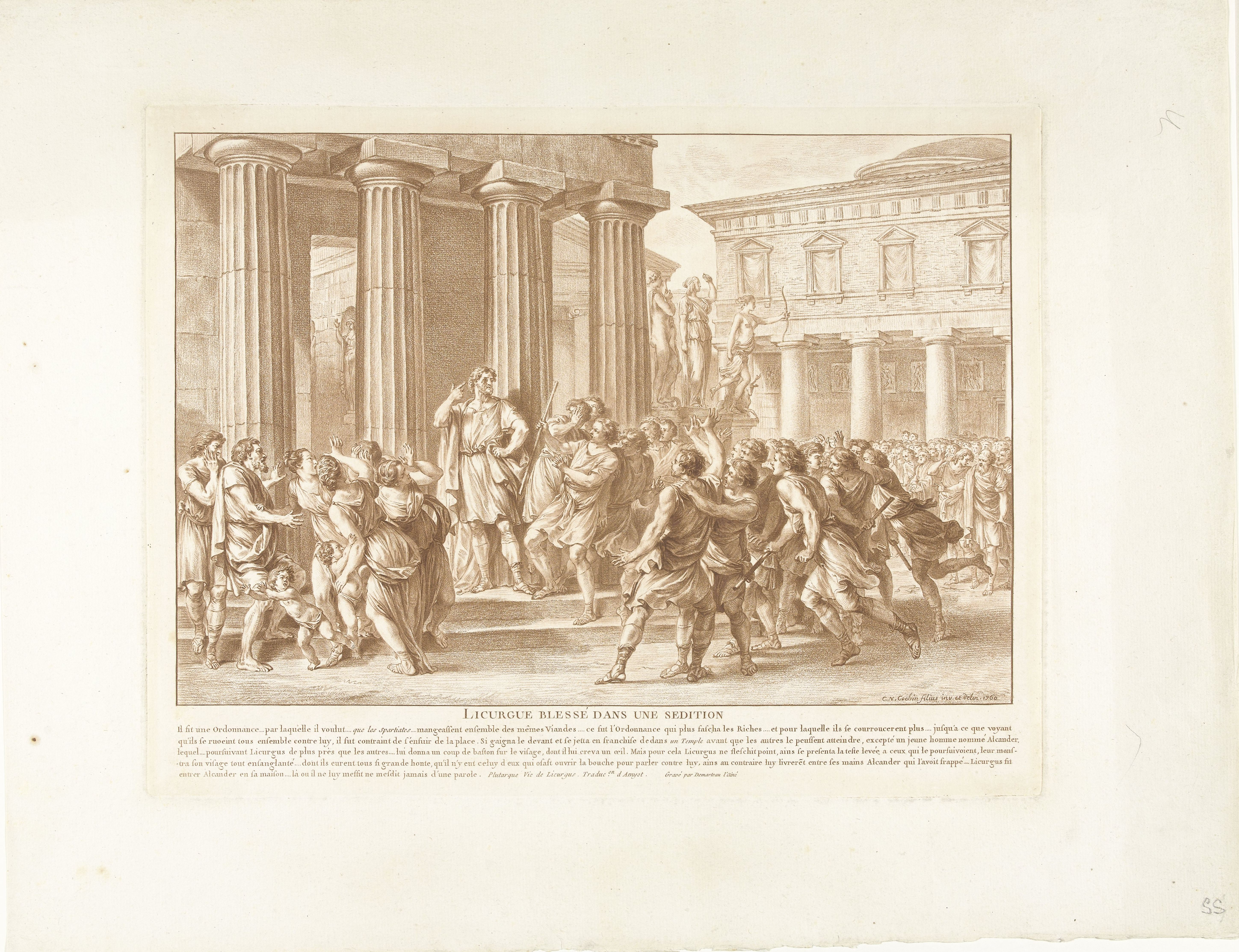
Lycurgus shows the wound to his eye inflicted by the young Alcander (after Charles-Nicolas Cochin)

Alcander (Gr. Ἄλκανδρος) was a young man of Sparta who attacked Lycurgus and stabbed out one of his eyes when his fellow-citizens were discontented with the laws he proposed. Lycurgus' mangled face, however, produced shame and repentance in his enemies, and they delivered up Alcander to him to be punished as he thought fit. Lycurgus pardoned his outrage, and thus converted him into one of his warmest friends. He died of hunger after being banished.
