= Pratinas =

Ancient Greek tragic poet

Pratinas (/ˈprætɪnəs/; Ancient Greek: Πρατίνας) was one of the early tragic poets who flourished at Athens at the beginning of the fifth century BCE, and whose combined efforts were thought by critics to have brought the art to its perfection.

== Life ==
He was a native of Phlius in Peloponnese, and was therefore by birth a Dorian. His father's name was Pyrrhonides or Encomius. It is not known at what time he went to Athens, but we find him exhibiting there, in competition with Choerilus and Aeschylus, around the 70th Olympiad, that is, 500–499 BCE, the year of Aeschylus's debut.

== Works ==
The main innovation that ancient critics ascribed to Pratinas was the separation of the satyric from the tragic drama. Pratinas is frequently credited as having introduced satyr plays as a species of entertainment distinct from tragedy, in which the rustic merry-makings and the extravagant dances of the satyrs were retained. The change preserved a highly characteristic feature of the older form of tragedy, the entire rejection of which would have met with serious obstacles, not only from the popular taste, but from religious associations, and yet preserved it in such a manner as, while developing its own capabilities, to set free the tragic drama from certain of its genre constraints.

A band of Satyrs, as the companions of Dionysus, formed the original chorus of tragedy; and their jests and frolics were interspersed with the more serious action of the drama, without causing any more sense of incongruity than is felt in the reading of those humorous passages of Homer, from which Aristotle traces the origin of the satyric drama and of comedy. As however tragedy came to be separated more and more from any reference to Dionysus, and the whole of the heroic mythology was included in its range of subjects, the chorus of Satyrs came to be seen as impracticable and absurd, and at the same time the humorous element, which formed an essential part of the character of the chorus of Satyrs, became more and more incongruous with the earnest spirit of the higher tragic dramas.

It is easy to enter into the fun of the Prometheus the Fire-kindler, where an old Satyr singes his beard in attempting to embrace the beautiful fire; but it is hard to fancy what the poet could have done with a chorus of Satyrs, in place of the ocean nymphs, in the Prometheus Bound. The innovation of Pratinas at once relieved tragedy of this problem, and gave the Satyrs a free stage for themselves; where, by treating the same class of subjects on which the tragedies were founded, in a totally different spirit, the poet not only preserved a popular feature of his art (the old chorus), but also presented stories that audiences found, for lack of a better word, fun.

It has been suggested by some writers that Pratinas cultivated the satyric drama out of fear of being eclipsed by Aeschylus in tragedy. Others disagree and observe that the early life of Pratinas would very probably imbue him with a taste for that kind of the drama; for his native city, Phlius, was the neighbor of Sicyon, the home of those "tragic choruses", on the strength of which the Dorians claimed to be the inventors of tragedy. It was adjacent also to Corinth, where the cyclic choruses of Satyrs, which were ascribed to Arion, had been long established.

== Reputation ==
This innovation of Pratinas was adopted by his contemporaries; but Pratinas is distinguished by the large proportion of his satyric dramas. He composed, according to the Suda, fifty plays, of which thirty-two were Satyr plays. Böckh, however, from an alternate reading of the Suda, assigns to Pratinas only twelve satyric dramas, thus leaving a sufficient number of tragedies to make three for every satyric drama, that is, twelve tetralogies and two single plays. In merit, the satyric dramas of Pratinas were considered the best ever written by his contemporaries, except only those of Aeschylus.

Pratinas ranked high among the lyric, as well as the dramatic poets of his age. He also wrote dithyrambs and the choral odes called hyporchemata, and a considerable fragment of one of these is preserved in Athenaeus. Hyporcheme was closely related to the satyric drama by the humorous character which it often assumed, and dithyrambs by its ancient choruses of Satyrs. Pratinas may perhaps be considered to have shared with his contemporary Lasus of Hermione the honor of founding the Athenian school of dithyrambic poetry. Some interesting fragments of his hyporchemes are preserved, especially a considerable passage in Athenaeus which gives an important indication of the contest for supremacy which was then going on both between poetry and music, and between the different kinds of music. The poet complains that the voices of the singers were overpowered by the noise of the flutes, and expresses his desire to replace the prevailing Phrygian scales then commonly used with the Dorian. It is impossible to say how much of his lyric poetry was separate from his dramas; in which, both from the age at which he lived, and from express testimony, we know that great importance was assigned not only to the songs, but also to the dances of the chorus. Athenaeus mentions him as one of the poets who were called "orchestikoi" (ὀρχηστικοί), from the large part which the choral dances bore in their dramas.

== Family ==
His son Aristias was also highly distinguished for his satyric plays, and a monument was erected by the inhabitants of Phlius in honor of him.
