= Choerilus (playwright) =

Ancient Athenian writer of tragedies

Choerilus (Ancient Greek: Χοιρίλος) was an Athenian tragic poet, who exhibited plays as early as 524 BC.

Choerilus started writing tragedies when he was 22 years old. He staged 160 plays and won the prize 13 times. His works are all lost; only Pausanias mentions a play by him entitled Alope (a mythological personage who was the subject of dramas by Euripides and Carcinus). He lived in Athens for most of his life.

== Biography ==
Choerilus was said to have competed with Aeschylus, Pratinas and even Sophocles. According to Friedrich Gottlieb Welcker, however, the rival of Sophocles was a son of Choerilus, who bore the same name. His reputation as a writer of satyr plays is attested in the line:

ἡνίκα μὲν Βασιλεὺς ἦν Χοιρίλος ἐν Σατύροις.
Back in the days when old Choerilus over the Satyrs was king.

The Choerilean metre (a catalectic hexameter), mentioned by the Latin grammarians, is probably so called because the above line is the oldest extant specimen. Choerilus was also said to have introduced considerable improvements in theatrical masks and costumes.

== Sources ==
- In this article, he is the first poet of this name discussed. This article cites:
  - A. Nauck (1889). Tragicorum Graecorum Fragmenta.
  - F. G. Welcker. Die griechischen Tragödien. pp. 18, 892.
