= Satyr play =

Attic theatre performance related to both comedy and tragedy

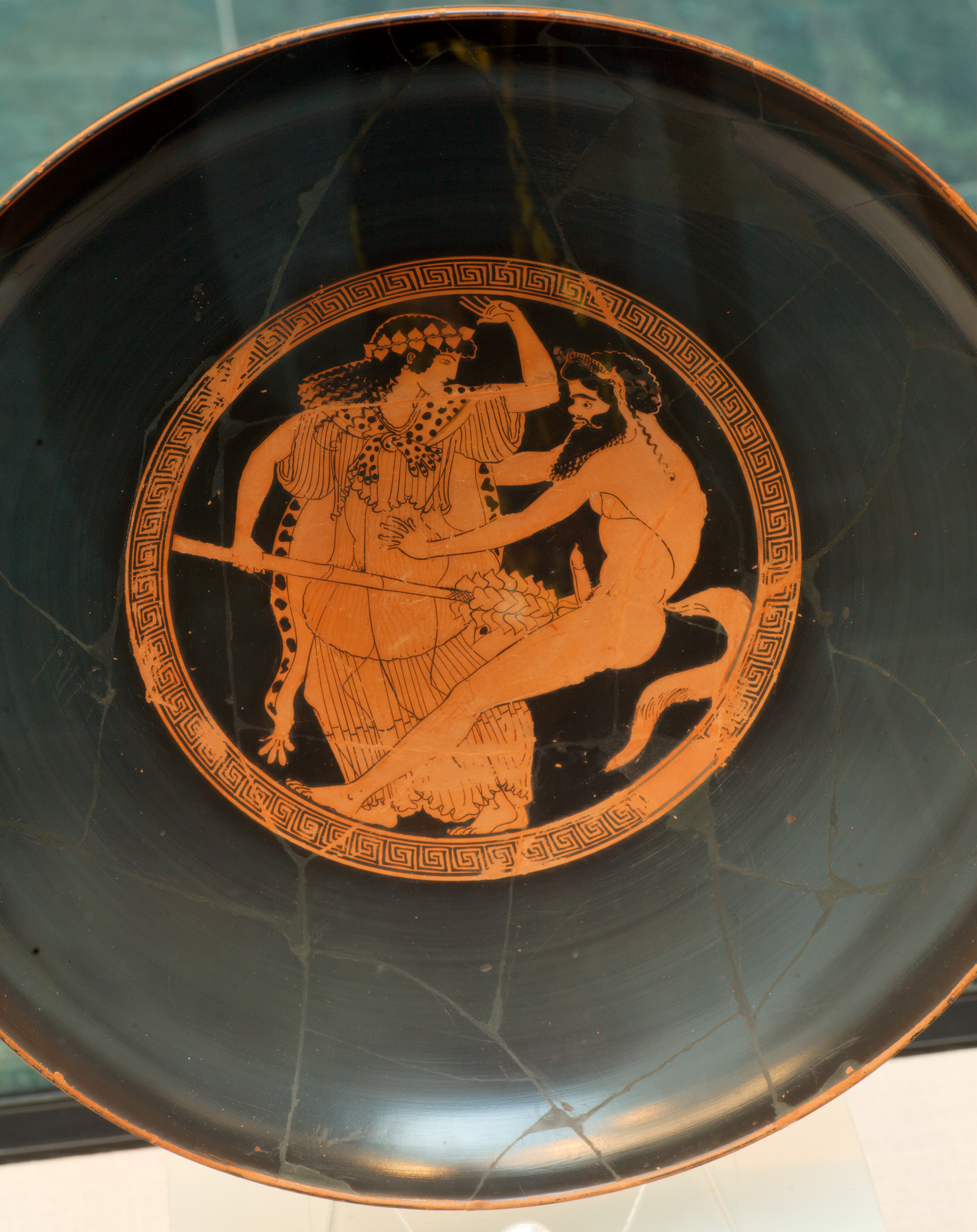
A drinking cup, c. 490–480 B.C., depicting a maenad and a satyr.

The satyr play is a form of Attic theatre performance related to both comedy and tragedy. It preserves theatrical elements of dialogue, actors speaking verse, a chorus that dances and sings, masks and costumes. Its relationship to tragedy is strong; satyr plays were written by tragedians, and were performed in the Dionysian festival following the performance of a group of three tragedies. The satyr play's mythological-heroic stories and the style of language are similar to that of the tragedies. Its connection with comedy is also significant – it has similar plots, titles, themes, characters, and happy endings. The remarkable feature of the satyr play is the chorus of satyrs, with their costumes that focus on the phallus, and with their language, which uses wordplay, sexual innuendo, and references to breasts, farting, erections, and other terms that do not occur in tragedy. As Mark Griffith points out, the satyr play was "not merely a deeply traditional Dionysiac ritual, but also generally accepted as the most appropriate and satisfying conclusion to the city’s most complex and prestigious cultural event of the year."

The satyric drama may be traced back to Pratinas of Phlius, c. 500 BC. After settling in Athens, he probably adapted the dithyramb, customary in his native home, with its chorus of satyrs, to complement the form of tragedy which had been recently invented in Athens. It met with approval and was further developed by his son Aristias, by Choerilus, by Aeschylus, and others.

== Origins ==
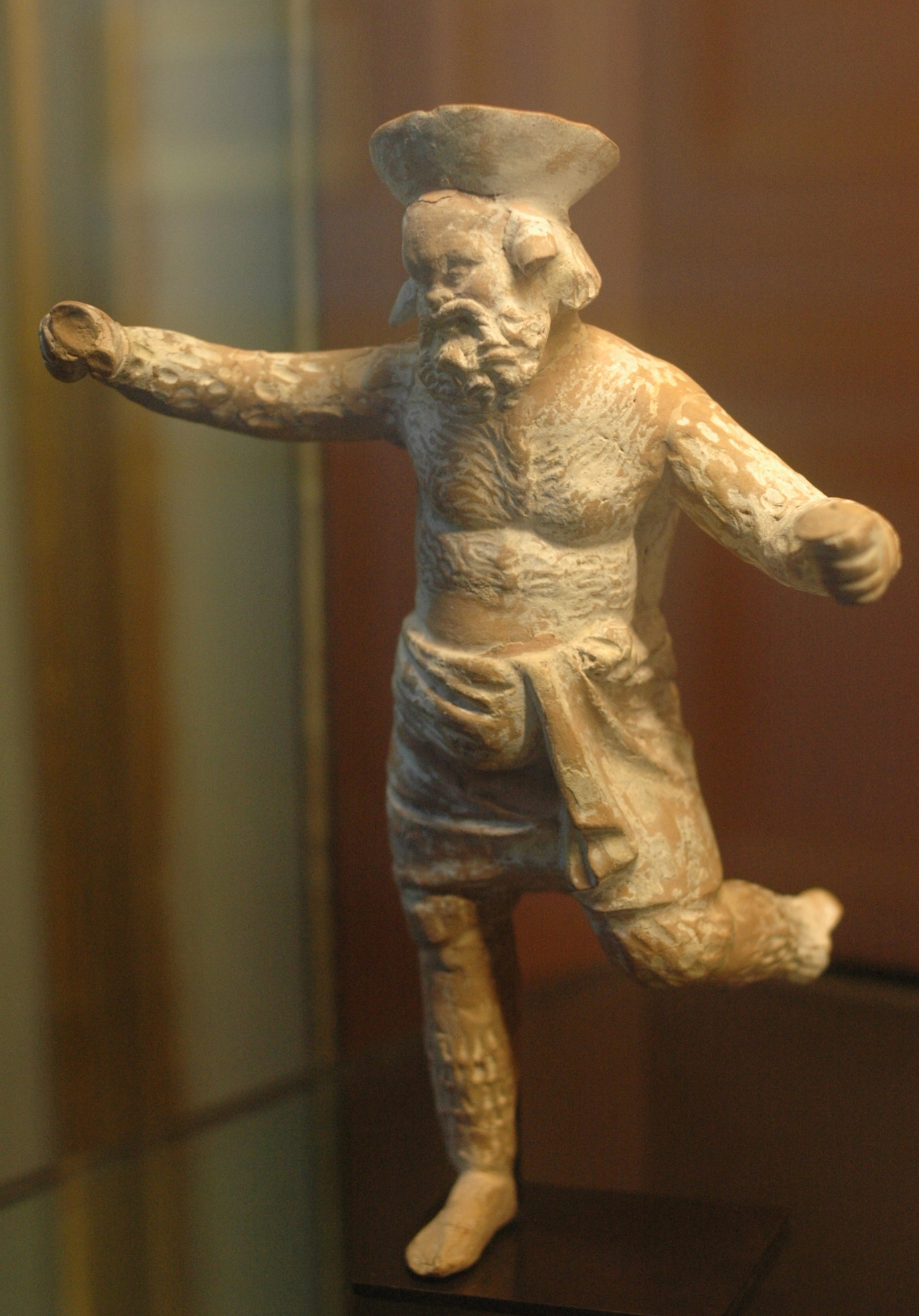
Papposilenus – a representation of Silenus as an old man, a stock character in satyr plays. He is playing crotales (cymbals).

The origins of performance culture and the emergence of the satyr play can be traced to ancient rural celebrations in honour of the god Dionysus. Rush Rehm argues that these inaugurated the "agricultural cycle of planting and harvesting" closely associated with Dionysus, who represented the embodiment of "a fundamental paradox inherent to the world, life-giving but potentially destructive." The role of the satyr play within the Festival of Dionysus is often noted to be not as important as the tragedies presented at the festival; however, it is crucial not to downplay its importance in the history of the dramatic arts. The dramatic festivities at the City Dionysia in Athens, similarly dedicated to Dionysus, required each competing tragedian to submit three tragedies and a satyr play, which functioned as the last piece performed at the festival. The accurate emergence of the satyr play is debatable; however, Brockett argues that most evidence “credits Pratinas with having invented this form sometime before 501 BC”, which is supported by P. E. Easterling’s argument that by the 5th century the satyr play was considered an integral component of the tragike didaskalia. Brockett also suggests the possibility that the satyr play was the first form of drama from which both tragedy and comedy gradually emerged.

A. E. Haigh however maintained that the satyr play is a survival from “the primitive period of Bacchic worship”. Haigh lists several examples of recorded entries to the City Dionysia: thus, in 472 BC Aeschylus won the first prize with Phineaus, Persae, Glaucus and the satyr play Prometheus. Among Euripides’ entries, Haigh underlines Theristae (431 BC), Sisyphus (415 BC) and Alcestis which Euripides was allowed to present as a replacement of the traditional satyr play. Much of the evidence and information found regarding satyr plays and their history has been located through vase paintings.

The mythological origins of the satyrs are closely linked to the advent of Dionysus into Hellenic culture. The satyrs and their female counterpart, the maenads, were followers of Dionysus, a “late-comer to Olympus and probably of Asiatic origin”. According to Roger Lancelyn Green, the satyrs probably began as minor nature deities, while their designated leader Silenus originated as a water spirit, a maker of springs and fountains. Silenus was already an attendant to Dionysus when the satyrs joined the god’s following, and was subsequently proclaimed their father. The satyrs characterised themselves by amorality, excessive drinking and the breaking down of traditional values and barriers. Eric Csapo and Margaret C. Miller further argue that satyrs have a strong connection with music and dance and consider them to be “archetypal musicians and dancers”, thus linking them to Dionysiac processions and the origins of performance culture.

The Great Dionysia went through a phase of change around the middle of the fourth century. This change brought with it a switch in the ways plays were performed. Plays were no longer performed in a completion/competition type setting. Satyrs were now performed outside of the Festival of Dionysus and were no longer subjected to the judgement among other plays. Satyrs and comedies became more relevant within the theatre community in the 430s. The newfound prevalence came after Morychides began to forbid fighting-related activities on the stage. Satyr plays did have some influence on other forms of performance as well; of the most noteworthy is Middle Comedy. This time period for comedy brought with it the humbling of gods and heroes; which was done through the domesticizing of these characters within the different performances. Middle Comedy took on many of the factors of satyr plays but adapted the performances to be what was desired by the public at that time. These plays have been said to be performed well into the Hellenistic and Roman eras.

== Extant examples ==
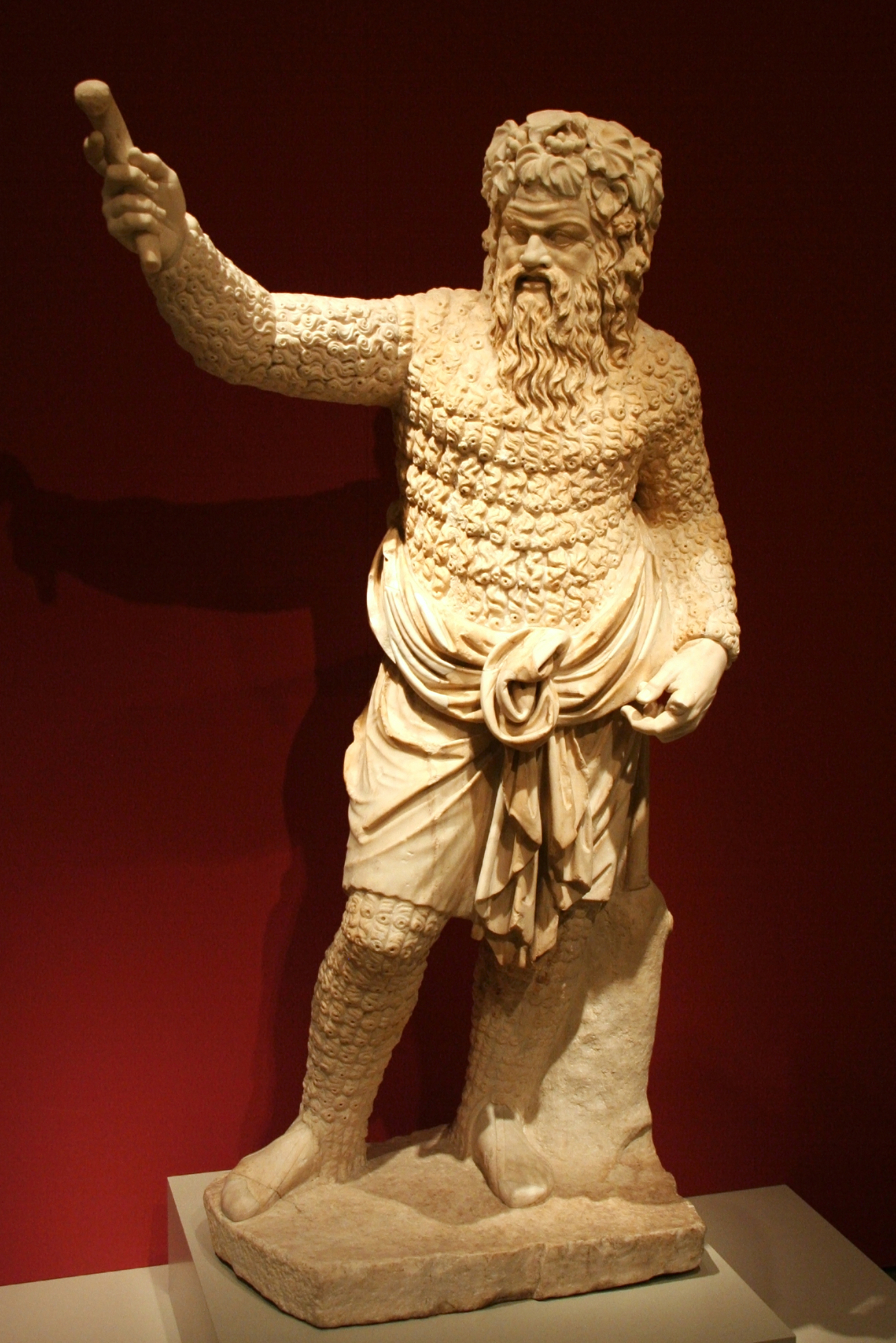
Actor as Papposilenus, around 100 AD, after 4th-century BC original

The only satyr play to survive in its entirety is Euripides' Cyclops, based on Odysseus' encounter with the cyclops Polyphemus, in Book 9 of the Odyssey. Aeschylus was noted for his satyr plays, the largest fragment of which to have survived being his Dictyulci ('The Net Fishers') in which the baby Perseus is washed up on the shore with his mother Danae and is found by Silenus and the satyrs. There are large fragments of a satyr play of Sophocles called Ichneutae ('The Trackers') in which the satyrs are employed by Apollo to track down his stolen cattle and discover the baby Hermes. Smaller fragments of other satyr plays exist, and the genre continued to be written and performed as late as the 2nd century AD, though most have wholly vanished. Even a fragment of music survives from a satyr play.

== Costumes ==
The chorus members wore masks in accordance with Bacchic tradition. The earliest reliable testimony is supplied by the Pandora Vase dating from the middle of the 5th century BC. On that vase, the satyrs are portrayed as half men and half goats, wearing goat’s horns on their heads, thus referring to the goat deities of the Doric type.

A later representation can be seen on the Pronomos Vase, found in Naples. The goatish element has disappeared and the satyrs resemble the old Ionic Sileni who were horse deities. The performers are wearing horse tails and short pants with attached phallus, a symbol of Dionysiac worship. Haigh claims that the Doric satyrs were the original performers in Attic tragedy and satiric drama, whereas the Ionic element was introduced at a later stage.

== See also ==
- The Trackers of Oxyrhynchus, a play
- Clark: A gonzomentary, a mockumentary film using satyr play techniques
