= Cleomenes =

Cleomenes may refer to:

- one of several kings of Sparta:
  - Cleomenes I (c. 520 – c. 490 BC)
  - Cleomenes II (370–309 BC)
  - Cleomenes III (236–219 BC)
- Cleomenes of Naucratis (died 322 BC), Greek administrator
- Cleomenes of Rhegium (5th-century BC), Greek poet from Magna Graecia
- Cleomenes the Cynic (c. 300 BC), Cynic philosopher
- Cleomenes (seer) (fl. 328 BC), seer in the service of Alexander the Great
- Cleomenes, the Spartan Hero (1692), a play written by John Dryden on the life of Cleomenes III
- Cleomenes (beetle), a genus of longhorn beetles
