= Cleomenini =

Scientific classification
- Kingdom: Animalia
- Phylum: Arthropoda
- Clade: Pancrustacea
- Class: Insecta
- Order: Coleoptera
- Suborder: Polyphaga
- Infraorder: Cucujiformia
- Family: Cerambycidae
- Subfamily: Cerambycinae
- Tribe: Cleomenini; Lacordaire, 1868

Tribe of beetles

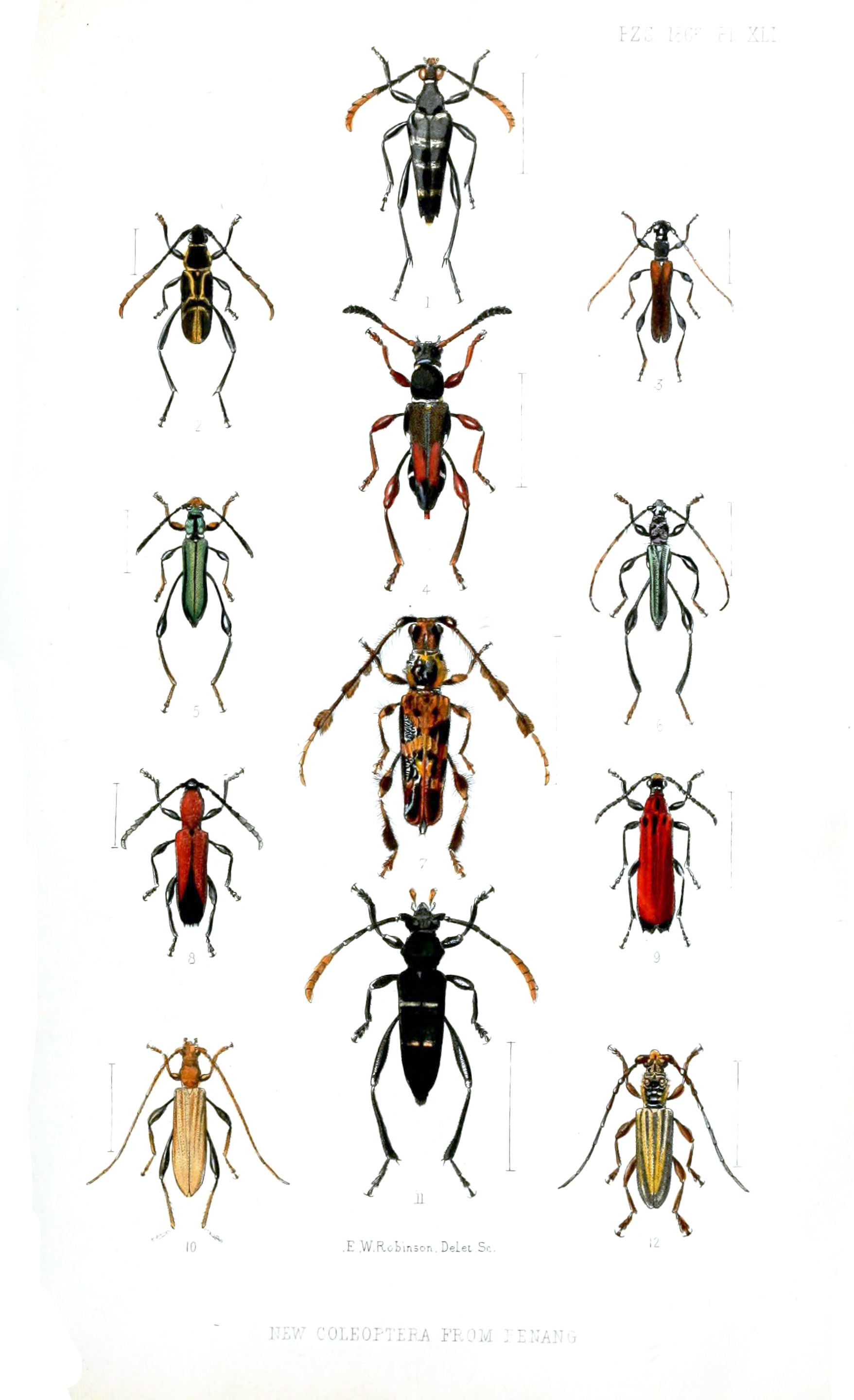
1: Asilaris zonatus 2: Prothema humeralis 3: Sestyra cephalotes 4: Mydasta discoidea 5: Epianthe viridis 6: Mimistena femorata 7: Diosyris miranda 8: Bicon sanguineus 9: Ephies cruentus 10: Comusia decolorata 11: Asmedia mimetes mimetes 12:Imbrius lineatus

Cleomenini is a tribe of beetles in the subfamily Cerambycinae, containing the following genera:

- Apiogaster Perroud, 1855
- Artimpaza Thomson, 1864
- Brachysarthron Thomson, 1864
- Camelocerambyx Pic, 1922
- Cleomenes Thomson, 1864
- Dere White, 1855
- Diplothorax Gressitt & Rondon, 1970
- Dymorphocosmisoma Pic, 1918
- Eodalis Pascoe, 1869
- Epianthe Pascoe, 1866
- Eucilmus Fairmaire, 1901
- Fehmii Özdikmen, 2006
- Hexarrhopala Gahan, 1890
- Kurarua Gressitt, 1936
- Leptoderiana Bjørnstad, 2013
- Mydasta Pascoe, 1866
- Nida Pascoe, 1867
- Nidella Gressitt & Rondon, 1970
- Ochimus Thomson, 1861
- Paramimistena Fisher, 1940
- Plutonesthes Thomson, 1864
- Procleomenes Gressitt & Rondon, 1970
- Pseudocleomenes Hayashi, 1979
- Sophron Newman, 1842
- Timabiara Napp & Mermudes, 2001
- Zosterius Thomson, 1864
