= Cleomenes of Rhegium =

Ancient Greek poet

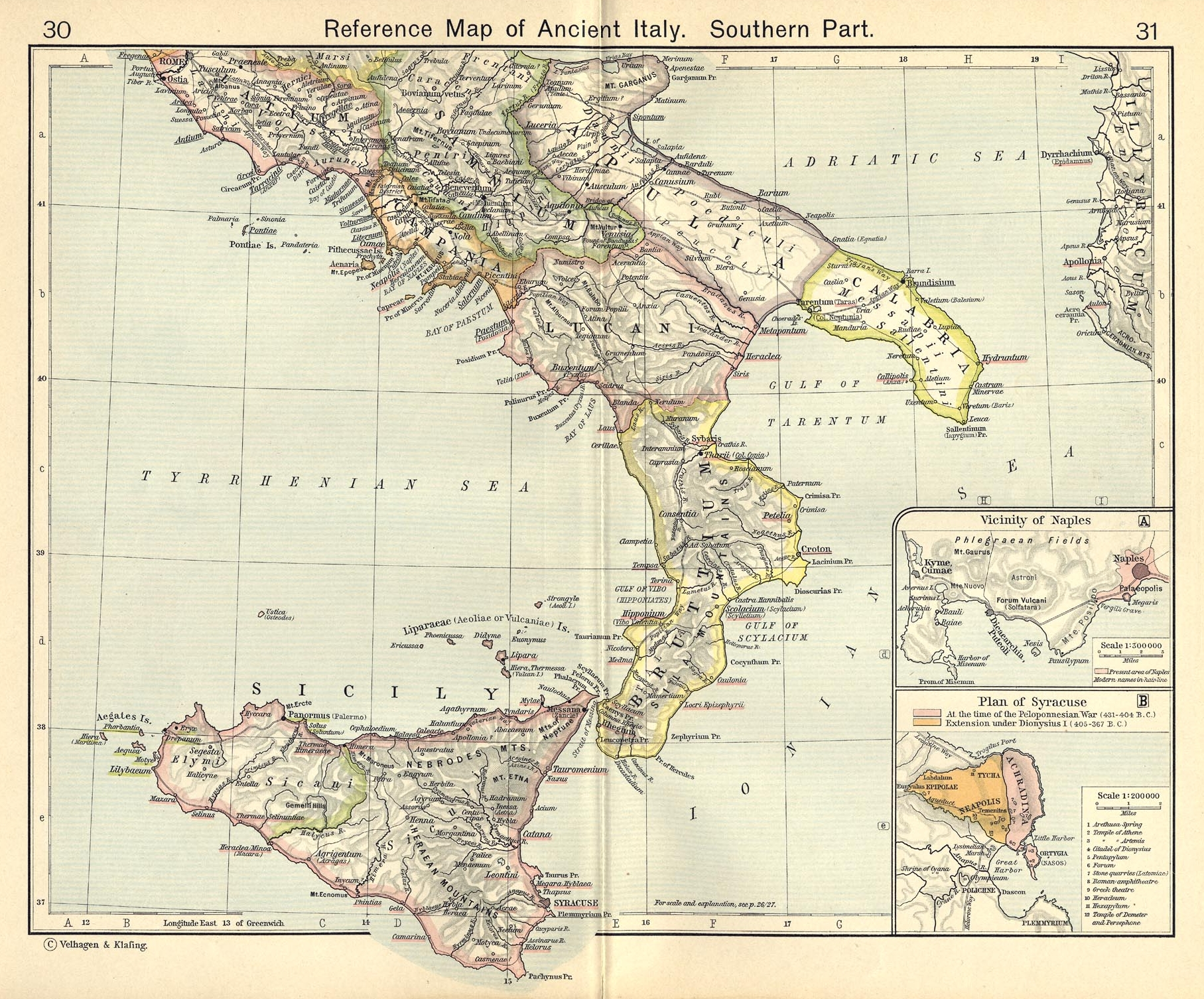
Map of Ancient Italy. Southern Part (Rhegium is in the toe of the boot)

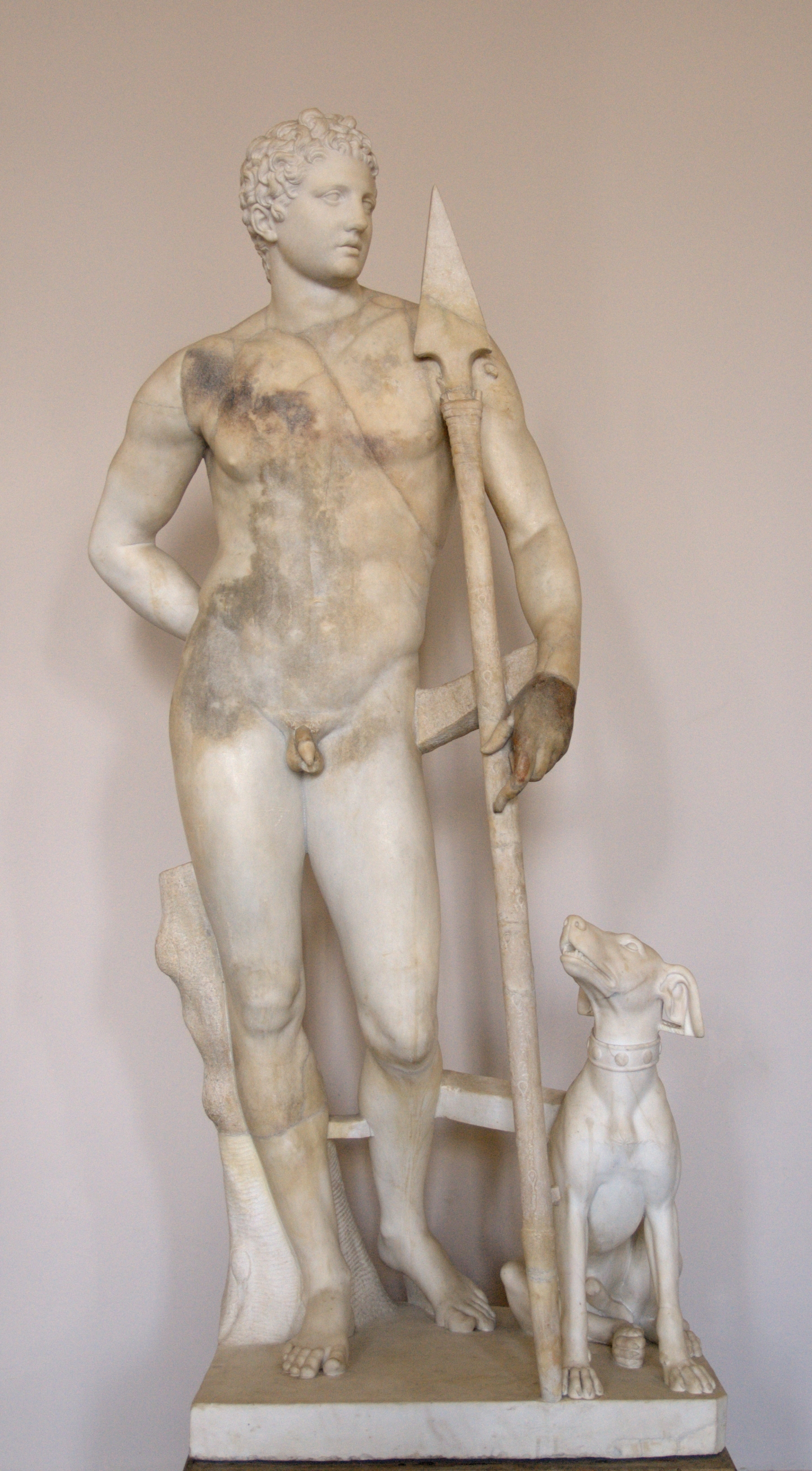
Statue of Meleager, Roman copy after a Greek bronze original, c. 340–330 BC

Cleomenes of Rhegium (Greek: Kλεoμένης Kleoménes; 5th-century BC) was a Greek dithyrambic poet, apparently from Rhegium in Magna Graecia.

== Reputation ==
According to Athenaeus, Cleomenes is censured by Chionides:

I swear that neither now Gnesippus, nor
Cleomenes with all his nine-stringed lyre,
Could ever have made this song endurable.

He is also censured by Aristophanes, according to the Scholiast on The Clouds:

Astrological knaves, and fools who their staves of dithyrambs proudly rehearse—
'Tis the Clouds who all these support at their ease, because they exalt them in verse.

Cleomenes seems to have been an erotic writer, since Epicrates mentions him (in his Anti-Lais, quoted by Athenaeus) in connexion with other such writers:

Have learnt completely all the love-songs
Of Sappho, Meletus, Cleomenes, and Lamynthius.

The allusions of other comedians to him fix his date in the latter part of the 5th-century BC.

Athenaeus mentions one of his poems by name:

But since you have also dismissed the question you raised about the colour of the Calydonian boar, whether, that is, anyone records it as having been white in colour, we will tell you who the author is; do you investigate this testimony. For it is a long time since I have happened to read the dithyrambs of Cleomenes of Rhegium; in the one which is entitled Meleager this fact is recorded.

== Sources ==
- Smith, Philip (1867). "Cleomenes, literary. 2.". In Smith, William (ed.). Dictionary of Greek and Roman Biography and Mythology. Vol. 1: Abaeus–Dysponteus. Boston: Little, Brown, and Company. p. 796.
