= Procleomenes =

Scientific classification
- Kingdom: Animalia
- Phylum: Arthropoda
- Class: Insecta
- Order: Coleoptera
- Suborder: Polyphaga
- Infraorder: Cucujiformia
- Family: Cerambycidae
- Subfamily: Cerambycinae
- Tribe: Cleomenini
- Genus: Procleomenes; Gressitt & Rondon, 1970

Genus of beetles

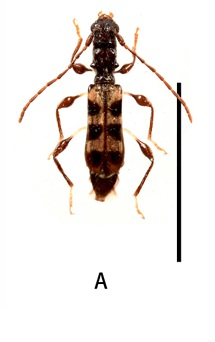
Procleomenes humeralis

Procleomenes is a genus of longhorn beetles in the family Cerambycidae.

== Species ==
- Procleomenes aenescens Holzschuh, 1991
- Procleomenes bialbofasciatus Hayashi, 1979
- Procleomenes bifasciatus Vives, 2015
- Procleomenes borneensis Niisato, 1986
- Procleomenes brevis Holzschuh, 2008
- Procleomenes cabigasi Niisato & Vives, 2005
- Procleomenes comatus Holzschuh, 2008
- Procleomenes ebiharai Niisato & Vives, 2005
- Procleomenes elongatithorax Gressitt & Rondon, 1970
- Procleomenes glabrescens Niisato, 1981
- Procleomenes humeralis Niisato, 2008
- Procleomenes jianfenglingensis Hua, 1986
- Procleomenes longicollis Niisato, 1986
- Procleomenes malayanus Niisato, 1985
- Procleomenes medinai Barševskis, 2022
- Procleomenes mioleucus Holzschuh, 1998
- Procleomenes morio Holzschuh, 2007
- Procleomenes nanulus Holzschuh, 2007
- Procleomenes negrosus Niisato & Tichý, 2016
- Procleomenes palawanensis Barševskis & Torrejos, 2024
- Procleomenes philippinensis Niisato & Vives, 2005
- Procleomenes robustius Niisato, 1981
- Procleomenes samarensis Barševskis, 2019
- Procleomenes shimomurai Niisato, 1981
- Procleomenes taoi Niisato, 1985
- Procleomenes tenuiformis Niisato, 1986
