= Magnes (comic poet) =

Athenian poet of Old Comedy

Magnes (Greek: Μάγνης) was an Athenian comic poet of the 5th century BC, a native of the deme of Icaria in Attica. Magnes and his contemporary Chionides are the earliest comic poets for whom victories are recorded in the literary competition of the Dionysia festival.

His death was alluded to by Aristophanes, who stated that in his old age Magnes had lost the popularity which he had formerly enjoyed.

Titles of his comedies:

- Βαρβίτιδες (Barbitides), Guitarists of Barbiton
- Βάτραχοι (Batrachoi), Frogs
- Γαλεομυομαχία (Galeomyomachia), Battle of Cats and Mice
- Διόνυσος (Dionysos), Dionysus
- Λυδοί (Lydoi), Lydians
- Ὄρνιθες (Ornithes), Birds
- Πιτακίς ή Πυτακίδης (Pitakis or Pytakidis, related to Pita, Pytia or Pittakion, Wax tablet)
- Ποάστρια (Poastria), Female Farm-Worker (derived from Poa)
- Ψῆνες (Psenes), Fig wasps
