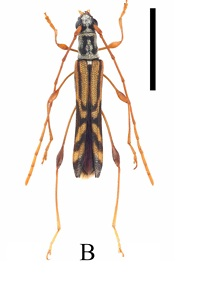
- Cleomenes tenuipes tenuipes

Scientific classification
- Domain: Eukaryota
- Kingdom: Animalia
- Phylum: Arthropoda
- Class: Insecta
- Order: Coleoptera
- Suborder: Polyphaga
- Infraorder: Cucujiformia
- Family: Cerambycidae
- Genus: Cleomenes (beetle)
- Species: C. tenuipes

Binomial name
- Cleomenes tenuipes Gressitt, 1939

= Cleomenes tenuipes =

Species of beetle

Cleomenes tenuipes is a species of beetle of the Cerambycidae family. This species is found in China (Sichuan, Shaanxi, Hubei, Zhejiang, Guangxi, Yunnan), Taiwan, Vietnam, Laos, India, Malaysia.

== Subspecies ==
- Cleomenes tenuipes tenuipes (China [Sichuan, Shaanxi, Hubei, Zhejiang, Guangxi, Yunnan], Taiwan, Vietnam, Laos, India, Malaysia)
- Cleomenes tenuipes constans Holzschuh, 2019 (China: Guangxi)
