= List of ancient Greek writers =

This is a list of most influential Greek authors of antiquity (by alphabetic order):

- Aeschines – Rhetorics
- Aeschylus – Tragedy
- Aesop – Fables
- Alcaeus of Mytilene – Lyric Poetry
- Alcman – Lyric Poetry
- Anacreon – Lyric Poetry
- Anaxagoras – Philosophy
- Anaximander – Philosophy, Mathematics
- Anaximenes – Philosophy, Mathematics
- Andocides – Rhetorics
- Antiphon – Rhetorics
- Apollodorus of Carystus – Comedy
- Apollonius of Rhodes – Epic poetry
- Aristophanes – Comedy
- Archimedes – Mathematics, Geometry
- Aristotle – Philosophy, Physics, Biology
- Aratus – Poetry, Astronomy
- Arrian – History
- Athanasius of Alexandria – Theology
- Bacchylides – Lyric Poetry
- Callimachus - Small-scale, personal poetry
- Chionides – Comedy
- Chrysippus – Philosophy
- Claudius Ptolemy – Geography, Astronomy
- Clement of Alexandria – Theology, Philosophy
- Democritus – Philosophy, Chemistry
- Demosthenes – Rhetorics, Politics
- Dinarchus – Rhetorics
- Dinon – History
- Diodorus – History
- Diogenes Laërtius – History of Philosophy
- Duris of Samos – History
- Epicurus – Philosophy
- Epimenides of Knossos – Philosophy, Philosophical poetry
- Eubulus (poet) – Comedy
- Euclid of Megara – Mathematics, Geometry
- Euripides – Tragedy
- Evagrius Ponticus – Theology
- Gorgias – Philosophy
- Hegemon of Thasos – Comedy
- Heraclitus – Philosophy
- Herodotus of Halicarnassus – History
- Hesiod – Epic Poetry
- Hippocrates of Cos – Medicine
- Homer – Epic Poetry
- Hypereides – Rhetorics
- Iamblichus – Philosophy
- Ibycus of Rhegium – Lyric Poetry
- Irenaeus – Theology, Philosophy
- Isaeus – Rhetorics, Logography
- Isocrates – Rhetorics
- Justin the Martyr – Theology, Philosophy
- Leucippus – Philosophy, Atomism
- Lucian – Satire, Rhetoric
- Luke the Evangelist – Theology, Medicine, History
- Lycurgus of Athens – Rhetorics
- Lysias – Logography, Rhetorics
- Maximus the Confessor – Theology, Philosophy
- Menander – Comedy
- Melissus of Samos – Philosophy
- Nicomachus of Gerasa – Mathematics
- Origen – Theology, Philosophy
- Papias of Hierapolis – Theology
- Parmenides – Philosophy
- Pausanias (geographer) – Geography
- Pherecydes of Athens – Mythography, Logography
- Philo of Alexandria – Theology, Philosophy
- Pindar – Lyrical Poetry
- Plato – Philosophy
- Plutarch – History, Biography, Philosophy
- Polybius – History
- Posidippus (comic poet) – Comedy
- Protagoras – Philosophy
- Sappho of Lesbos – Lyric Poetry
- Simonides – Lyric Poetry
- Solon – Politics, Philosophy
- Sophocles – Tragedy
- Stesichorus – Lyric Poetry
- Strattis – Comedy
- Thales of Miletus – Philosophy, Mathematics, Astronomy, Physics
- Theocritus – Bucolic poetry
- Theognis of Megara – Lyric Poetry
- Theopompus – History
- Thucydides – History
- Xenarchus of Seleucia – Philosophy, Philology
- Xenophanes– Philosophy, Theology
- Xenophon – History
- Zeno of Citium – Philosophy
- Zeno of Elea – Philosophy
