= Pseudocleomenes =

Scientific classification
- Kingdom: Animalia
- Phylum: Arthropoda
- Class: Insecta
- Order: Coleoptera
- Suborder: Polyphaga
- Infraorder: Cucujiformia
- Family: Cerambycidae
- Subfamily: Cerambycinae
- Tribe: Cleomenini
- Genus: Pseudocleomenes; Hayashi, 1979

Genus of beetles

Pseudocleomenes is a genus of longhorn beetles in the family Cerambycidae.

== Species ==
- Pseudocleomenes albobifasciatus Hayashi, 1979
- Pseudocleomenes tritus Holzschuh, 2016
