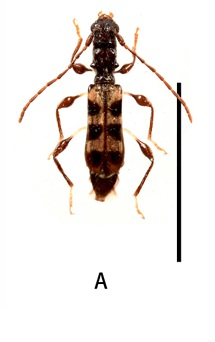

Scientific classification
- Domain: Eukaryota
- Kingdom: Animalia
- Phylum: Arthropoda
- Class: Insecta
- Order: Coleoptera
- Suborder: Polyphaga
- Infraorder: Cucujiformia
- Family: Cerambycidae
- Genus: Procleomenes
- Species: P. humeralis

Binomial name
- Procleomenes humeralis Niisato, 2008

= Procleomenes humeralis =

Species of beetle

Procleomenes humeralis is a species of beetle in the family Cerambycidae. This species is found in central and north-eastern Laos and China (Yunnan).
