= Gnesippus =

Ancient Greek Doric lyric poet

Gnesippus (Greek: Γνήσιππος), son of Cleomachus, a Doric lyric poet, according to Meineke, whose light and licentious love verses were attacked by the Athenian comic poets Chionides, Cratinus, and Eupolis. The passages quoted by Athenaeus (παιγνιαγράφου τῆς ἱλαρᾶς μούσης, playful composer) seem to support, however, the opinion of Welcker, that Gnesippus was also a tragic poet, and that the description of his poetry given by Athenaeus refers to his choral odes, which traditionally were written in a standardized Doric form.
