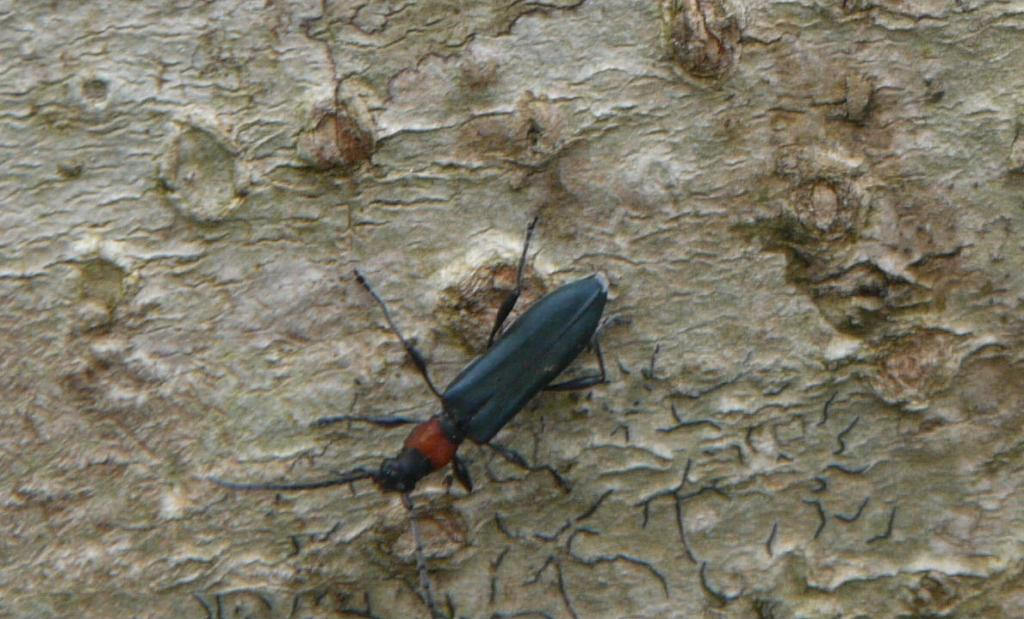
- Dere thoracica

Scientific classification
- Domain: Eukaryota
- Kingdom: Animalia
- Phylum: Arthropoda
- Class: Insecta
- Order: Coleoptera
- Suborder: Polyphaga
- Infraorder: Cucujiformia
- Family: Cerambycidae
- Genus: Dere

= Dere (beetle) =

Genus of insects

Dere is a genus of beetles belonging to the family Cerambycidae.

The species of this genus are found in Japan and Southern Africa.

Species:

- Dere acaciae Gardner, 1939
- Dere adelpha Holzschuh, 1995
- Dere affinis Gahan, 1906
