= Cleomenes (beetle) =

Scientific classification
- Domain: Eukaryota
- Kingdom: Animalia
- Phylum: Arthropoda
- Class: Insecta
- Order: Coleoptera
- Suborder: Polyphaga
- Infraorder: Cucujiformia
- Family: Cerambycidae
- Subfamily: Cerambycinae
- Tribe: Cleomenini
- Genus: Cleomenes (beetle); Thomson, 1864

Genus of beetles

Cleomenes is a genus of longhorn beetles in the family Cerambycidae.

== Species ==
- Cleomenes apicalis Holzschuh, 1977
- Cleomenes assamensis Gardner, 1926
- Cleomenes atricornis Holzschuh, 1995
- Cleomenes auricollis Kano, 1933
- Cleomenes banauensis Vives, 2009
- Cleomenes cabrasae Barševska & Barševskis, 2020
- Cleomenes chryseus Gahan, 1906
- Cleomenes cognatus Holzschuh, 1991
- Cleomenes copei Vives, 2009
- Cleomenes dihammaphoroides Thomson, 1864
- Cleomenes diversevittatus Fuchs, 1961
- Cleomenes giganteus Holzschuh, 1995
- Cleomenes hainanensis Viktora, 2019
- Cleomenes hefferni Hüdepohl, 1998
- Cleomenes hilaris Holzschuh, 2009
- Cleomenes infuscatus Vives, 2015
- Cleomenes katrinae Barševska & Barševskis, 2020
- Cleomenes laetabilis Holzschuh, 2003
- Cleomenes lautus Holzschuh, 1991
- Cleomenes longipennis Gressitt, 1951
- Cleomenes lyra Holzschuh, 1989
- Cleomenes malayanus Hayashi, 1979
- Cleomenes medinai Barševska & Barševskis, 2020
- Cleomenes micarius Holzschuh, 1991
- Cleomenes modicatus Holzschuh, 1995
- Cleomenes multiplagatus Pu, 1992
- Cleomenes nigricollis Fairmaire, 1895
- Cleomenes ornatus Holzschuh, 1981
- Cleomenes robustior Holzschuh, 1995
- Cleomenes rufobasalis Holzschuh, 1991
- Cleomenes rufofemoratus Pic, 1914
- Cleomenes rufonigra Vives, 2009
- Cleomenes semiargentens Gressitt, 1945
- Cleomenes semilineatus Pic, 1957
- Cleomenes seramensis Viktora, 2021
- Cleomenes takiguchii Ohbayashi, 1936
- Cleomenes tenuipes Gressitt, 1939
- Cleomenes trinotatithorax Mitono, 1944
- Cleomenes vittatoides Holzschuh, 2006
- Cleomenes vittatus Pascoe, 1869
