= Timabiara =

Timabiara bahiensis

Scientific classification
- Kingdom: Animalia
- Phylum: Arthropoda
- Clade: Pancrustacea
- Class: Insecta
- Order: Coleoptera
- Suborder: Polyphaga
- Infraorder: Cucujiformia
- Family: Cerambycidae
- Genus: Timabiara
- Species: T. bahiensis

Binomial name
- Timabiara bahiensis Napp & Mermudes, 2001

Genus of beetles

Timabiara bahiensis is a species of beetle in the family Cerambycidae, the only species in the genus Timabiara.
