= Cleomenes (seer) =

Ancient seer for Alexander the Great

Cleomenes was a seer in Alexander's entourage, who in 328 BC interpreted an unfavorable omen for the king at the time of the Cleitus affair. Cleomenes was one of several men who slept in the alleged temple of Serapis at the time of Alexander's fatal illness.
