= Chionides =

Athenian comic poet

Chionides (Greek: Χιονίδης or Χιωνίδης) an Athenian comic poet of the 5th century BC, contemporary of Magnes. The Suda says that Chionides flourished eight years before the Greco-Persian Wars, that is, 487 BC. But Augustus Meineke thinks that Chionides flourished no earlier than 460 BC. In confirmation of this date he quotes from Athenaeus, who quoted a fragment of Chionides' Πτωχοί (Beggars), which mentions Gnesippus, a poet contemporary with Cratinus. Aristotle also notes that Chionides "lived long after Epicharmus". But Athenaeus also noted that some critics at the time regarded Chionides' Πτωχοί as spurious. Similarly, some scholars (e.g. Heinrich Ritter) strongly argue against the genuineness of Aristotle's observations.

Titles of his comedies:

- Ἥρωες (Heroes), The Heroes
- Πτωχοί (Ptochoi), Poor People, or Beggars
- Πέρσαι (Persai), The Persians, or Ἁσσυριοι (Assyrioi), The Assyrians

== Fragments ==
- Theodor Kock. Comicorum Atticorum fragmenta, i. (1880).
- Augustus Meineke. Potarum Graecorum comicorum fragmenta, (1855).
- Rudolf Kassel, Colin Austin. Poetae comici Graeci Volume 4. (1983)
