= Dyskolos =

Comic play by Menander (c. 317–316 BCE)

- Written by: Menander
- Chorus: Worshippers of Pan
- Characters: Pan, a god; Sostratos, a young man; Kallippides, his father; Sostratos' mother; Chaireas, his companion; Pyrrhias, his slave; Getas, another slave; Knemon, an old villager; Myrrhine, Knemon's daughter; Simiche, an old servant; Gorgias, his stepson; Daos, a slave; Sikon, a cook
- Mute: Gorgias' mother; Donax, a slave; Other slaves, female relatives, friends of Sostratos' mother
- Original language: Ancient Greek
- Genre: New Comedy
- Setting: A country road in Phyle outside Athens in front of a temple of Pan.

Premiere
- Date premiered: 316 BCE
- Place premiered: Lenaia Festival, Athens

Dyskolos (Greek: Δύσκολος, pronounced [dýskolos], translated as The Grouch, The Misanthrope, The Curmudgeon, The Bad-tempered Man or Old Cantankerous) is an Ancient Greek comedy by Menander, the only one of his plays, and of the whole New Comedy, that has survived in nearly complete form. It was first presented at the Lenaian festival in Athens in 316 BCE, where it won Menander the first prize.

It was long known only through fragmentary quotations; but a papyrus manuscript of the nearly complete Dyskolos, dating to the 3rd century, was recovered in Egypt in 1952 and forms part of the Bodmer Papyri and Oxyrhynchus Papyri. The play was published in 1958 by Victor Martin.

The story of the play concerns a rich young nobleman, Sostratos, who falls in love at first sight with a village peasant girl and decides to marry her. Unfortunately, her father, Knemon, is reclusive, notoriously bad-tempered, and next to impossible to approach. Eventually, after winning over Knemon's stepson Gorgias, showing his own work ethic, and helping to rescue Knemon from the well he has absurdly fallen into, Sostratos wins Knemon over and receives his blessing to marry his daughter. Sostratos also persuades his own father, Kallippides, to bless the betrothal of his own daughter to Gorgias. At the end of the play, Knemon is dragged kicking and screaming by the other characters to join the party for his daughter's wedding. As explained in the prologue, the events of the play are secretly orchestrated by the god Pan who wishes to reward the religious piety of Knemon's daughter and force Knemon, against his will, to experience a redemption arc.

The Dyskolos inspired Molière, who knew only the theme of the play, as it had not yet been found, in his writing of The Misanthrope (1666).

== Plot ==
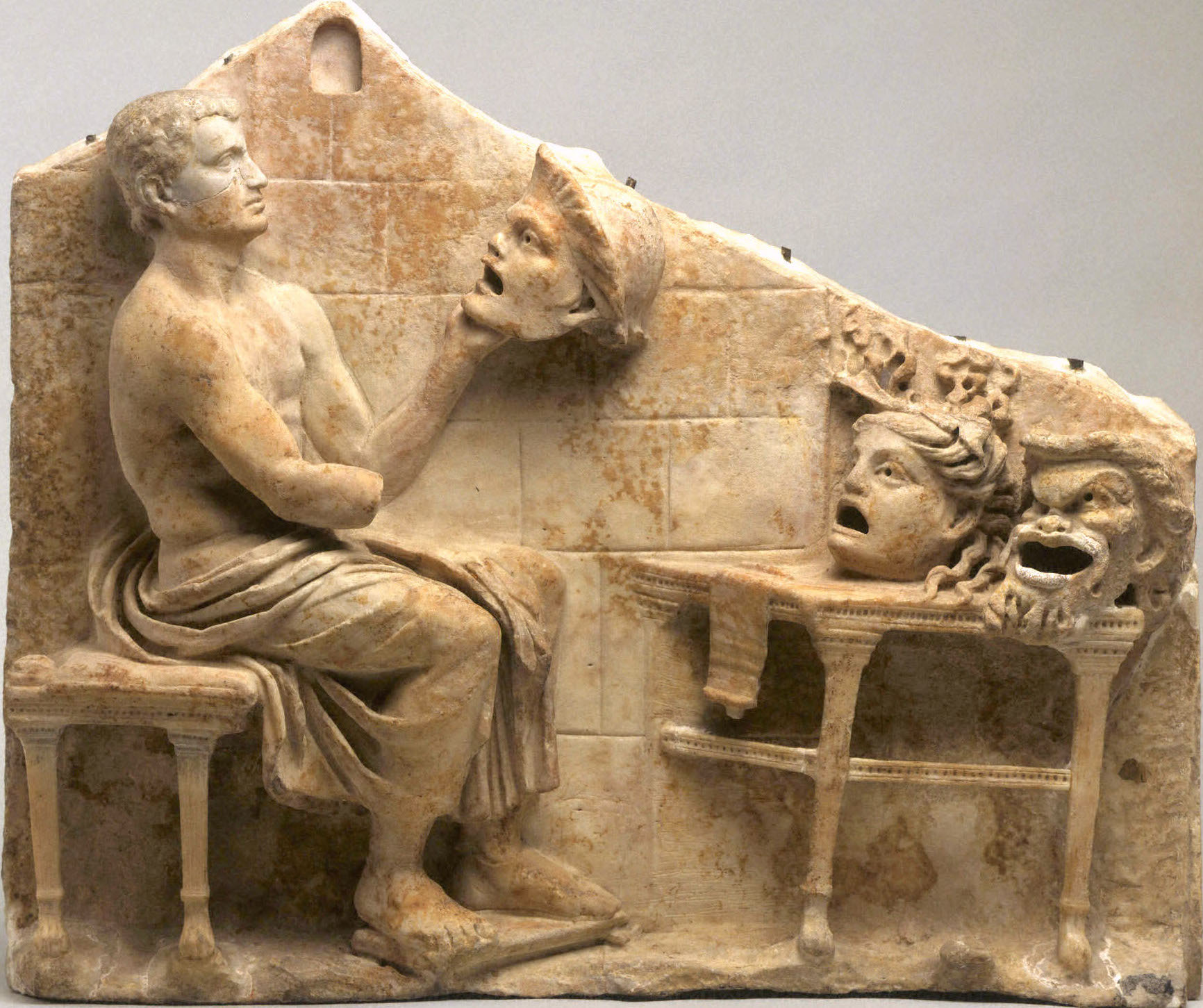
Menander with masks depicting New Comedy characters: youth, false maiden, and the old man, Princeton University Art Museum

=== Setting ===
The backdrop of the stage consists of three buildings: the house of Gorgias (a farmer who is the stepson of Knemon), a temple of Pan and the Nymphs, and the house of Knemon (the Bad-Tempered Man of the title). The action of the play takes place in the street in front of these buildings.

=== Prologue ===
The god Pan comes out from his temple, and explains the background to the play. The scene is the village of Phyle (some 13 miles north-west of Athens). He says that in the house next door lives a bad-tempered and irritable old man, living with his daughter and an old servant-woman. He tells how Knemon married a widow who already had a son by her first husband, but his continual bad temper caused her to leave him and go to live with her son. Pan says that because the girl won his favour by honouring the nymphs in his temple, he caused a certain rich city boy (Sostratos), who was hunting and spotted Knemon's daughter honouring the nymphs, to fall in love with her.

=== Act 1 ===
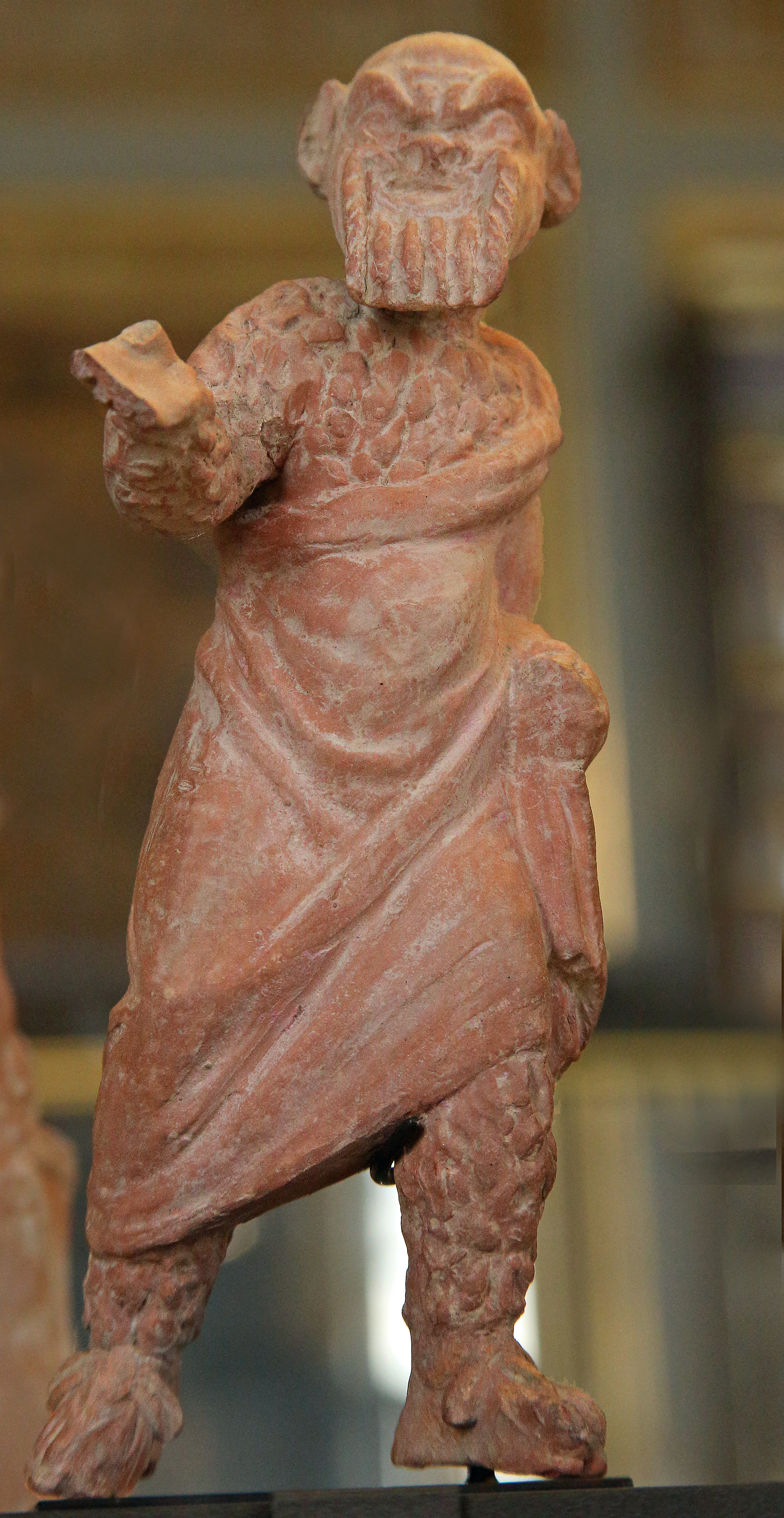
Comic figurine possibly depicting Knemon (the Grouch) c. 330 BCE

Sostratos, a young Athenian man who is hunting in the forest, enters with his poor companion Chaireas. He tells Chaireas about his love for the girl, and that he has sent his slave Pyrrhias to talk with her father. Suddenly Pyrrhias comes in running, shouting that he is being chased by a madman who is throwing stones at him. He explains how, when he knocked on the door, the old woman had sent him to the orchard where Knemon was working, and Knemon had been furious and beaten him up. Chaireas says that poor farmers are often bad-tempered. He promises to come back the next day to talk to the girl's father when he has calmed down; then he departs. Sostratos says he suspects that Pyrrhias must have done something wrong, and he sends him home, saying he is going to wait for the girl's father.

Knemon now enters from his orchard, grumbling about trespassers. Sostratos addresses him and says that he is waiting for someone. Knemon answers him bad-temperedly and goes inside. Sostratos, who is shy, decides that he must fetch his father's cunning slave Getas to deal with the matter.

Now Knemon's daughter comes out carrying a jar. She complains that the old woman has accidentally dropped the water-pot down the well, and she must get some water from the nymphs, if no one is making a sacrifice, so that her father can have a bath. Sostratos steps forward and offers to help her. He takes her jar and goes into the temple.

Daos, a slave of Gorgias, comes out of Gorgias's house. Unobserved, he sees Sostratos giving the jar to Knemon's daughter and assumes he is up to no good. He decides he must go at once and inform his master, the girl's half-brother.

Chorus

A group of drunk Pan-worshippers enter and dance to music. They remain in the area in front of the stage until the end of the play, dancing at the end of each act.

=== Act 2 ===
Gorgias returns from the fields with Daos. He scolds Daos and tells him that he should have spoken to the stranger sooner. Sostratos, who has been back home, enters saying that Getas was not available, because Sostratos's mother had sent him to hire a cook so that she could make a sacrifice; so Sostratos must try to speak to the girl's father himself. Gorgias stops Sostratos and asks if he may give him some advice: he warns him to stay away and not think he can get away with bad behaviour just because of his wealth. Sostratos protests that he is in love with the girl and has come to see her father because he wants to marry her. Gorgias tells him that he is wasting his time, since her father is very misanthropic and won't let her marry anyone except a poor farmer like himself. Daos advises him that if he takes off his smart cloak and works in the fields the girl's father might agree to talk to him. He lends Sostratos his two-pronged hoe and goes off to do some other work. Sostratos and Gorgias go off to the fields.

From the other side of the stage, the cook, Sikon, now arrives, struggling to carry a sheep. He is followed soon afterwards by the slave Getas, who is carrying a huge load of cushions and other things. Getas tells Sikon that his mistress had ordered a sacrifice to be made to Pan because she had had a bad dream that Pan had given her son a hoe and forced him to start digging the neighbour's land. Sikon tells Getas to cheer up and promises him a good meal. They go together into the temple.

=== Act 3 ===
Knemon leaves his house, intending to work in the fields. But just at that moment, Sostratos's mother and a party of followers (including a female piper) arrive carrying food-hampers, incense, and wine. The mother orders the piper to start playing. Getas comes out of the temple and tells her they are ready for the sacrifice. As they enter the temple, the mother asks Knemon what he is staring at. He curses the visitors and decides to go back inside his house.

Getas comes out of the temple, complaining that the slaves have forgotten the cooking pot. He knocks on Knemon's door hoping to borrow one. Knemon comes out in a fury, refuses to lend him anything, and slams the door. Getas returns to the temple. Sikon comes out, complaining that if you want to borrow anything you have to use flattering words. He knocks on Knemon's door. Knemon comes out even more angrily and starts hitting Sikon with a strap. Sikon stands away and says he merely came to ask to borrow a pot. Seeing that he is getting nowhere, he decides he will roast the meat instead of boiling it. He goes back to the temple.

Sostratos arrives from the field aching all over. He complains that he worked there for a long time, but Knemon never arrived. Suddenly Getas comes out of the temple, complaining that he is having to do all the work himself. Sostratos accosts him. When Getas tells him about the sacrifice, Sostratos decides it would be a good idea to invite Gorgias and Daos to the feast, to get them on his side. He departs to the fields.

The old servant-woman comes out of Knemon's house, lamenting that when trying to fish out the water jar from the well with a hoe, she had dropped the hoe into the well too. Knemon comes out in a fury and chases her into the house. He says he will go down the well himself. Getas, hearing him, offers to lend him a rope but Knemon curses him and goes inside.

Sostratos arrives with Gorgias and Daos. Gorgias seems reluctant at first to accept Sostratos's invitation to the feast, but eventually he tells Daos to go home and attend to his mother, while he himself accompanies Sostratos into the temple.

=== Act 4 ===
Knemon's servant-woman Simiche comes out shouting for help and saying that her master has fallen into the well. The cook Sikon, hearing her, refuses to help. She therefore calls for Gorgias, who comes out of the temple along with Sostratos. They go inside Knemon's house with the old woman. The cook, Sikon, remains on stage saying unsympathetically that it serves the old man right. Saying he hopes Knemon has been crippled by the fall, he returns to the temple.

Sostratos comes out from Knemon's house. He tells the audience how Gorgias went down the well, while he and the daughter waited above; then he had hauled Knemon out. The door of Knemon's house now opens revealing (by means of an eccyclema or roll-out platform) Knemon lying injured on a couch with Gorgias comforting him. Knemon asks Gorgias to call his mother, Knemon's former wife. (A small part of the manuscript is missing here.) Knemon makes a long speech (the metre changes for this speech from iambic trimeter to trochaic tetrameter catalectic) regretting his misanthropic ways and resolving to be more friendly in future. He tells Gorgias that he is adopting him as his son, and giving him the responsibility for finding a husband for his sister; she may have half his property as a dowry. Gorgias introduces Sostratos, who is standing nearby. Noticing that Sostratos is sunburnt like a farmer, and reassured by Gorgias, Knemon gives his assent to their getting married. He is wheeled back inside his house. Gorgias then betroths his sister to Sostratos.

Suddenly Sostratos's father Kallipides arrives. Sostratos tells him that the sacrifice is over, but that they have saved him some food. Kallipides goes inside the temple to eat. He is followed by Sostratos, who wants to ask for permission to marry Knemon's daughter. Gorgias goes inside too.

=== Act 5 ===
Sostratos and his father emerge from the temple. The father has given his assent to Sostratos marrying Knemon's daughter. Now Sostratos tries to persuade him to allow Gorgias to marry Sostratos's sister. Kallipides is at first reluctant, since Gorgias is poor, but eventually gives his assent. Gorgias now steps forward: he has overheard the conversation. He thanks Sostratos but says he cannot agree to marrying his sister since he is poor. But after Kallipides encourages him not to be proud, he agrees. Kallipides promises him a dowry of three talents, while Gorgias says he will give his sister one talent. Kallipides says they will hold the two weddings the next day. He tells Gorgias to fetch his mother and sister, and he himself goes into the temple. Sostratos proclaims his delight. Soon Gorgias brings out his sister and mother, and they go into the temple to meet their new in-laws. A little while later Simiche comes out too, after telling Knemon that he is wrong to stay behind when he has been invited.

(Most of the rest of the scene is in iambic tetrameters catalectic, accompanied by a piper.) Getas comes out and tells Simiche she may go inside since he is going to sit with Knemon. Then he calls out the cook Sikon and asks him he would like to come to get his own back on Knemon for his earlier rudeness. He suggests that they can tease him and infuriate him by asking to borrow things. Sicon goes into the house and brings out Knemon, who is asleep. He lays him down. Then Getas bangs on the door and shouts to imaginary slave boys that he wishes to borrow things. Next Sikon comes and does the same thing. In poetic language he describes the delightful party which Knemon is missing. Now they help Knemon to his feet and call two more slaves to carry him into the temple. Getas asks the audience to applaud.

== Character descriptions ==
Menander writes his slave characters as intelligent, independent individuals who act on their own wants and goals, as well as considering the fortunes of their masters. These characters impact the story lines of the other characters while not directly changing them. The play as a whole demonstrates and examines the social class system of the time and provides multiple perspectives through each character.

== Thematic Analysis ==
Class

William M Owens Contextualizes the play as a response to the contemporary political circumstances. In particular, Owens argues that the play is used to criticise the demos involved in the handling of Phokion, the previous general and head of government, who had established a high financial requirement for citizenship that would have disenfranchised much of Athens. Furthermore, he argues that the text endorses the contemporary regime by Demetrios, him also placing a financial requirement for citizenship, albeit at a significantly lowered cost. For example, Owen notes that Knemon and Georgias both fit within the "franchised poor" as land and slave owning men, despite the play hinging on the class divide between the farmers and Sostratos . As such, Owens frames the play's theme of class mixing as an aspect of oligarchal rule, and not a rebellion against it.

Within the text, he notes that the reoccurring usage of the theme of epimeleia, or the act of caring for others, is framed as a matter of philanthropy, using the treatment of Pan and Sostratos towards Knemon's daughter in order to highlight the text's favourable view of the oligarchy, in spite of the comical treatment of Sostratos' character. Owen also interprets Knemon as the archetypical peasant demos, with all their best and worst aspects exaggerated for comic effect, in order to reflect upon the treatment of Phokion by the lower class, especially when leading up to his execution. Finally, Owens also compares the battle of Marathon and the treatment of the Persian diplomats with the contemporary relationship between Athens and the Macedonians, in order to argue that the play, and specifically it's treatment of Knemon, serves as a cautionary tale on the dangers of isolation and self-sustainability.

This political reading of the play is also supported by David Wiles, who similarly notes the play's sympathies towards Phokion and the oligarchy. Wiles brings up the fact that Menander was close with Demetrios, who was the ruler of Athens at the time of Menander's writing of the play, and would thus be likely to share Demetrios's ideal in the Aristotelian mean of living within a balance of austerity and economic success. Wiles also notes that the play's usage of the theme of ponos, or labour, is used to create an idealised image of lower-class labour and wealth distribution, which is then paired with the image of the metropolitan oligarch working the fields alongside the lower-class, hence humanising and endorsing them.

Where Wiles differs from Owens, however, is in the broader interpretation of the point of the play, as Wiles argues that the play is somewhat ironic in its presentation of endorsement of oligarchal rule. Specifically, he argues that neither Sostratos nor Knemon truly follow the Aristotelian ideal by the end, especially in the way "Knemon refuses to work as equals with the slaves, while Sostratos relies too much upon them". He thus uses their fate to parallel Demetrios's own succumbing to material decadence, in order to conclude that "social order rests upon chance".

Marriage

P. G. McC. Brown explores the play's themes of love and marriage, particularly in its validity within Athenian society. Brown interprets the romance within the play as a form of idealised dream for the Athenian middle-class audience, though not necessarily impossible. Within the play, Brown notes how Sostratos feels eros, or desire, towards Knemon's daughter, as his desire for her hand in marriage comes on sight, with no understanding of her character, and that the idea of eros, though not directly translatable to the modern idea of love, does appear often as an ideal for marriage. She then points out that the idea of marrying based on sexual and romantic interest amongst both the ultra-wealthy and the poor was absolutely feasible within Athens, using inter-cousin marriages and religious events as an example of mixed-gender interactions that can feasibly lead to marriages based on attraction, rather than for material gain. Brown then links this to the class demographic of the audience, though she is ultimately unable to give a conclusive answer on the reality of the play's ideals on love and marriage.

Cheryl Anne Cox interpretation of the play seems to support Brown's vision of love as an ideal of Athenian marriage, as she instead approaches the play in terms of its historical representation of mixed-class marriages and the way it ties the rural and the metropolitan. Specifically, she notes that Sostratos's family is relatively rural in their depiction, despite his characterisation as an urban figure. As evidence, she quotes the prologue of the play and highlights Callipides role as a wealthy landowner of the area and his wife's act of making sacrifices within the countryside. Cox then notes the historical commonality of wealthy urban families who own rural land who intermarry with those who live close to their agricultural holdings, as well as those same rural families intermarrying with those within the general vicinity, which she then uses to compare and contrast Kmemon and Callipides' marriages. This historical phenomenon is highlighted when she notes that Kmemon marries local and adopts Gorgias in order to bind their families, while Sostratos' eventual marriage also results in the binding of two rural families, but results in a large difference in wealth that wasn't present in Kmemon's marriage. Both marriages matches the aforementioned historical pattern of rural intermarriage.

This then leads to a debate on the historical validity of class-divided marriages, with Cox using the example of Demochares of Leuconoion, a city dweller, marrying off his daughter to an unnamed land owner in the same Phyle, among other examples, to establish the existence of city-rural intermarriages. Furthermore, she notes the example of an inter-class marriage between Eteoboutad Lycurgus IV and Callisto, a woman of higher class whose land was relatively close to his, as well as Lycurgus' granddaughter, who married Cleombrotus II, who had family that owned nearby land. With its validity established, she then goes on to note the reasons for these relationships, with her using the example of an oration, Lysias 19, in order highlight popular sentiments towards such acts as a matter of "allying oneself to a family of small or smaller means but of good repute", as shown through the speaker's family marrying off their daughters to lower-class men of relative renown.

== Manuscripts ==
Dyskolos is the only one of Menander's texts that has survived nearly completely intact—the papyrus being written in the 3rd century AD. Other plays, such as Samia, Aspis, Heros, Epitrepontes, and Perikeiromene have survived in fragments. Fragments of the Dyskolos currently exist in the Vatican Library in Vatican City and the Bibliothèque Bodmer (Bodmer Library) in Cologny, Switzerland.

== Modern performance ==
The first modern major performance of Dyskolos was in Sydney, Australia. On 4 July 1959, the University of Sydney Classical Society, at Wallace Theatre, Sydney University, performed Dyskolos.

== Translations ==
- George Theodoridis, 2013: full text
- Vincent J. Rosivach, 2014: full text
