= Daos =

Daos or DAOS may refer to:

- Daos, a Phrygian slave character in the ancient Greek comedy Aspis
- Daos, a character in the Lufia video game series
- Dame Alice Owen's School, a secondary school in the United Kingdom
- Détachement ALAT des opérations spéciales, part of French Army Special Forces Command
