= Phrygian slave =

Various ancient figures are referred to as Phrygian slaves, or even the Phrygian slave:

- Aesop, 6th century BCE, the putative author of Aesop's fables
- A character in Euripides' Orestes (play), 5th century BCE
- Daos, 4th century BCE, a character in Aspis (Menander) and other plays of Menander
- Saint Onesimus, 1st century CE, a slave of Philemon of Colossae (Phrygia)
- Epictetus, 1-2nd century CE, a philosopher
