= Colin François Lloyd Austin =

British classical Greek scholar (1941–2010)

Colin Austin
- Colin Austin; Photograph by James Austin
- Born: 26 July 1941; Melbourne, Australia
- Died: 13 August 2010 (aged 69)
- Education: Lycée Lakanal, Sceaux; Manchester Grammar School; Jesus College, Cambridge; Christ Church, Oxford
- Occupation: Scholar of ancient Greek

Colin François Lloyd Austin, FBA (26 July 1941 – 13 August 2010) was a British scholar of ancient Greek.

== Biography ==
Austin was born in Melbourne, Australia, in 1941, the second son of Lloyd James Austin (1915–1994) and of Jeanne-Françoise (née Guérin). A few years later the family moved to France and then to Great Britain. He was educated at the Lycée Lakanal, Paris, Manchester Grammar School, Jesus College, Cambridge, and Christ Church, Oxford, where Sir Hugh Lloyd-Jones supervised his DPhil on Aristophanes. He won the Hallam Prize in 1961, the Browne Medal in 1961 and the Porson Prize in 1962. In 1965, the year in which he gained his doctorate, Austin returned to Cambridge as Research Fellow of Trinity Hall, where he then served as Director of Studies in Classics until 2005, and as University Lecturer (from 1969), Reader (from 1988) and finally as the holder of a personal chair as Professor of Greek (1998–2008) in the Faculty of Classics. In 1983 he was elected a Fellow of the British Academy. He died on 13 August 2010.

Colin Austin's main works were related to Thesmophoriazusae by Aristophanes and Menander. Austin's commentary on Thesmophoriazusae was published by the Oxford University Press in a 2004 edition co-edited by S. Douglas Olson. Austin was the first publisher (1967) of the new portion of Euripides' tragedy Erectheus, extracted from a mummy casing in Paris. He was also the first publisher (1969) of the first and third plays from the Bodmer Codex of Menander: Samia "The Woman from Samos", and "Aspis", "The Shield". In partnership with Rudolf Kassel, Austin started in 1983 the comprehensive edition of the Greek Comic Dramatists, Poetae Comici Graeci (PCG). Volumes published up to 2001 provide some 4,500 pages of surviving texts of more than 250 authors with commentary.
