= Cairo Codex =

The Cairo Codex is a fifth-century manuscript discovered in 1907 that contained the first significant fragments of plays by the ancient Greek playwright Menander. Found near the village of Kom Ishgaw, it included large parts of Epitrepontes (The Arbitration), Perikeiromene (The Girl with her Hair Cut Short) and Samia (The Girl from Samos), as well as some hundred lines of Heros (The Hero), and sixty-four lines of an otherwise unknown play.

The codex was found by the French egyptologist Gustave Lefebvre, during excavations at Kom Ishgaw. The site is better known to papyrologists as the source of the sixth-century archive of the poet and lawyer Dioscorus of Aphrodito. The Menander codex had been used by its later owners as a kind of stopper, sealing a jar in which about 150 papyrus documents belonging to the Dioscorus archive were stored. Lefebvre brought the surviving leaves to the Egyptian Museum in Cairo, where the codex has remained ever since, giving the manuscript its name.

Lefebvre published the first edition of the codex in Fragments d'un manuscrit de Ménandre (1907), and followed it with a revised text including photographic plates, Papyrus de Ménandre (1911). A full photographic edition of the manuscript, prepared under the supervision of H. Riad and Abd el-Kadr Selim with a preface by Ludwig Koenen, was published by the Institute of Classical Studies of the University of London as The Cairo Codex of Menander: A Photographic Edition (1978). Together with later papyrus finds, the Cairo Codex allowed classicists for the first time in over a millennium to assess Menander's dramaturgy, plotting, and characterization directly.
