= Epitrepontes =

Comic play by Menander

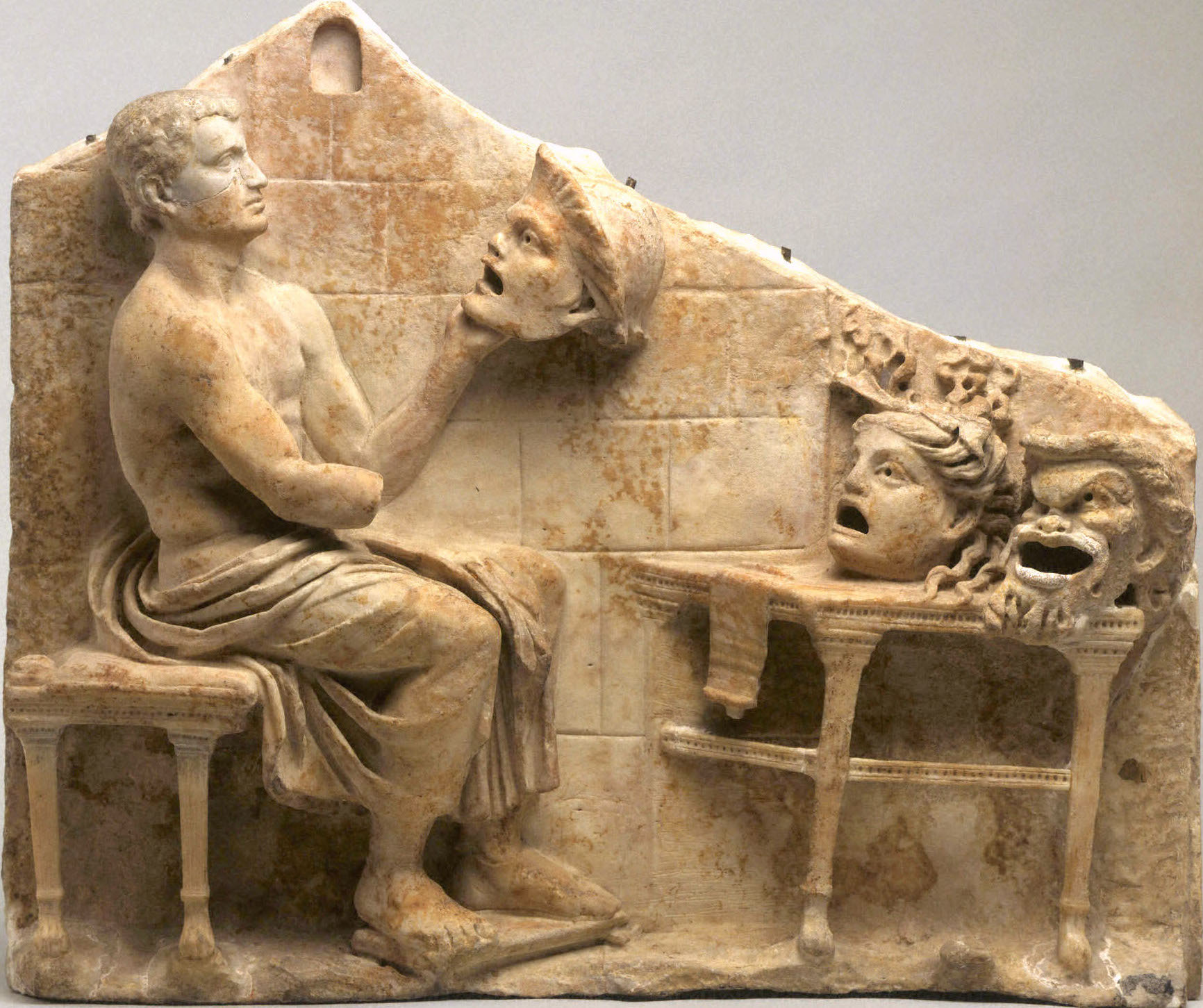
- Written by: Menander
- Characters: Charisios, Pamphile

Epitrepontes (Greek: Ἐπιτρέποντεϲ, translated as The Arbitration or The Litigants) is an Ancient Greek comedy, written c. 300 BCE by Menander. Only fragments of the play have been found, primarily on papyrus, yet it is one of Menander's best-preserved plays.

Fragments of roughly 750 lines, accounting for about half of the play, were found in 1907, alongside Perikeiromene and Samia in the Cairo Codex. Additional fragments of the play have been found since its initial discovery. In 2012, the Michigan Papyrus was published, giving better readings to Acts 3 and 4 of the play.

Epitrepontes (Greek: "arbitration") features a conflict - and attempts to resolve that conflict - between two Athenian households, as well as depicting conflicts in a marriage. The play's most famous incident features a comical scene of legal arbitration. Two parties want the court to decide who should take ownership of goods found alongside an abandoned baby. The play gradually reveals the baby's history, and the identity of its parents, in the process of a complex exploration of marriage and family. The play also features sexual assault.

== Plot ==
Pamphile, a young Athenian woman, gives birth to a child only five months after her wedding to her husband Charisios. In shame and fear for her marriage and familial reputation, she has her servant abandon the baby (as was an accepted practice in contemporaneous Greek society), along with tokens in the form of jewels, to aid the baby's future identification. At the time of the birth, Charisios was away on a business trip, and would not have known that a child was born at all, if not for his slave, Onesimos, telling him of seeing the child being abandoned. Charisios suspects Pamphile of infidelity, and leaves her. He moves in with a neighbour, Chairestratos, and begins to spend money, including Pamphile's dowry, on drinking and carousing (including taking up with a hetaera named Habrotonon). Unbeknownst to him, the child was actually his own, the result of rape at a festival.

Daos, a shepherd, finds the baby and jewels abandoned in a field, and although he initially takes him home, he later gives the child to Syros, a charcoal-burner, whose wife had recently lost their baby. Syros claims the jewels that came with the child, accusing Daos of trying to keep them for himself. Daos argued that since he found the child, the jewels should be his. They ask Smikrines to arbitrate and decide what should be done. After hearing both sides, Smikrines rules in favor of Syros, declaring that the jewels belong to the baby, as the child might come from a noble background, so they are essential to its identity. After the judgment, Daos bitterly hands over the jewels. As Syros examines them, Onesimos enters and recognizes a ring, as it belongs to his master, Charisios.

Furious that Chairos is wasting Pamphile's dowry, her father, Smikrines, demands she divorce Charisios. Pamphile loyally refuses. Charisios overhears this, leading him to feel deep guilt for his actions. Meanwhile, Habrotonon enters carrying the baby, revealing to Pamphile that she knows the baby's true parentage. She confirms that the baby belongs to Pamphile and Charisios, resolving the confusion. Charisios begins to accept the truth, and reunites with Pamphile. Smikrines also reconciles with Charisios, and peace is restored to the family.

== Characters ==
- Charisios, a young Athenian gentleman
- Chairestratos, Charisios' friend and neighbour
- Onesimos, Charisios' servant
- Pamphile, Charisios' wife
- Smikrines, Pamphile's father
- Habrotonon, a hetaira
- Syros, Chairestratos' servant, a charcoal-burner
- Daos, a shepherd
- Karion, a cook
