= Sikyonioi =

Comic play by Menander

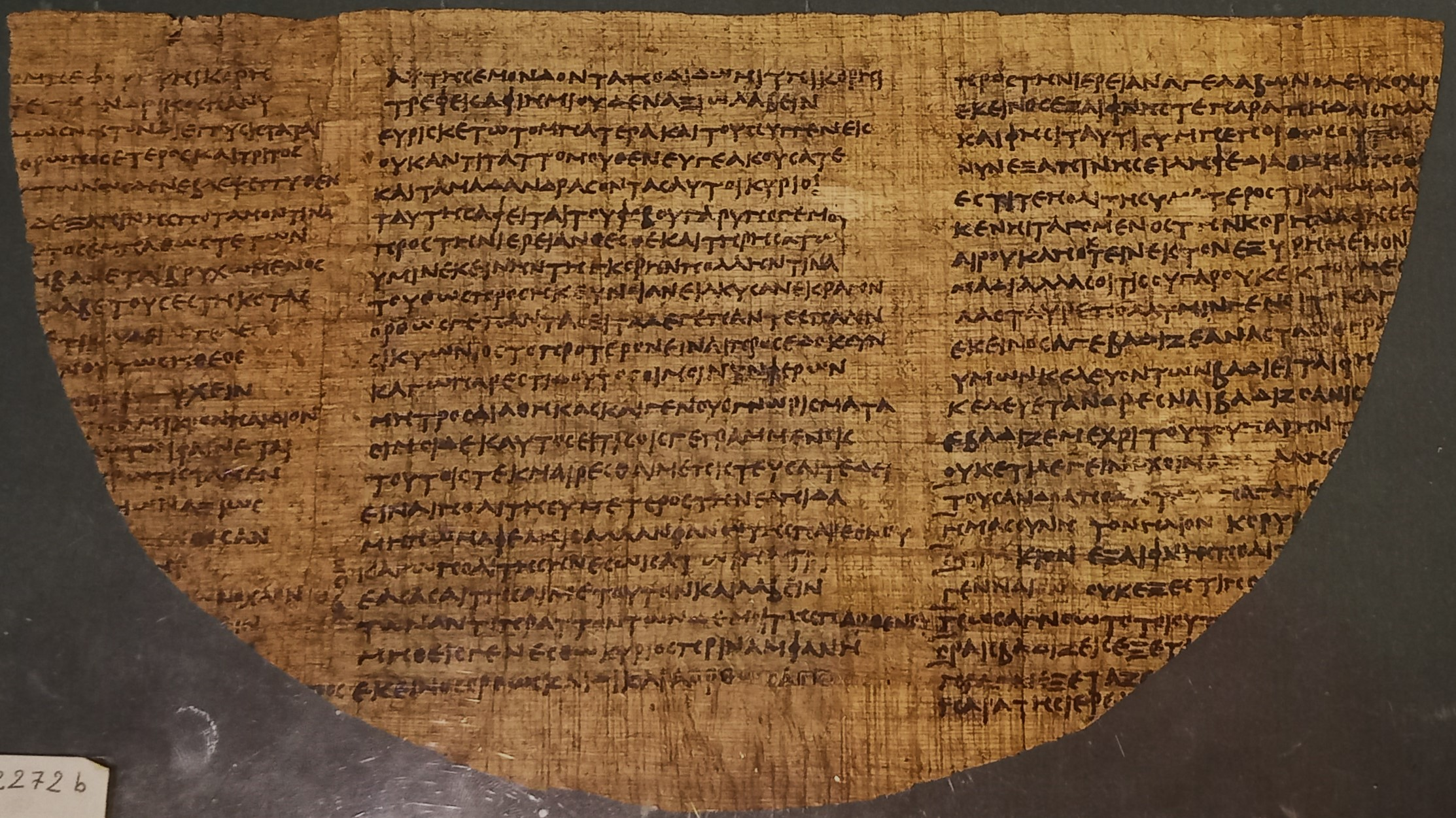
Papyrus of the Sikyonioi found at Medinet-el-Ghoran, 3rd Century BC. Institute of Papyrology of Sorbonne University.

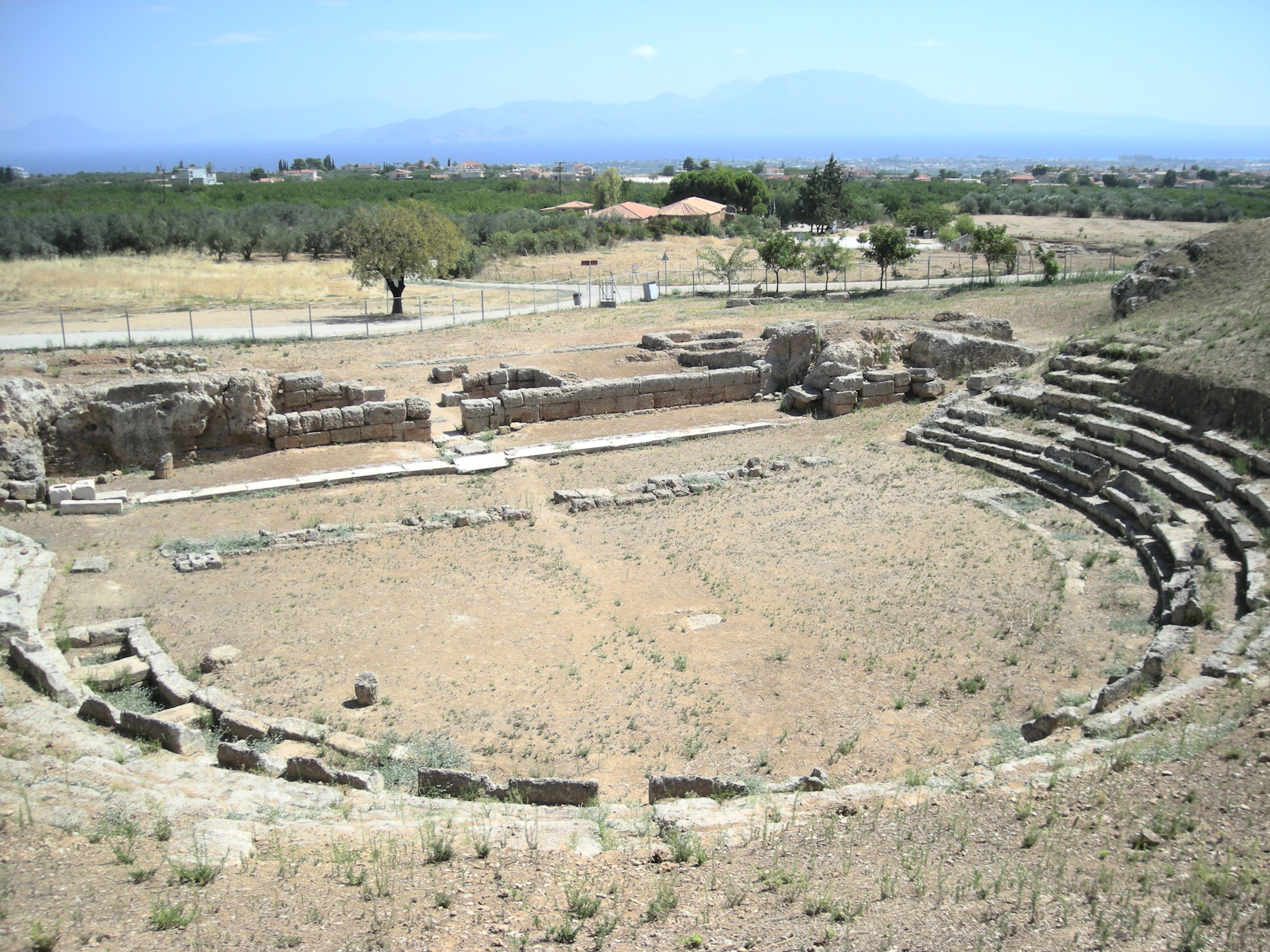
The ancient theatre of Sikyon

Sikyonios or Sikyonioi (Greek: Σικυώνιος/Σικυώνιοι), translated as The Sicyonian(s) or The Man from Sicyon, is an Ancient Greek comedy by Menander. About half of the play has survived in fragments of papyrus used to stuff several mummies in the cemetery of Medinet-el-Ghoran in the Faiyum, where they were discovered in 1901 by Pierre Jouguet. The first acts are almost completely lost, but the rest, although the manuscript is often corrupt, lacunose and hard to read, allows a fair reconstruction of the plot.

== Plot ==
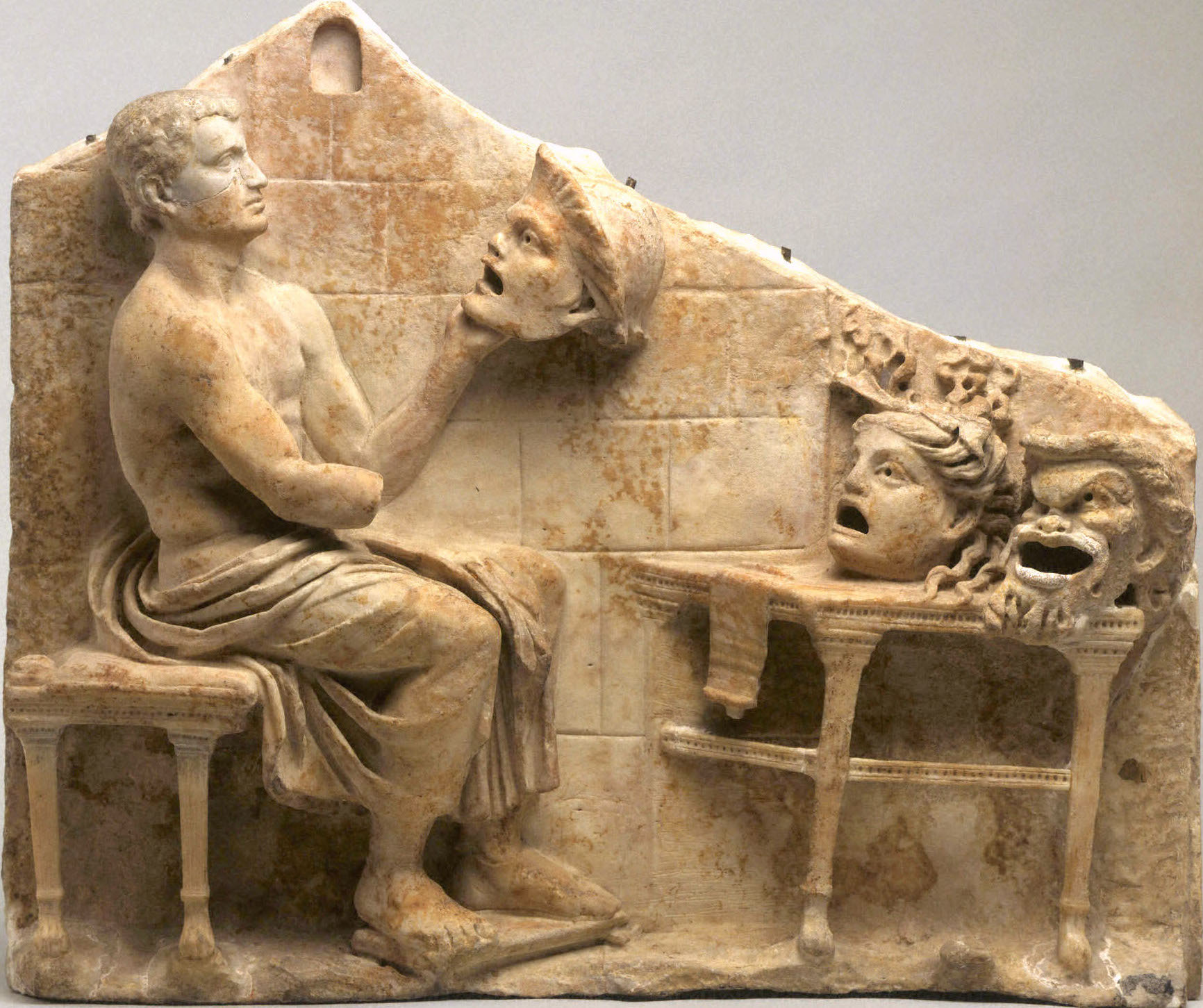
Roman, Republican or Early Imperial, Relief of a seated poet (Menander) with masks of New Comedy, 1st century B.C. – early 1st century A.D., Princeton University Art Museum

Sikyonioi takes place in a street in Attica, probably in the demos of Eleusis, facing the houses of Kichesias and Smikrines, two Athenians who have reversed their luck, as the once rich Kichesias has grown poor and the poor Smikrines has become rich.

In the prologue speech the divinity has exposed how twelve years earlier the four-year-old Philumene, together with her nurse and the slave Dromon, was kidnapped by pirates from her father's estate on the coast of Attica and sold at Mylasa in Caria to a wealthy Sicyonian named Hegemon.

The action probably started with a conversation between Theron and his love interest Malthake, during which the audience learns that Theron is the parasite of Stratophanes, a mercenary soldier who has lately arrived from a successful campaign in Asia Minor. In the first act Stratophanes starts his search for a young slave girl who had previously been in his family's custody. Belonging to his late Sicyonian father Hegemon, the girl was educated like a lady and Stratophanes fell in love with her, but now, due to an important lawsuit lost by his father, her fate is uncertain as the property of the slaves is claimed by the Boeotian plaintiff.

When the girl takes refuge in a temple at Eleusis, the old slave in her company claims that she is an Athenian, and a pale beardless young man offers himself as her protector. But then Stratophanes steps up to declare that she belonged to his family. He implores the Eleusinian assembly to be given more time allowing to prove that she is actually an Athenian, which would save her from the Boeotian, but also make it impossible for the Sicyonian to marry her.

Toward the end of act three, however, Stratophanes' slave Pyrrhias reports him the last words of his mother who revealed on her dying bed that he was adopted from an Athenian family. When the slave also brings documents to prove his master's descent, Stratophanes exclaims: "At first I thought I too was a Sicyonian; but here is this man who now brings me my mother's testament and the proofs of my true birth. And I myself believe - if I am to infer from what is written here and to credit it - that I too am your fellow-citizen. Do not yet deprive me of my hope; but if I too am proved to be a fellow citizen of the girl whom I preserved for her father, allow me to ask him for her and to get her. And let none of my antagonists get the girl into his power before he is revealed."

Stratophanes then instructs Theron with the search and the parasite tries to cheat him by paying poor Kichesias to act as her father. At first Kichesias rejects the offer, but then Philumene's slave Dromon arrives to confirm that he is actually the father of the girl.

In act five Stratophanes confronts Smikrines and his pale son Moschion, who has been his rival with the girl, but at the end of their quarrel, when the proof for his Athenian birth is produced, the family recognizes that he is actually Moschion's elder brother given away to the Sicyonians by his father Smikrines when he was poor. As Kichesias consents, Stratophanes is finally free to marry his beloved Philumene.

== Characters ==
- Stratophanes, captain of mercenaries
- Smikrines, Athenian citizen, Stratophanes' father
- Moschion, Smikrines' son
- Theron, parasite attached to Stratophanes
- Pyrrhias, Stratophanes' servant
- Donax, Stratophanes' servant
- Malthake, Stratophanes' mistress
- Kichesias, Athenian citizen
- Philumene, Kichesias's daughter, kidnapped in childhood
- Dromon, Kichesias's servant, kidnapped with Philoumene
- Blepes, democrat
