= Papyrus Oxyrhynchus 211 =

Greek papyrus fragment

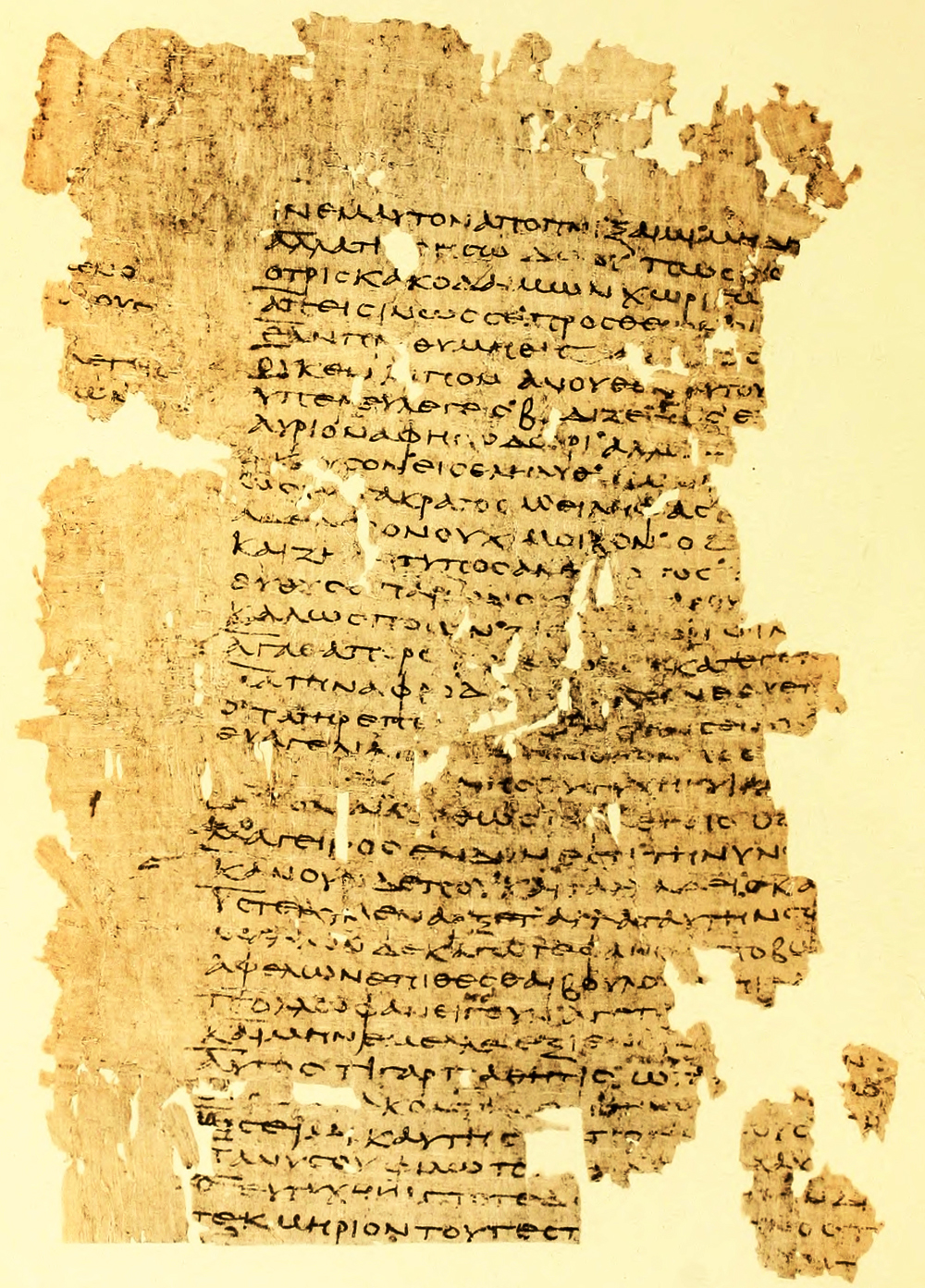
A papyrus fragment of the Perikeiromene 976–1008 (P. Oxy. II 211)

Papyrus Oxyrhynchus 211 (P. Oxy. 211 or P. Oxy. II 211) is a fragment of the Perikeiromene (976–1008) of Menander, written in Greek. It was discovered in Oxyrhynchus. The manuscript was written on papyrus in the form of a roll. It is dated to the first or second century. Currently it is housed in the Houghton Library (3734) of Harvard University.

== Description ==
The document was written by an unknown copyist. The measurements of the fragment are 334 by 132 mm. It contains a fragment of a lost comedy: the conclusion of Menander's Perikeiromene (The Girl with her Hair Cut Short). The text is written in a round uncial hand. There is a tendency to separate words.

The manuscript was revised by a second hand, probably a contemporary, whose handwriting is generally cursive. The second hand is responsible for the punctuation.

There are a few misspellings (e.g. ΕΥΑΓΕΛΙΑ in line 18) and the wrong insertion of two iotas adscript in line 45. The occurrence of the Attic forms in a manuscript of the Roman period are remarkable.

It was discovered by Grenfell and Hunt in 1897 in Oxyrhynchus, together with a large number of documents dated in the reigns of Vespasian, Domitian, and Trajan. The text was published by Grenfell and Hunt in 1899. The manuscript was re-examined by Gerald M. Browne in 1974.

== See also ==
- Oxyrhynchus Papyri
- Perikeiromene
- Papyrus Oxyrhynchus 210
- Papyrus Oxyrhynchus 212
