= Samia (play) =

Comic play by Menander

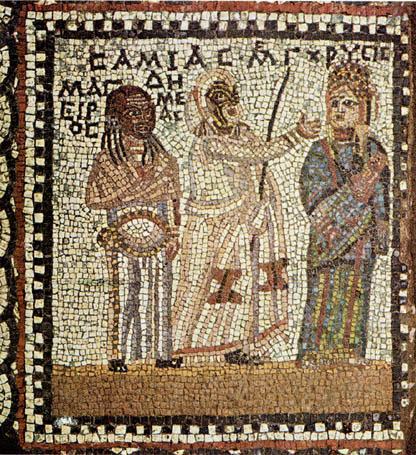
- A scene from Act 3 of Menander's Samia on a mosaic (late 3rd or early 4th century AD)
- Original title: Σαμία
- Original language: Ancient Greek
- Written by: Menander
- Characters: Moschion, young man, son of Demeas; Demeas, neighbor of Nikeratos, father of Moschion; Parmenon, demeas and Moschion servant; Chrysis, the Samian girl, Demeas's mistress; Nikeratos, young woman, daughter of Nikeratos; Chef, cooks for the wedding
- Genre: New Comedy

Premiere
- Date: 315/309 BC

Samia (Ancient Greek: Σαμία), translated as The Girl From Samos, or The Marriage Connection, is an Ancient Greek comedy by Menander, who lived from c. 341/2 - 290 BC. It is the dramatist's second most extant play with up to 116 lines missing compared to Dyskolos’s 39. The date of its first performance is unknown, with 315 BC and 309 BC being two suggested dates. The surviving text of Samia comes from the Cairo Codex found in 1907 and the Bodmer Papyri from 1952.

== Plot ==
Samia takes place in a street in Athens, outside the houses of Demeas, a wealthy bachelor, and Nikeratos, his less wealthy business partner. Prior to the events in the play Demeas had taken in a Samian girl, Chrysis, as his mistress despite misgivings. Chrysis becomes pregnant and was under orders from Demeas to dispose of the illegitimate child. At the same time Moschion, the adopted son of Demeas, seduced the daughter of Nikeratos, Plangon, and she too is pregnant. Both babies are born around the same time. Unfortunately, Chrysis' baby dies and she takes Plangon's to nurse instead.

Act 1 starts with the events being narrated in a prologue speech by Moschion, at the outset of the play Nikeratos and Demeas are away on a business trip. When the play begins Chrysis is overhearing a conversation between Moschion and his father's servant Parmenon regarding the return of Nikeratos and Demeas. Moschion is nervous about facing his father as he wishes to ask his father's permission to marry Nikeratos' daughter. When the two men return from their trip they have already made just such a marriage arrangement for Moschion and Plangon.

In act 2, Moschion is mentally preparing for the wedding, while Demeas finds the child within his house and believing it to be Chrysis', kept against his will, wishes to expel her from his house. Moschion convinces him to keep the child and broaches the question of marriage. Demeas is pleased at Moschion's willingness to go along with his plan and they agree to have the wedding that very day.

However, in a speech which opens act 3 of the play, Demeas relates how in the course of preparations he overheard Moschion's nurse remarking that the child was Moschion's, and seeing Chrysis breastfeeding the child was sufficient to convince him that Moschion had had an affair with his mistress. Demeas consults Parmenon about it but his anger frightens the servant into silence and he is unable to gain any reliable information. The aggression of Demeas and the fear of Parmenon result in a misunderstanding as Parmenon admits the child is Moschion's but does not reveal that the mother is Plangon, and that Chrysis is only nursing it. Demeas, not wishing to blame Moschion, accuses Chrysis of seducing him. When he confronts Chrysis there is a further misunderstanding as Demeas, wishing to keep the scandal secret, does not explicitly say he believes she seduced Moschion, instead he evicts her from his house because she kept the baby.

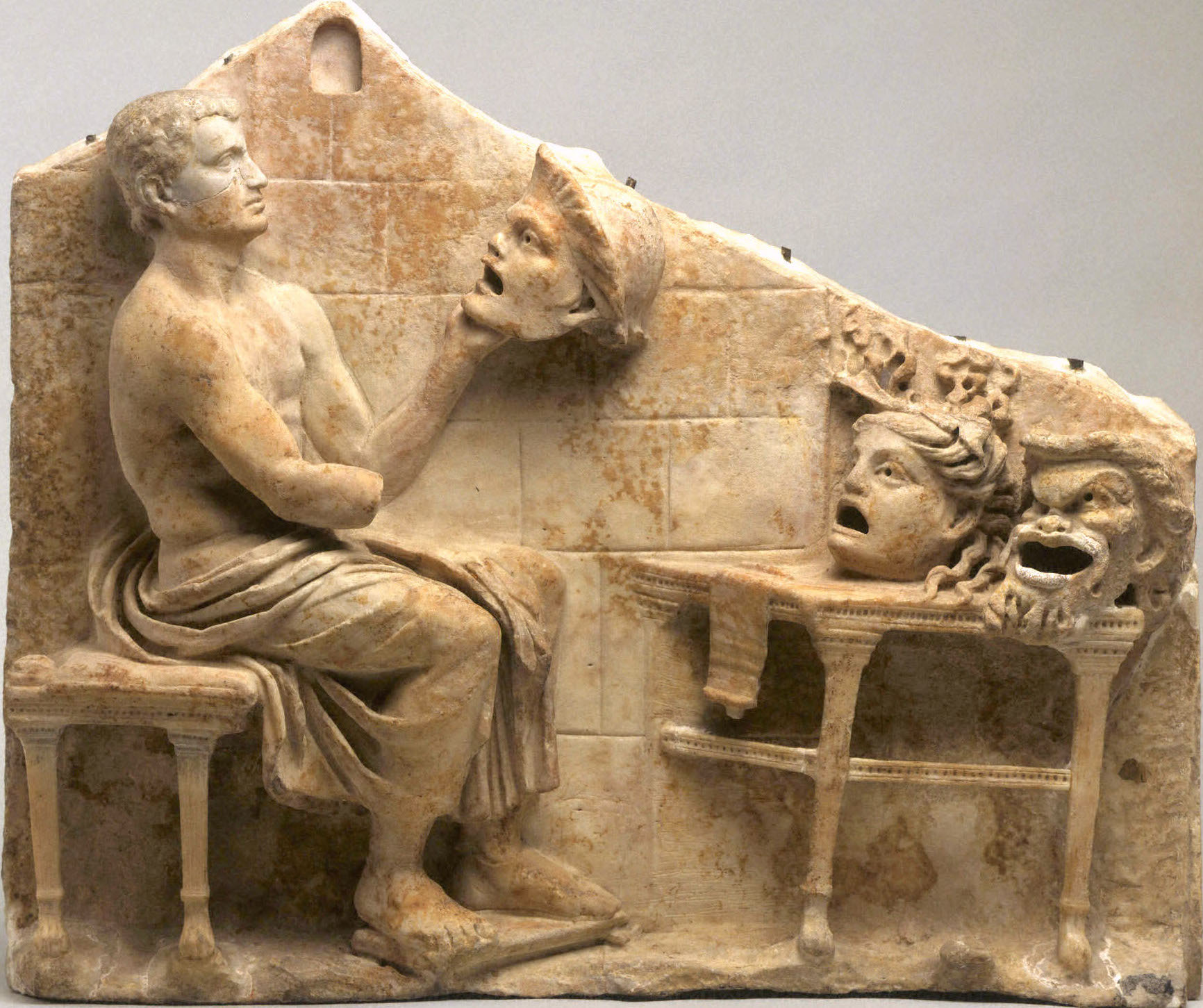
Roman, Republican or Early Imperial, Relief of a seated poet (Menander) with masks of New Comedy, 1st century B.C. – early 1st century A.D., Princeton University Art Museum

In act 4, the whole of which is in the lively trochaic tetrameter metre, Nikeratos takes pity on Chrysis: he escorts her into his house and takes a mediating role. However, like Demeas, he possesses only half the truth. He questions Moschion who informs Nikeratos that Demeas has evicted Chrysis and eagerly tries to hurry ahead the wedding plans despite the current turmoil. Demeas arrives and Moschion and Nikeratos both question him about Chrysis, they both wish for her to be returned to the house. However, Demeas’ unspoken assumption about Moschion and Chrysis having an affair causes him to become enraged yet again. Demeas then admits that he knows the child is Moschion's but again, does not mention Chrysis. This specific misunderstanding ignites a debate between the three men, with Nikeratos leaving to remove Chrysis from his house as he has been led to believe the same as Demeas. At this point Moschion admits to his seduction of Plangon to them and that the child is theirs.

This revelation ends the conflict between Demeas and Moschion. However, Nikeratos returns after having seen his own daughter feeding the baby. Moschion flees the scene and Nikeratos, believing that his wife and daughter have turned against him in support of Chrysis, goes to kill them. Chrysis flees from his house carrying the baby and Demeas ushers her into his own. He then proceeds to placate Nikeratos and convinces him to proceed with the marriage as planned.

In act 5, despite being reconciled with his adoptive father Moschion is upset that Demeas would think to accuse him of seducing Chrysis, he decides that he is going to leave Athens and join the military. However, after a comic scene with Parmenon, Demeas arrives and confronts Moschion, apologizing for the assumptions he made. Nikeratos also arrives and there is a brief altercation as the old man believes Moschion is trying to run away from the wedding. This is quickly put to rest and the marriage proceeds as planned.

== Theme ==
The theme of this play is to view the relationship between the father and son. Despite Moschion not being the real son of Demeas, Demeas loves him as if he was his own. Despite all the misunderstandings, and Demeas wanting to throw Chrysis out, Demeas realizes that he misjudged and asks for forgiveness from Moschion, and Demeas decides to continue with the marriage. Menander is very fond of this type of relationship, as he is famous for quoting, “Father is he who raised the child, not he who sired it." He also uses this theme in other plays, such as Dyskolos.

== Discussion ==
=== Moschion's prologue ===
In contrast to Dyskolos, Epitrepontes, Perikeiromene and other, more fragmentary plays, the prologue of Samia is given by a human character. By having Moschion deliver the opening exposition the audience is given a subjective opinion, not objective divine omniscience. This is a more technically sophisticated method, but its suitability depends on the plot of the play. Given that this is a play driven by miscommunication between characters, the bias of this prologue highlights the distinction between what Moschion leads us to expect and what actually takes place. Furthermore, Moschion knows all the cast of Samia as they are his family and neighbors and therefore he can introduce them all, whereas in Dyskolos a divinity is needed as no human character can introduce all those involved to an audience.

=== Social and legal context ===
Samia, like much of New Comedy operates in a social sphere, drawing on legal and social practice to provide the plot. The social misdemeanor that sets the events of the play in motion at a fast pace is Moschion's seduction of Plangon. Although Moschion formally confirms that the child is his own, it is illegitimate. An illegitimate child within a play by Menander must be made legitimate by the conclusion as it is required by the natural justice of the play. The legal device used here, and also in Epitrepontes, is that a child conceived by a couple prior to their wedding will become legitimate after the wedding; this is why Moschion acts with such haste to ensure the marriage takes place before his actions are discovered.

However, the fate of the child is entirely ignored by Menander in the closing scene, forcing scholars to speculate about its future. Two different viewpoints have been adopted. The child could be returned to its natural parents or stay in the care of Chrysis. The reasons for Menander's silence on the matter could stem from a lack of dramatic interest in the child or from conclusions that were self-evident to an ancient audience but not a modern one.

== Structure ==
Menander pioneered the five-act structure frequently observed in modern plays. Playwright Gustav Freytag would later use this model to create his "dramatic arc" used to identify the five-act structure. Previously, Greek writers such as Aristophanes used two acts separated by a parabasis, in which all actors exited the stage and the chorus directly addressed the audience. While Samia is not completely intact, its use of five distinct acts remains an example of Menander's revolutionary work for literature.

== Translations ==
- Eric G. Turner, 1971, verse, available for digital loan
- D.M. Bain, 1983, available for digital loan
- W. G. Arnott, 2000: Menander. Volume III. The Loeb Classical Library 460.
