= Misoumenos =

Comic play by Menander (c. 300 BCE)

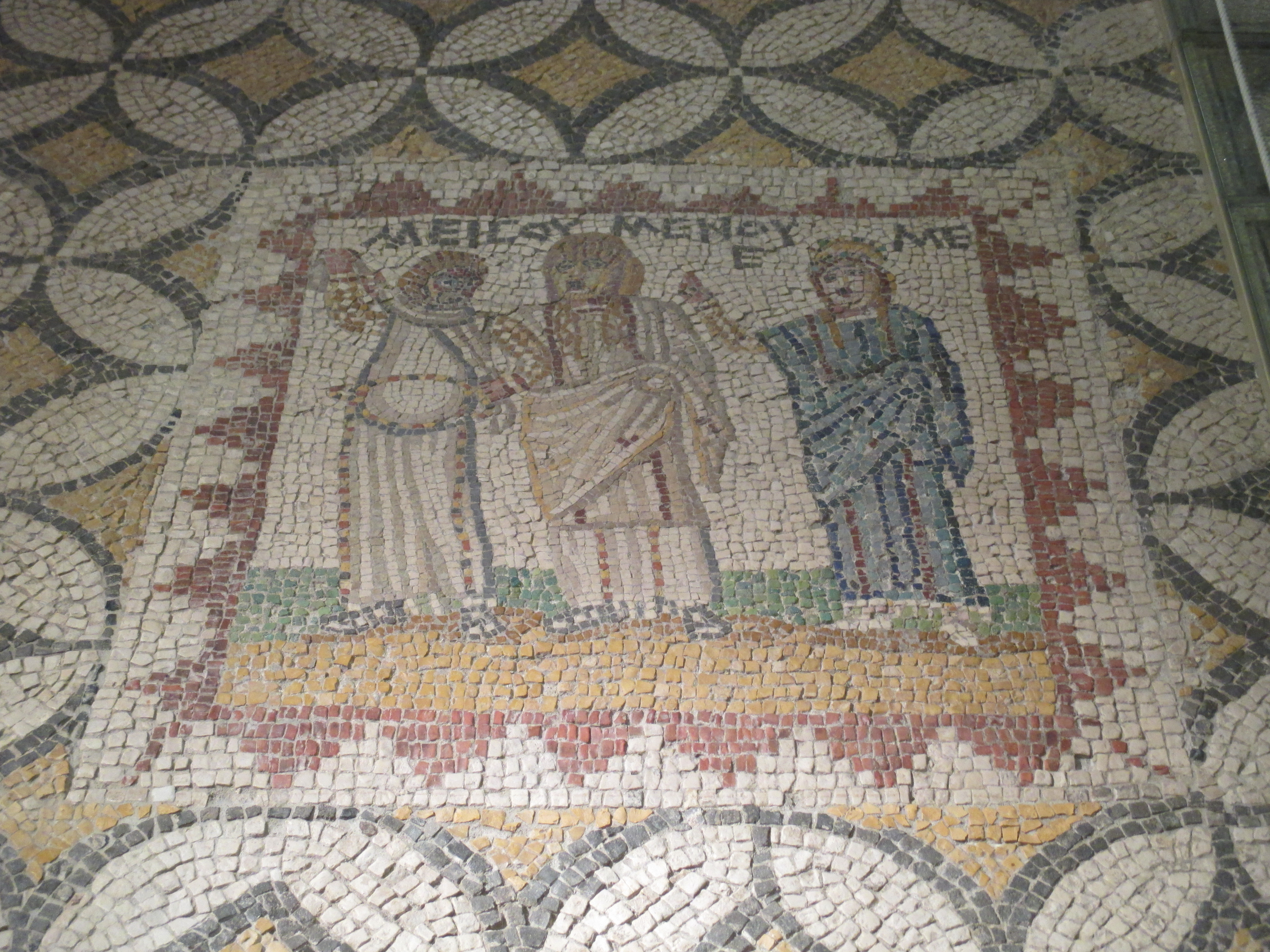
- Roman mosaic floor with a scene from Misoumenos, Archaeological Museum of Mytilene
- Original title: Μισούμενος
- Original language: Ancient Greek
- Written by: Menander
- Characters: Thrasonides, Krateia
- Genre: New Comedy

Misoumenos (Greek: Μισούμενος), translated as The Hated Man, is an Ancient Greek comedy by Menander (342/41 – 292/91 BC). Once considered lost, fragments of more than 400 verses of the play have been found. However, most of these are seriously damaged, making it difficult to reconstruct the plot of the play. Separate lines from the prologue also survived by being quoted by later writers.

The surviving sources do not provide information regarding the time when the play was written and staged. At the same time, one of the fragments mentions royal power in Cyprus, which was abolished in 310/309 BC, so the action of the play takes place no later than this moment. Modern scholars date the play to approximately 300 BC.

Misoumenos seems to have been very popular in late antiquity, judging from the numerous papyrus fragments that have been recovered. A scene from act 5 of the play is depicted in a mosaic in the House of Menander.

== Plot ==
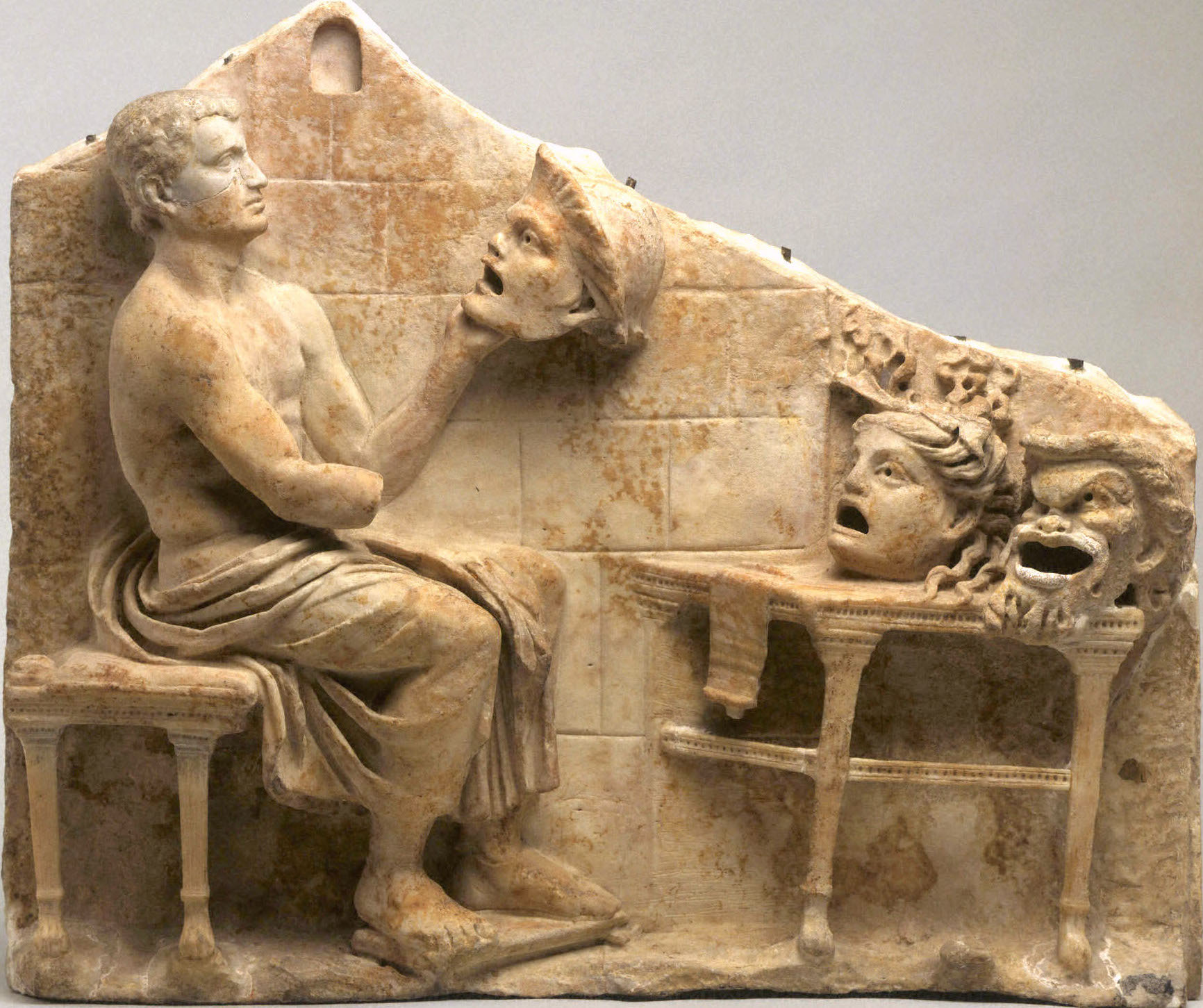
Relief of a seated poet (Menander) with masks of New Comedy, 1st century BC – early 1st century AD.

Thrasonides, a mercenary soldier, buys a young slave named Krateia and falls in love with her, but does not want to take her by force. He grants her freedom and lavishes her with numerous presents. Despite his gestures, she does not reciprocate his love. Invoking the Night, he voluntarily stays in the open outside his own house. His servant, Getas, joins him, expressing concern and trying to persuade Thrasonides to go inside and rest. Krateia persists in hating him, but she withholds the cause for her feelings. She, wrongly, holds the belief that Thrasonides was responsible for her brother's death. Thrasonides' desperation intensifies, ultimately leading to him contemplating suicide.

Later, Krateia reunites with her father Demeas, who arrived in Athens in search of his daughter and who stays overnight in the house of Kleinias, the soldier's neighbor. Thrasonides, fearful of Demeas’ judgment, prepares to meet him, worried that if Demeas refuses to approve of his relationship with Krateia, his life will be ruined.

Krateia remains hostile to her lover, even after he declares himself in the presence of her father. However, she finally learns that her brother is alive. Overjoyed, Krateia expresses her desire to marry Thrasonides. Demeas formally gives his daughter to Thrasonides for marriage, along with a dowry. He then celebrates his good fortune and invites everyone to a wedding feast.

== Characters ==
- Thrasonides, mercenary soldier
- Krateia, freed slave loved by Thrasonides
- Getas, Thrasonides's servant
- Demeas, father of Krateia
- Kleinias, friend of Demeas
- Syra, slave of Kleinias
- Chrysis, Krateia's nurse
- Brother of Krateia

== Bibliography ==
- Q. Cataudella, Misoumenos di Menandro negli Oxyrhynchus Papyri, in «St. It. Filol. CI.», 41 (1969), pp. 56–60.
- W. G. Arnott, Menander. II, The Loeb Classical Library, Harvard U.P., 1996, pp. 245–363 (critical text, translation and commentary).
- E. Bonollo, Alcune osservazioni sui personaggi del Misoumenos di Menandro, in "Prometheus. Rivista di Studi Classici", XLV (2019), pp. 89–103.
