= Aspis (Menander) =

Ancient Greek comedy by Menander

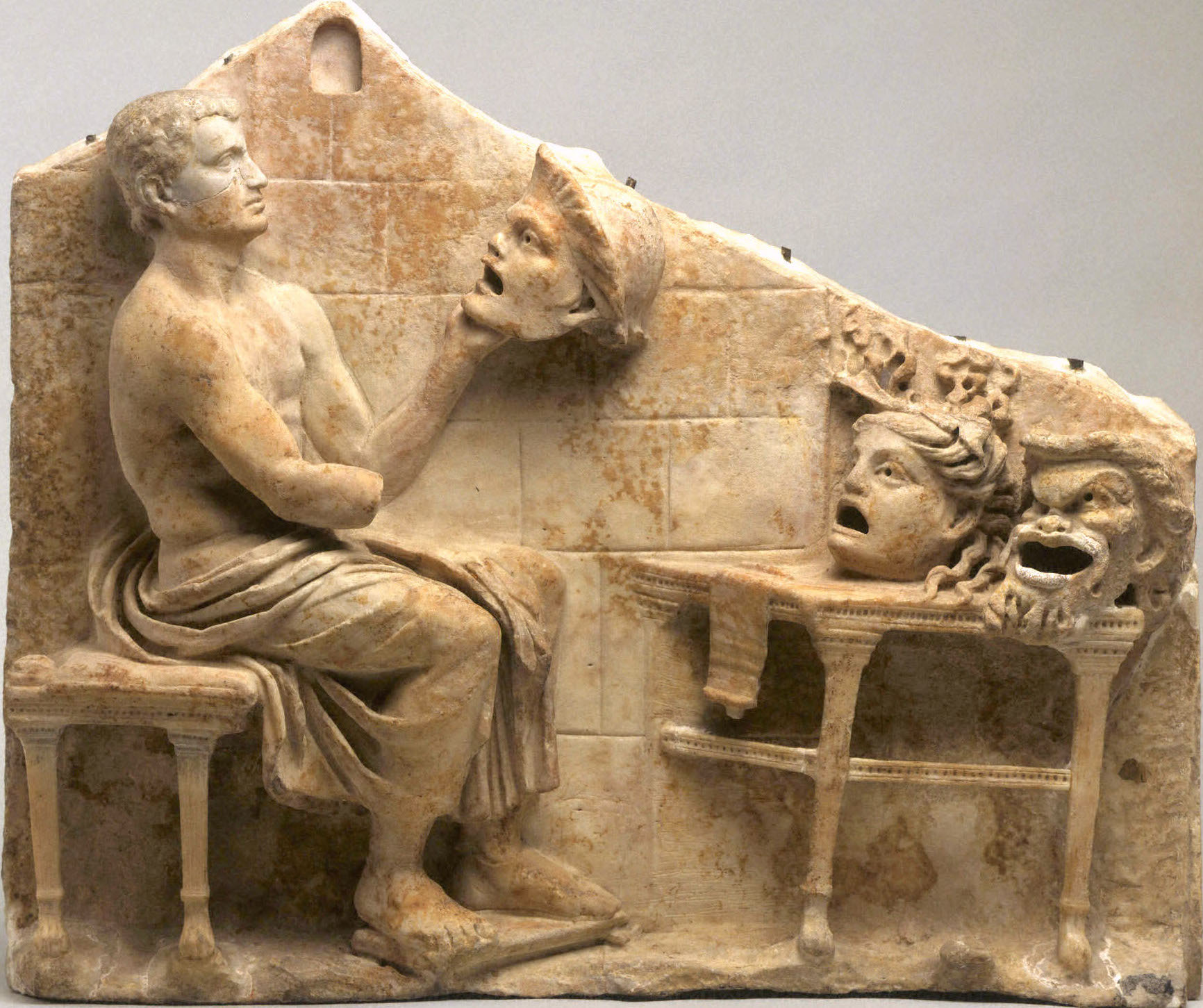
Roman, Republican or Early Imperial, Relief of a seated poet (Menander) with masks of New Comedy, 1st century BC – early 1st century AD, Princeton University Art Museum

Aspis (Greek: Ἀσπίς), translated as The Shield, is an Ancient Greek comedy by Menander (342/41 – 292/91 BC) that is only partially preserved on papyrus. Of a total of c. 870 lines, about 420 lines survive, including almost all of the first and second act and the beginning of the third act. It is unknown when and at which festival the play was first performed.

== Plot ==
Set in Athens, the play is a comedy of intrigue that revolves around a greedy old miser, Smikrines, and two decent but impoverished young people, the mercenary soldier Kleostratos and his sister.

Kleostratos' loyal slave, Daos, returns from war in Asia Minor with his master's battered shield; he believes that Kleostratos has fallen in battle (in a delayed prologue, the goddess Chance soon assures the audience that Daos is mistaken). The soldier's greedy uncle, Smikrines, wants to get his hands on the soldier's rich booty that Daos brought back as well. So he declares that he will marry the soldier's heiress, his sister. Smikrines invokes an Athenian law that obliges the oldest male relative to marry an orphaned heiress (epikleros). This is devastating news to Chaireas, who is in love with the girl and was supposed to marry her, and his stepfather, Chairestratos, who happens to be Smikrines' younger brother.

A clever plan by Daos saves the situation. Daos stages a false funeral for Chairestratos, claiming that he died of a broken heart and left his daughter heiress of his huge fortune. Smikrines then reconsiders, betrothes Kleostratos' sister to Chaireas, and wants to marry his other niece instead. At this point, the soldier Kleostratos, who had only been taken captive, returns. As a result, there are two engagements: Kleostratos is betrothed to Chairestratos' daughter, and Chaireas to Kleostratos' sister.

The ending is lost. There are hints that a cook was called to prepare for a wedding feast, and Daos and the cook may have schemed to punish Smikrines. The end would probably have included the final defeat and humiliation of the greedy Smikrines.

== Characters ==
- Kleostratos, mercenary soldier, nephew of both Smikrines and Chairestratos, believed dead
- Daos, elderly slave of Kleostratos
- Smikrines, old miser, Kleostratos’ uncle
- Chairestratos, younger brother of Smikrines
- Chaireas, step-son of Chairestratos
- A friend of Chaireas, disguised as a physician
- Tyche (Chance), divine prologue speaker
- A cook
- A waiter
- Spinther (Spark), cook’s assistant
- Group of Lycian captives
- Slaves of Chairestratos
- Chorus of drunken revellers

== Themes and issues ==
The Solonic law regarding orphaned heiresses (epikleroi) was a popular topic in Greek and Roman New Comedy. Apart from Menander's Aspis, the law also plays a role in Terence's Phormio and Adelphoe, and there were numerous other plays with titles such as Epikleros ("Heiress"), including two by Menander, or Epidikazomenos ("The man to whom an estate and its heiress are adjudged"). The latter was, for example, the title of the play by Apollodorus of Carystus that inspired Terence's Phormio.

Menander's Aspis affirms the democratic values of its Athenian audience by portraying marriage as a reward for some, but not for other characters. Smikrines' regard for money rather than morals or good social relations marks him as an oligarch, and the play implicitly connects his oligarchic ideology with impotency and infertility.

As a mercenary, Kleostratos himself also does not automatically fit the ideal of a comic lover. Elsewhere in Menander (Perikeiromene and Misoumenos), the mercenary needs to be socialized before he can become an acceptable husband. The fact, however, that Kleostratos is a mercenary not by choice but out of necessity (he enlisted to win a dowry for his sister, Aspis 8-9) shows that his mercenary service is not a reflection of his character, and that makes him a worthy husband after all.

In general, Menander's comedy regards mercenary service as "threatening to dissolve identity, as well as the demographic and cultural foundations of the polis." Accordingly, Menander repeatedly uses the tools of the mercenary's trade as "tokens of misrecognition". In Aspis 69-73, for example, Daos falsely interprets the shield that he finds on the battlefield next to an unidentifiably bloated corpse as a sign that its owner, Kleostratos, has died.

== Pictorial evidence ==
A second century BC wallpainting on the west wall of a large room (room N) in the House of the Comediens (La Maîson des Comédiens) on Delos shows three scenes from New Comedy. The one least well preserved (metope c) shows a standing man and a slave holding a shield. It probably represents the opening scene of Menander's Aspis.

== Text editions and commentaries ==
- Arnott, W. Geoffrey (1979). Menander, volume I. Loeb Classical Library, 132. Cambridge, Massachusetts: Harvard University Press. ISBN 0-674-99147-8.
- Gomme, Arnold Wycombe; Sandbach, Francis Henry (2003) [1970]. Menander. A Commentary. Oxford: Oxford University Press. ISBN 978-0-19-814197-6.

=== English translations ===
- Arnott, W. Geoffrey (1979). Menander, volume I. Loeb Classical Library, 132. Cambridge, Massachusetts: Harvard University Press. ISBN 0-674-99147-8.
- Balme, Maurice (2001). Menander. The Plays and Fragments. Oxford World Classics. Oxford: Oxford University Press. ISBN 0-19-283983-7.
