= Perikeiromene =

Comic play by Menander (c. 314-313BCE)

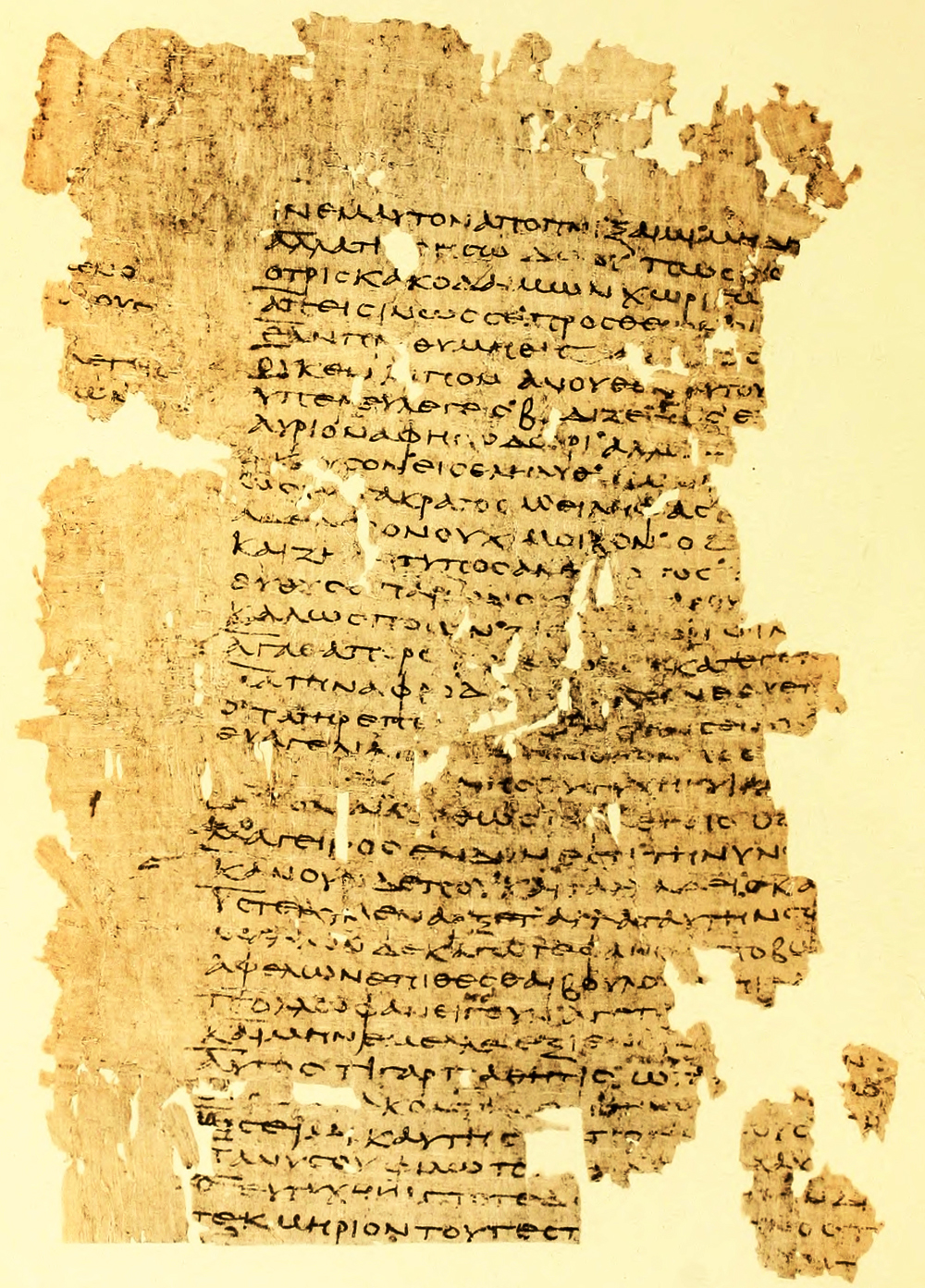
- A papyrus fragment of the Perikeiromene 976–1008 (P. Oxy. 211 II 211, 1st or 2nd century CE).
- Original title: Περικειρομένη
- Original language: Ancient Greek
- Written by: Menander
- Genre: New Comedy

Perikeiromene (Ancient Greek: Περικειρομένη, romanized: Perikeiroménē), translated as The Girl with her Hair Cut Short, is an Ancient Greek comedy by Menander (342/41 – 292/91 BC) that is only partially preserved on papyrus. Of an estimated total of between 1030 and 1091 lines, about 450 lines (between 40 and 45%) survive. No act has been preserved in its entirety, but there are still individual passages from each of the five acts. Most acts lack their beginning and end, except that the transition between act I and II is still extant. The play may have been first performed in 314/13 BC or not much later.

== Plot ==
Probably set in Corinth, the play is a drama of reconciliation. It focuses on the relationship between Polemon, a Corinthian mercenary, and his common-law wife (pallake), Glykera. An act of domestic violence by the soldier triggers a sequence of events that culminates in Glykera's discovery of her father and her reconciliation with and marriage to Polemon.

The lost opening of the play probably featured Glykera's flight from Polemon's house. Recently returned from fighting abroad, the soldier had learned from Sosias, his slave, that Glykera was seen embracing the neighbor's son, Moschion. Moschion has been stalking her because he is in love with her. In a violent fit of jealousy, Polemon cuts off Glykera's long hair. Glykera finds refuge with Myrrhine, the wealthy woman next door.

In a delayed prologue, Agnoia (personified Ignorance) reveals that Myrrhine's son Moschion is, in fact, as only Glykera knows, her brother by birth, which is why she allowed him to embrace her. Moschion was exposed together with her and given to Myrrhine by the same woman, now deceased, who kept and raised Glykera.

In act II, the slave Daos falsely tries to take credit for Glykera's move into their house, and Moschion erroneously hopes that she has decided to become his concubine. He finds, however, that his mother keeps him away from her. In act III, Polemon tries to storm Myrrhine's house at the head of a comical army consisting of several male slaves, a female pipe-player, and a cook with a pig, but his older friend Pataikos talks him out of it.

In act IV, Pataikos tries to negotiate with Glykera at Polemon's request. With Moschion secretly eavesdropping on them, Glykera tells him the truth about the embrace and begs him to retrieve her things for her from Polemon's house, including the baby clothes in which she was exposed. As a result, Pataikos discovers that both Glykera and Moschion are the children he exposed long ago after he lost his fortune and his wife died in childbirth. Consequently, Glykera forgives the contrite Polemon in act V and marries him, whereas Pataikos betroths Moschion to another girl.

== Characters ==
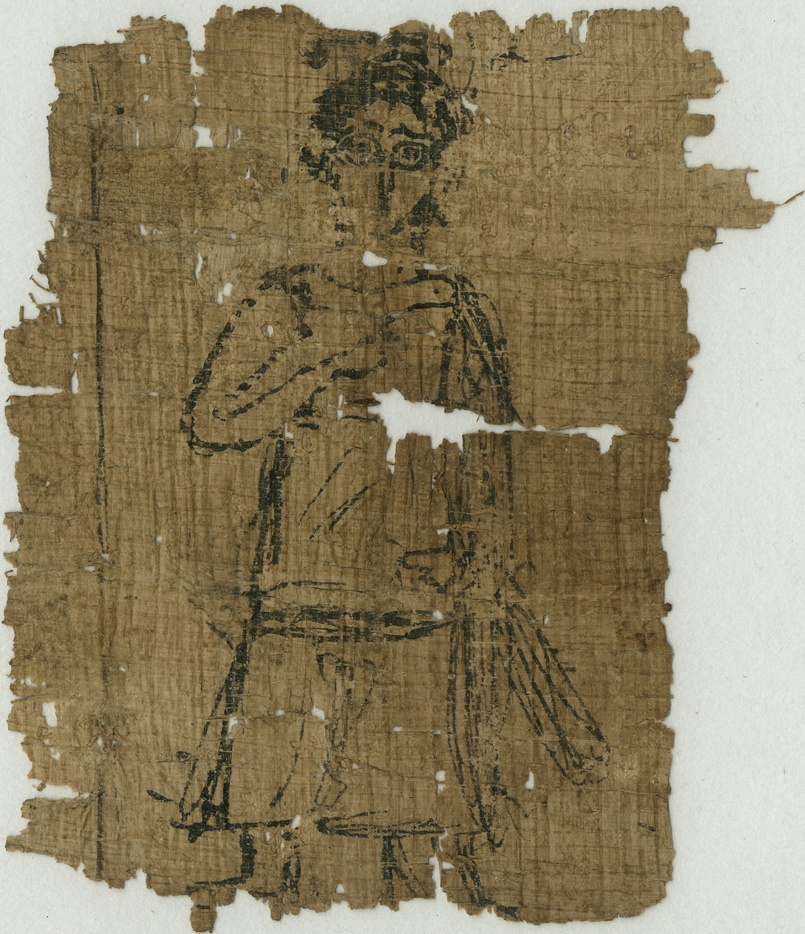
Agnoia (P. Oxy. 2652)

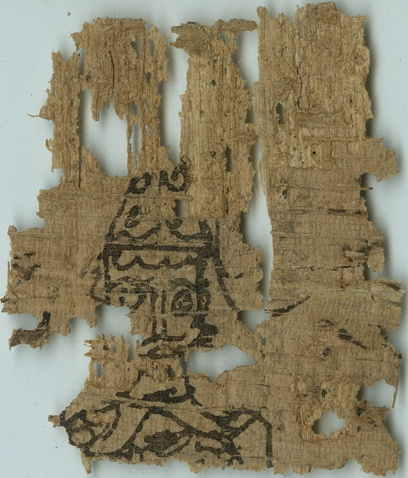
Polemon (P. Oxy. 2653)

- Polemon, mercenary soldier
- Sosias, slave of Polemon or flag lieutenant
- Glykera, Polemon's concubine
- Doris, female slave of Polemon, serving as Glykera's maid
- Moschion, young neighbor, Polemon's rival for Glykera's affections
- Myrrhine, Moschion’s adoptive mother
- Daos, slave of Moschion
- Pataikos, an old Corinthian
- Agnoia (Ignorance), speaker of the prologue
- A cook, dragging a pig
- Habrotonon, female flute-player
- Several slaves, members of Polemon's rag-tag army
- Chorus of drunken revellers

== Themes and Issues ==
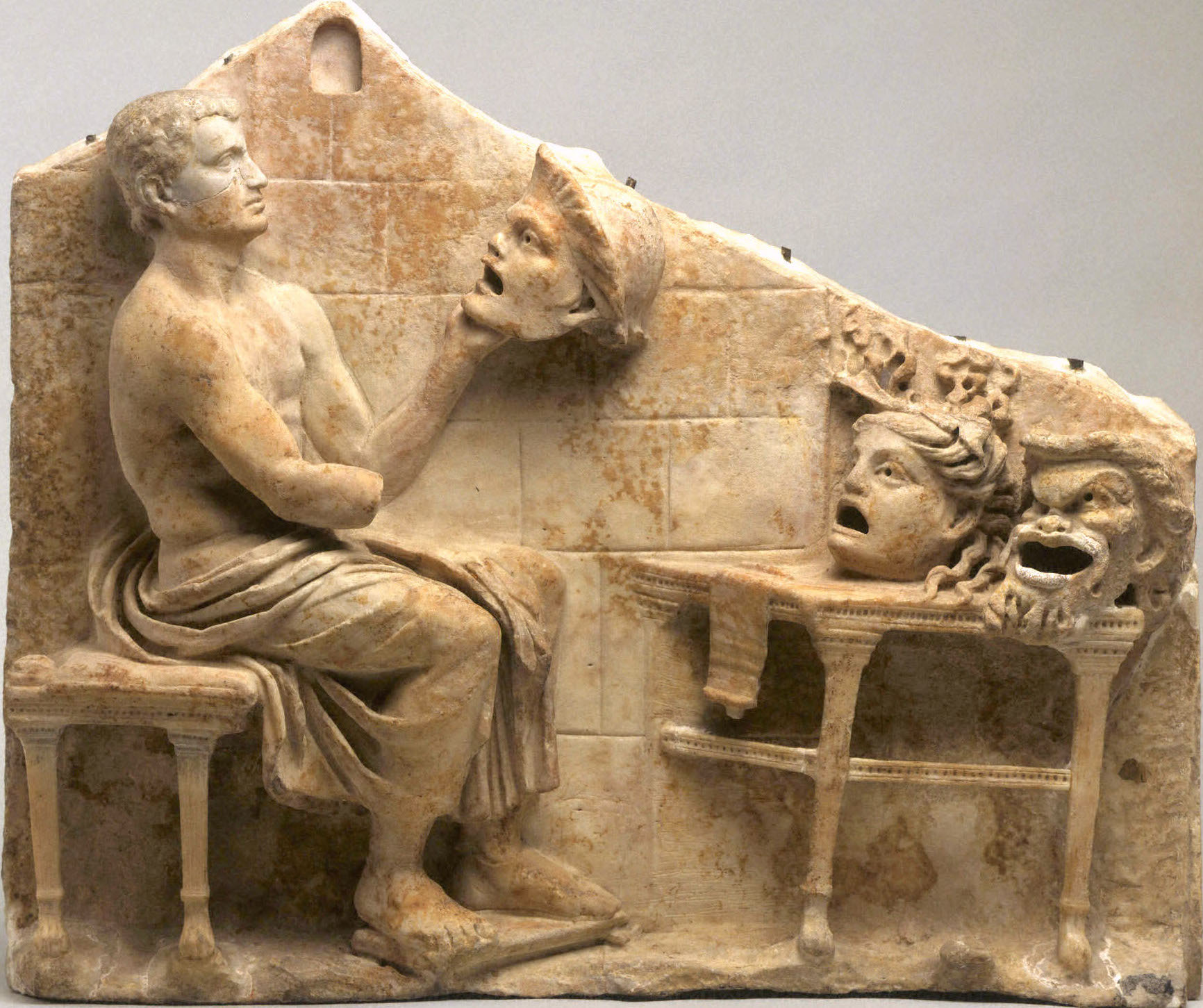
Roman, Republican or Early Imperial, Relief of a seated poet (Menander) with masks of New Comedy, 1st century B.C. – early 1st century A.D., Princeton University Art Museum

The mercenary soldier's comical attack with a rag-tag army consisting of slaves and other non-military figures was a stock scene in comedies featuring mercenaries. In Terence's Eunuchus 771ff., for example, the soldier Thraso unsuccessfully tries to storm the house of the hetaera Thais with an army that includes his parasite, Gnatho, and his cook, Sanga.

Just as in Aspis and Misoumenos, the mercenary soldier in Perikeiromene has to be socialized into the polis before he can marry the romantic heroine. In the end, his future father-in-law suggests that he should renounce mercenary service for good (1016–17).

From the start, however, Polemon seems strangely lacking in martial spirit. It is his slave, Sosia, who leads the attack at the neighbor's house. Similarly, his rival, young Moschion, acts much more like the stereotypical braggart soldier, boasting with his good looks and his success with hetaerae (Pk. 302-303), joking that he would appoint his slave Daos "overlord of Greek affairs/And a marshal of land forces (Pk. 279-80), and finally sending him ahead as a "scout" to do reconnaissance (Pk. 295).

Polemon's act of domestic violence, the forcible haircut, is representative of the violence associated with mercenaries at the time. What redeems him as a potential husband is that Agnoia (Ignorance) in the prologue explicitly claims responsibility for his violent act (Pk. 163-66). Moreover, his behavior is presented as "an aberration rather than an expression of a fundamentally corrupt character" and thus appears pardonable.

In this play, Menander handles the typical formula of separation and reunion in a particularly elegant way. At the very moment when the breakup between Glykera and Polemon seems to be final, with the removal of her belongings from Polemon's house, the recognition scene starts: Pataikos sees her birth clothes and recognizes Glykera as his daughter, and this in turn leads to her reconciliation with Polemon.

Another important feature of the recognition scene is that it parodies tragic pathos. At line 779, the conversation between Pataikos and his daughter turns into a typically tragic stichomythia in which the characters take turns speaking one line at a time. In addition, the characters quote famous snippets of Euripidean tragedy comically out of context (line 788: Euripides, Wise Melanippe, frg. 484.3 KT; line 809: Euripides, "Trojan Women" 88).

With the happy ending, all the role of all the main characters is transformed. They all start out as figures on the margins or even outside of city-state society, but at the end they assume more conventional roles within that society. Glykera turns from a concubine with unclear citizenship into a citizen wife. Polemon, a mercenary soldier with changing alliances, becomes a settled husband and polis citizen. Pataikos, a childless widower, assumes a position at the head of a family, and even Moschion will turn from a philandering young man into a respectable husband.

== Pictorial evidence ==
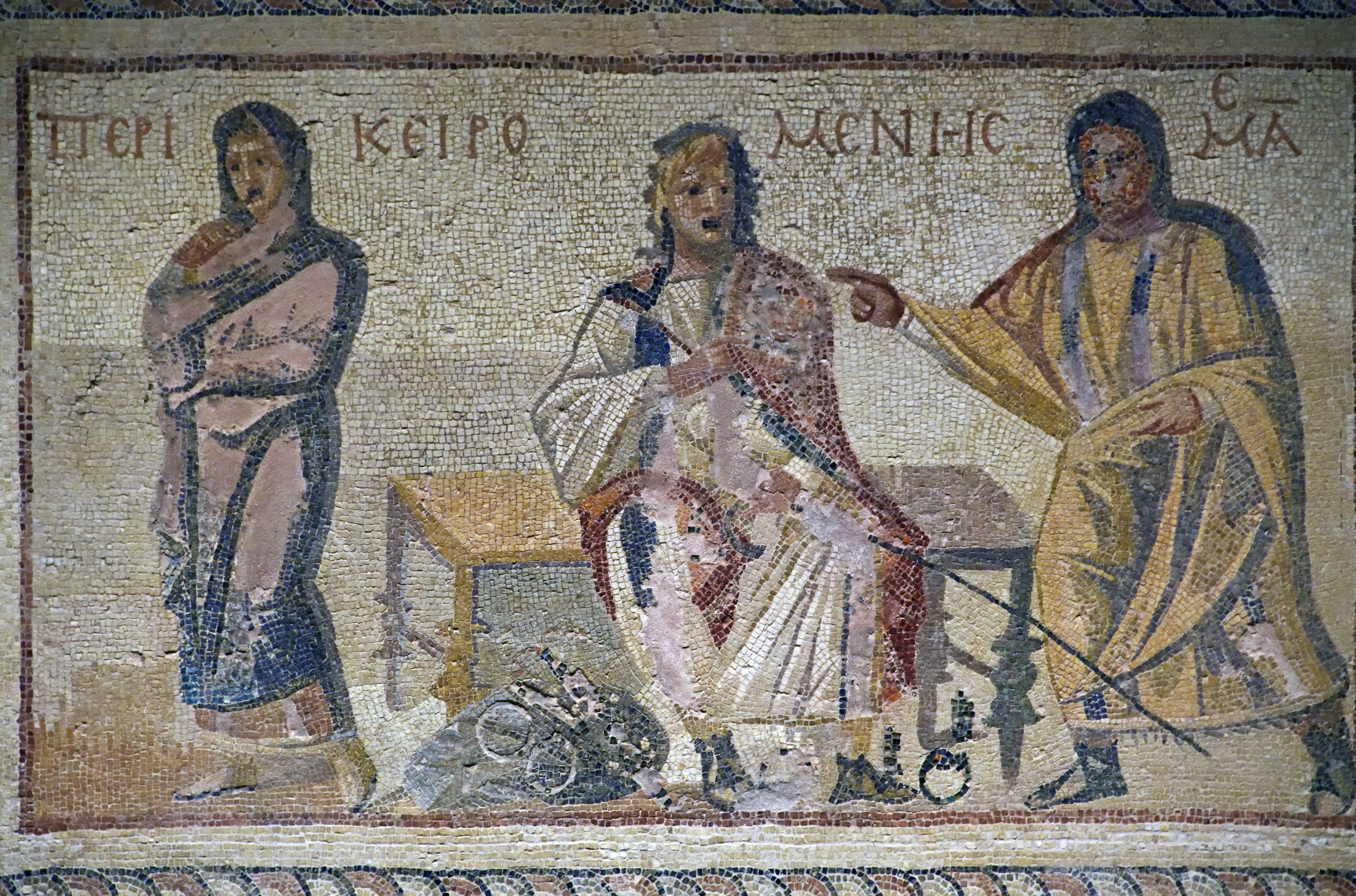
Mosaic from Antioch depicting a scene from Perikeiromene. The woman to the left is identified as Glykera. The man in the middle the soldier Polemon. The man to the right the attendant, Sosias.

Two ancient representations depicting the play's opening scene have been found so far. Both are inscribed Perikeiromene. One is a faded 2nd-century AD wall-painting on red ground in the reception room of a Roman terrace house, the so-called "Hanghaus 2", in Ephesus (Apartment I, Insula 2). The other one, recently discovered in Antioch, is a 3rd-century AD mosaic identifying not only the play but also the act. From left to right, one sees a woman who has pulled her cloak up so that it covers her hair, a young, unbearded man in a military-style cloak (chlamys) sitting on a dining couch and looking at her (Ephesus) or the audience (Antioch), and an old man raising his right arm "in an emotional gesture" (Ephesus) or clearly pointing at the soldier (Antioch).

In addition, two papyrus fragments from Oxyrhynchus contain ink drawings that illustrated characters from the play. They probably belonged to the same illustrated manuscript. P.Oxy. 2652 offers a frontal view of a woman tagged as Agnoia. P.Oxy. 2653 represents the face of a young soldier, obviously Polemon, in a helmet with cheek-pieces.

== Reception and influence ==
Karakasis notes that the Perikeiromene seems to have had a widespread distribution throughout the ancient Roman world, citing mentions by Philostratus (Epist. 16) and Ovid (Amores I.7).

Korzeniewski suggests that Calpurnius Siculus' Third Eclogue is influenced by the Perikeiromene.

== Text editions and commentaries ==
- Arnott, W. Geoffrey (1996). Menander, volume II. Loeb Classical Library, 459. Cambridge, Massachusetts: Harvard University Press. ISBN 0-674-99506-6.
- Gomme, Arnold Wycombe; Sandbach, Francis Henry (2003) [1970]. Menander. A Commentary. Oxford: Oxford University Press. ISBN 978-0-19-814197-6.

=== English translations ===
- Arnott, W. Geoffrey (1996). Menander, volume II. Loeb Classical Library, 459. Cambridge, Massachusetts: Harvard University Press. ISBN 0-674-99506-6.
- Balme, Maurice (2001). Menander. The Plays and Fragments. Oxford World Classics. Oxford: Oxford University Press. ISBN 0-19-283983-7.
