= Yuri Skorupsky =

Ukrainian-American painter, monumentalist (born 1965)

- Юрій Олександрович Скорупський
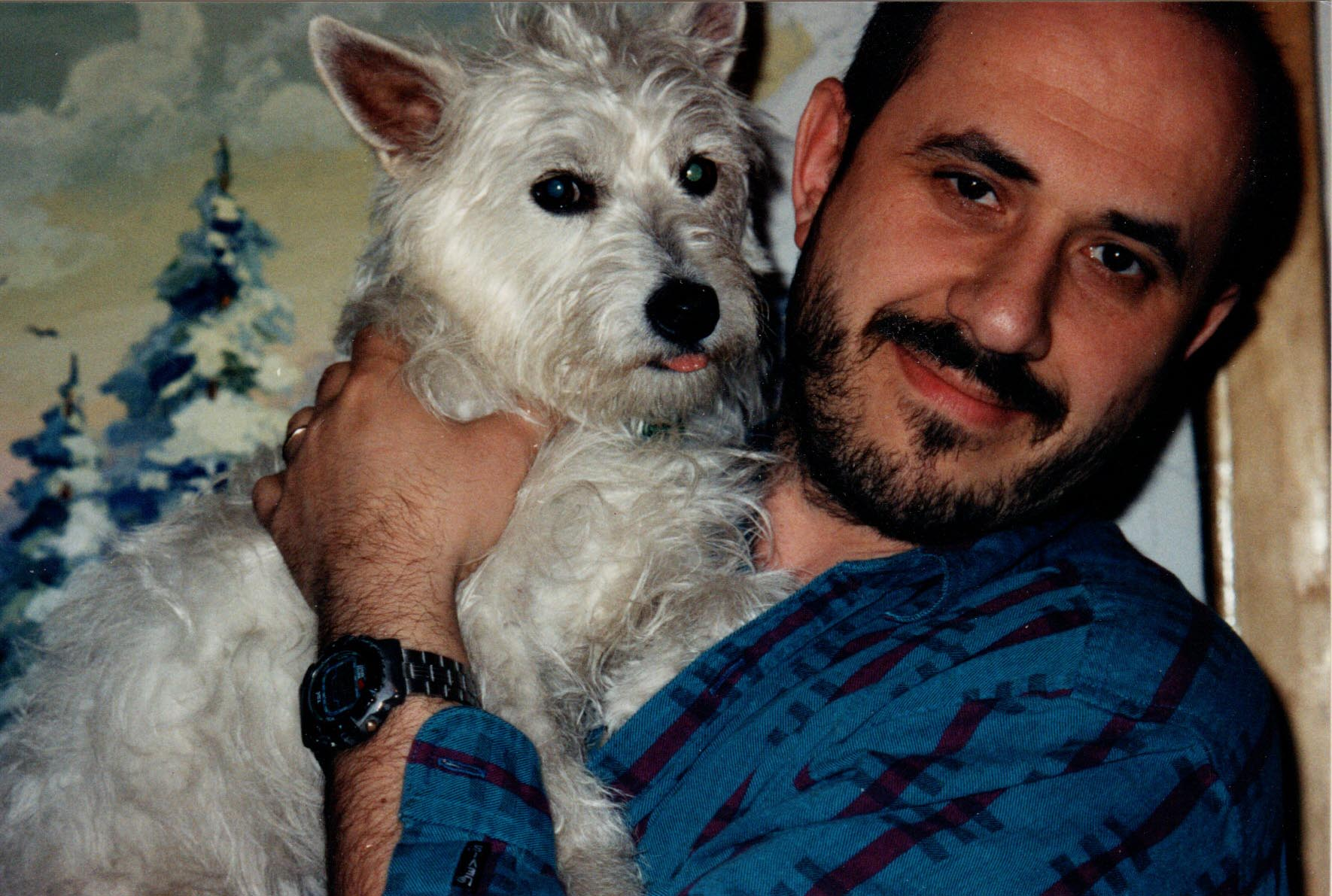
- Born: 13 May 1965 (age 61); Rava-Ruska, now Lviv Oblast, Ukraine
- Education: Yaniv Art School, Moscow State Institute of Culture, Lviv State Institute of Decorative and Applied Arts
- Occupations: Painter, monumentalist

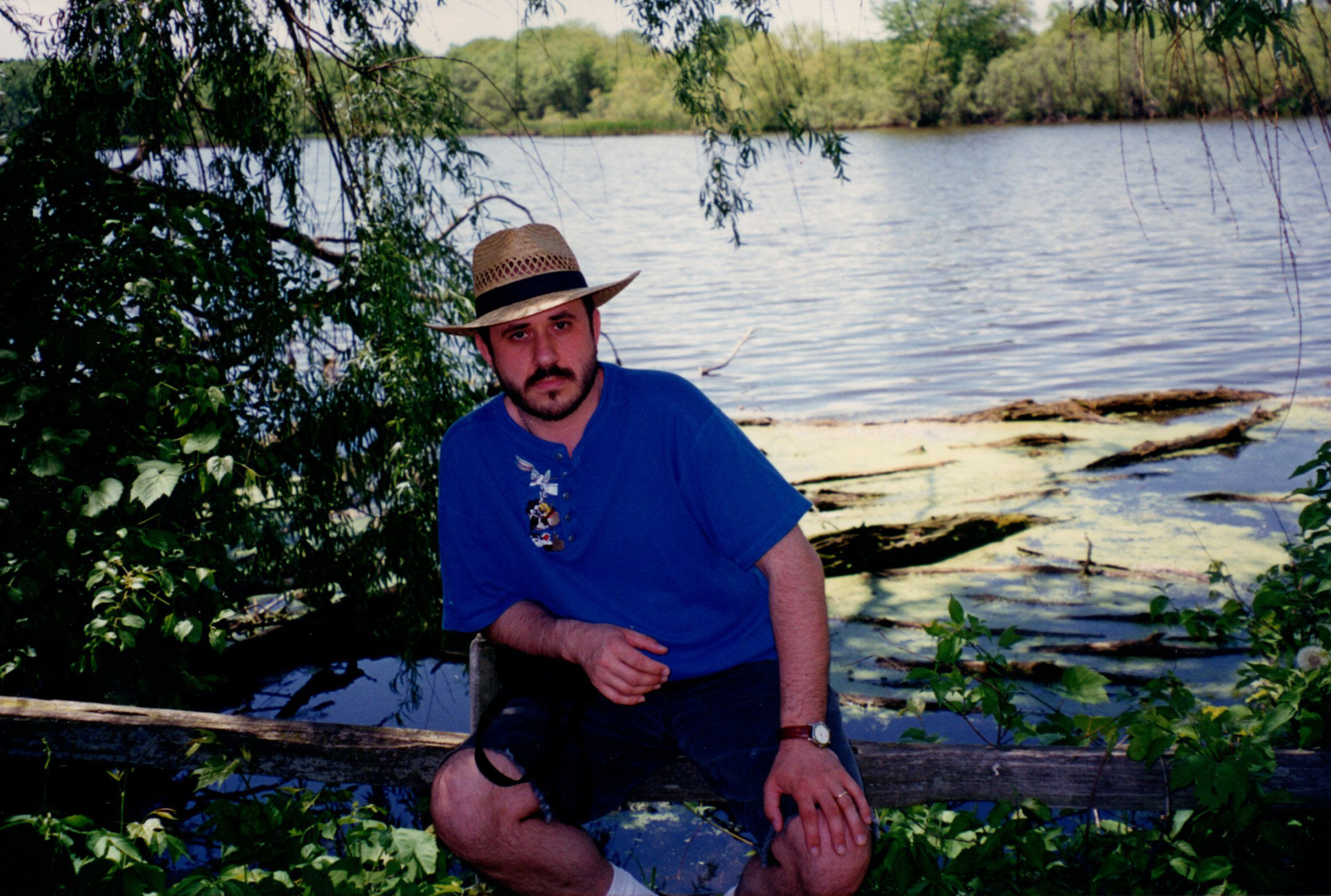
Yuri Skorupsky by the pond

Yuri Skorupsky or Yurii Skorupskyi (Ukrainian: Юрій Олександрович Скорупський; born 13 May 1965) is a Ukrainian-American painter, monumentalist. The husband of Erika Komonyi.

Honorary member of the National Union of Artists of Ukraine (2002), the National Union of Artists of America, the Chicago Artists' Coalition (1994), and the Association of Oil and Acrylic Painters (2000). Founder and president of the Society of Artists "Dolia" (1987, Rava-Ruska; 1991, Chicago).

== Biography ==
Yuri Skorupsky was born on 13 May 1965, in Rava-Ruska, now Lviv Oblast of Ukraine.

In 1984, he graduated from the Yaniv Art School; in 1987, from the Moscow State Institute of Culture; in 1991, from the Lviv State Institute of Decorative and Applied Arts (teachers: Mykhailo Tkachenko, Petro Kravchenko, Yurii Skandakov). In 1989, while studying at the above-mentioned university, he and the art group "Dolia" exchanged experience at the University of Wisconsin–Madison (USA).

In 1991, he emigrated to the U.S., where he still lives and works in Chicago. He provides financial and creative support to Ukrainian artists.

== Creativity ==
From the late 1980s, he participated in more than 70 collective and 20 solo exhibitions held in Ukraine, Europe and the U.S. Separate international exhibitions in Chicago, New York City (2003, in particular at Art Expo New York), Los Angeles, San Francisco (2002), Salon d'Automne in Paris. He paints landscapes in the style of impressionism.

Among the main works:

- painting "Field of Flowers" (2003), "Winter. Frozen River" (2004), "Rhapsody of a Warm Evening. Water Lilies" (2005, a gift for the National Museum in Lviv on the occasion of the 100th anniversary of its foundation), "Mountains in Winter" (2008), "Morning" (2008), "Red Cardinal in the Kingdom of the Tree", "Flowers in a Vase" (2007), "Field of Golden Wheat, Summer Day" (2008), "Winter in Colorado", "Snowy Winter", "Winter in Ukraine", "Thaw", "Winter Landscape", "Loneliness", "Winter in an Old Village in Ukraine", "Poppy Fields";
- painted the Church of the Immaculate Conception of the Holy Virgin Mary of the UGCC (Palos Park, USA);
- restored frescoes in the chancel and some wooden carved church utensils for worship, created the scenes "Christ in the Garden of Gethsemane" and "The Resurrection of the Daughters of Joel" for the Holy Trinity Orthodox Cathedral in Chicago.

Some of his works are kept in the collections of the Ukrainian National Museum and the Ukrainian Institute of Modern Art in Chicago, the National Art Museum of Ukraine in Kyiv, the Andrei Sheptytskyi National Museum in Lviv, the Borys Voznytskyi National Art Gallery in Lviv, the Museum of Fine Arts in Rava-Ruska; in private collections of George W. Bush, as well as in Ukraine, Estonia, Poland, the Czech Republic, Germany, Canada, the United Kingdom, and the United States. The artist's work has been published in the publications "Obrazotvorche Mystetstvo", "American Art Review" and "Southwest Art".

== Awards ==
- the title "Master – Golden Hands" for his works in artistic wood carving and painting;
- the artist's name is listed in the Encyclopedic Directory of Outstanding Professionals of the United States, the national American directory "Who is Who".

== Gallery ==
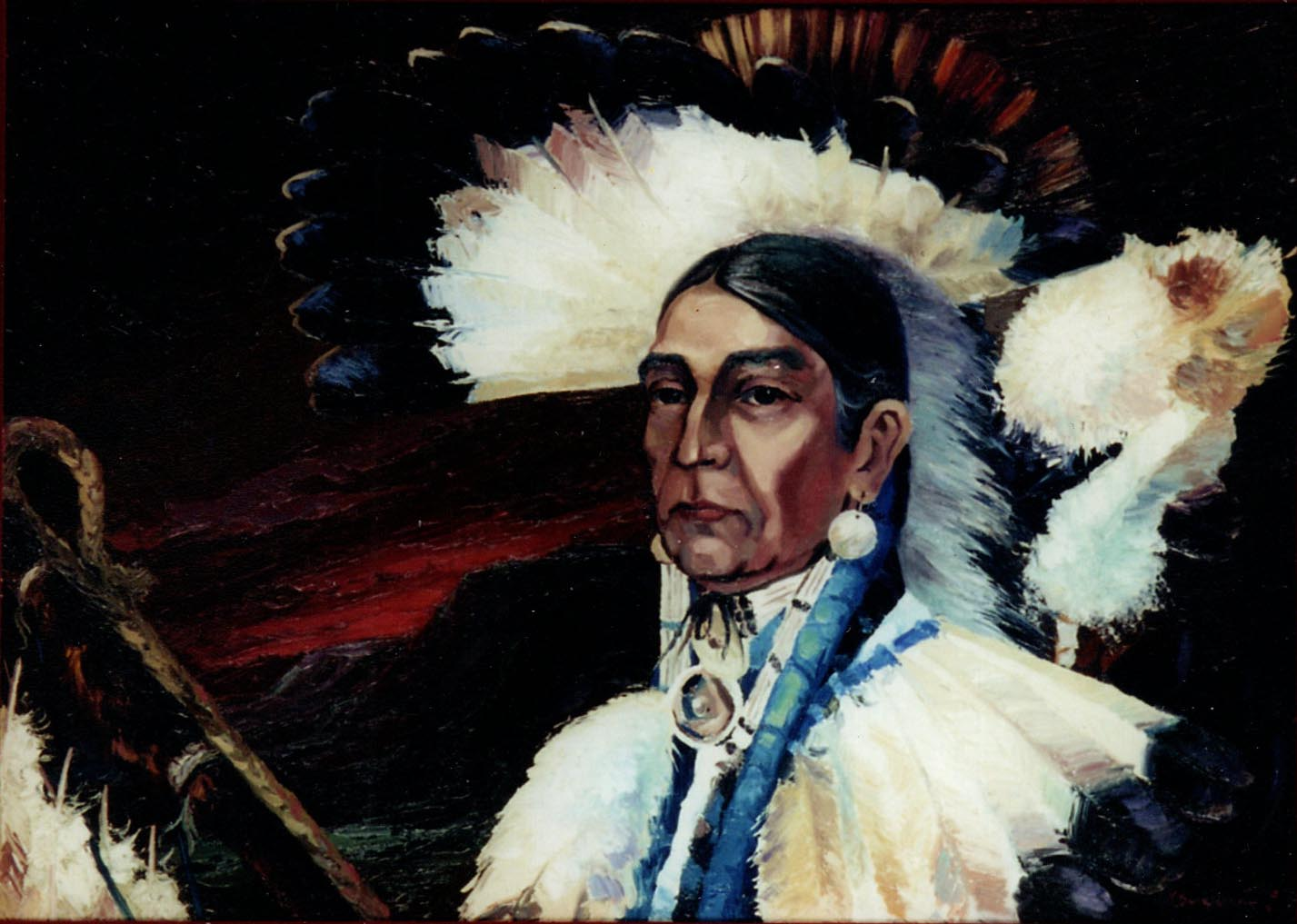

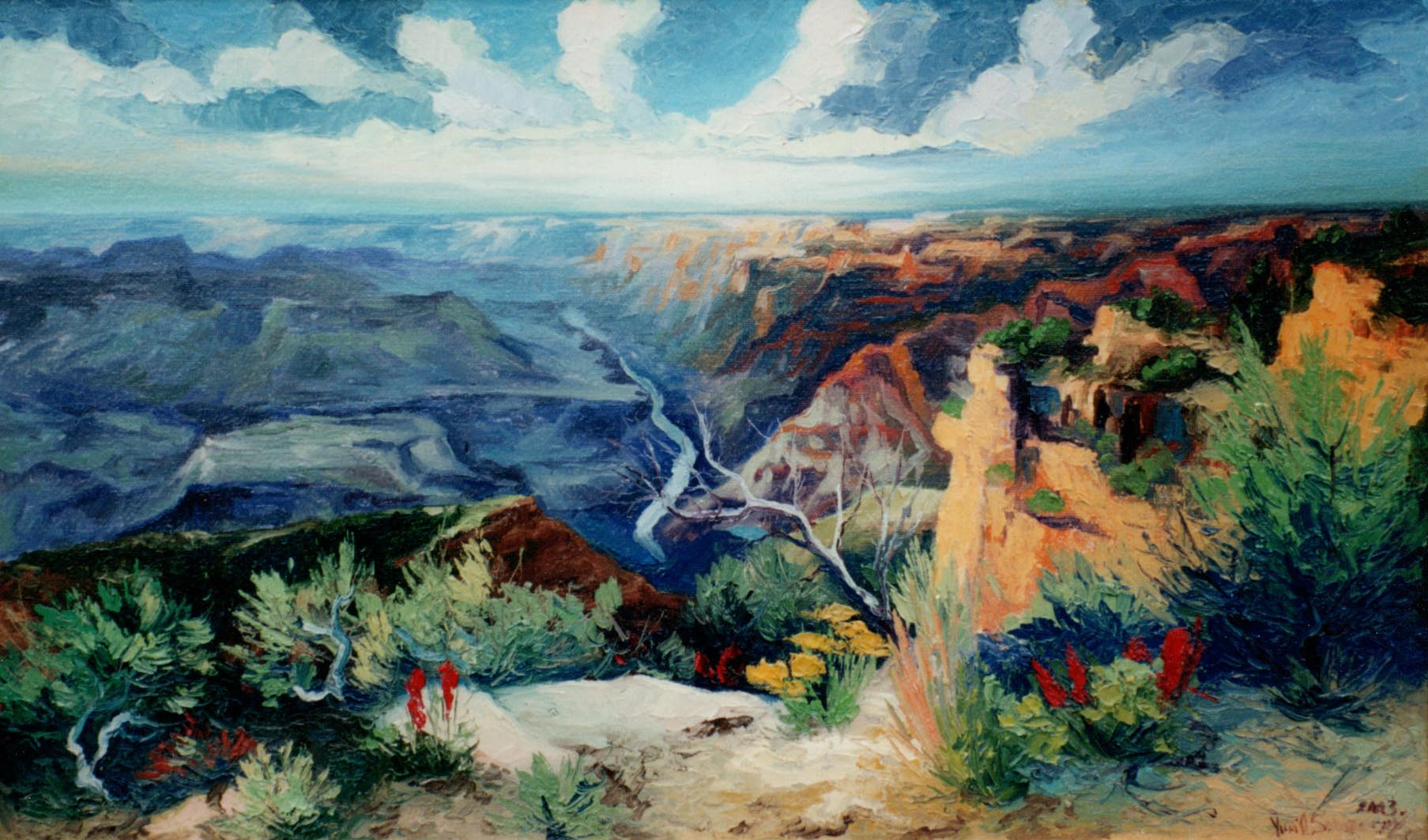

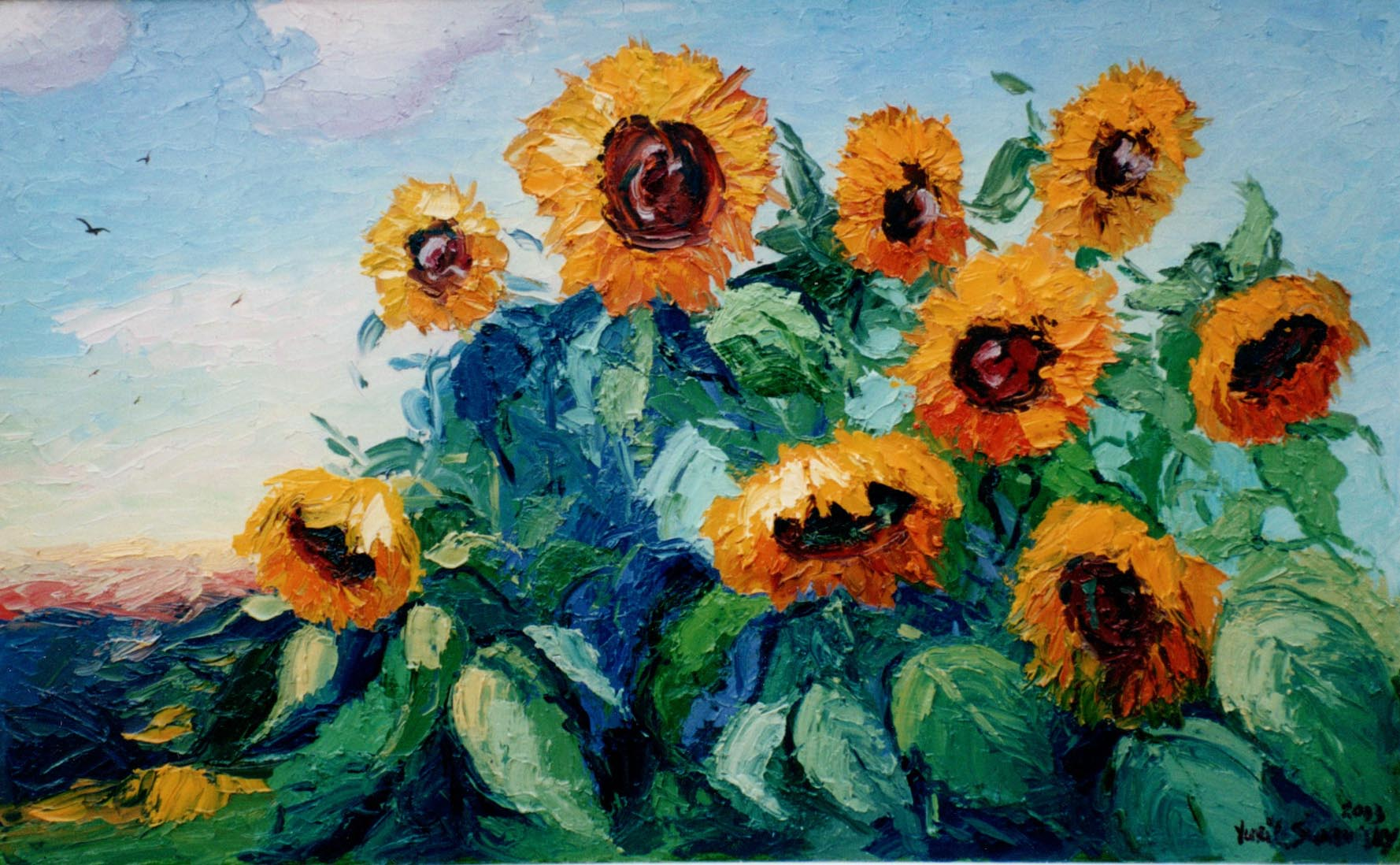

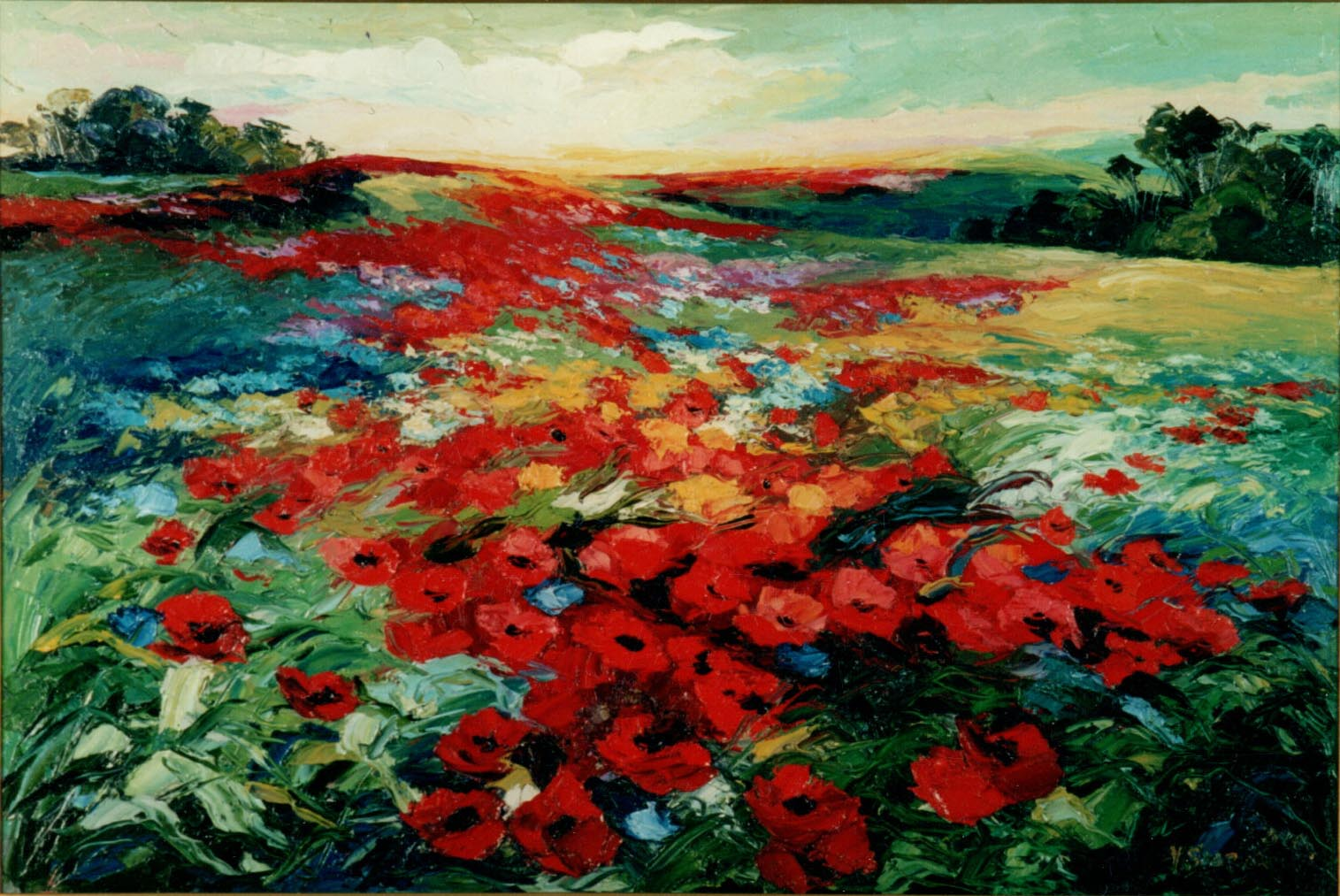

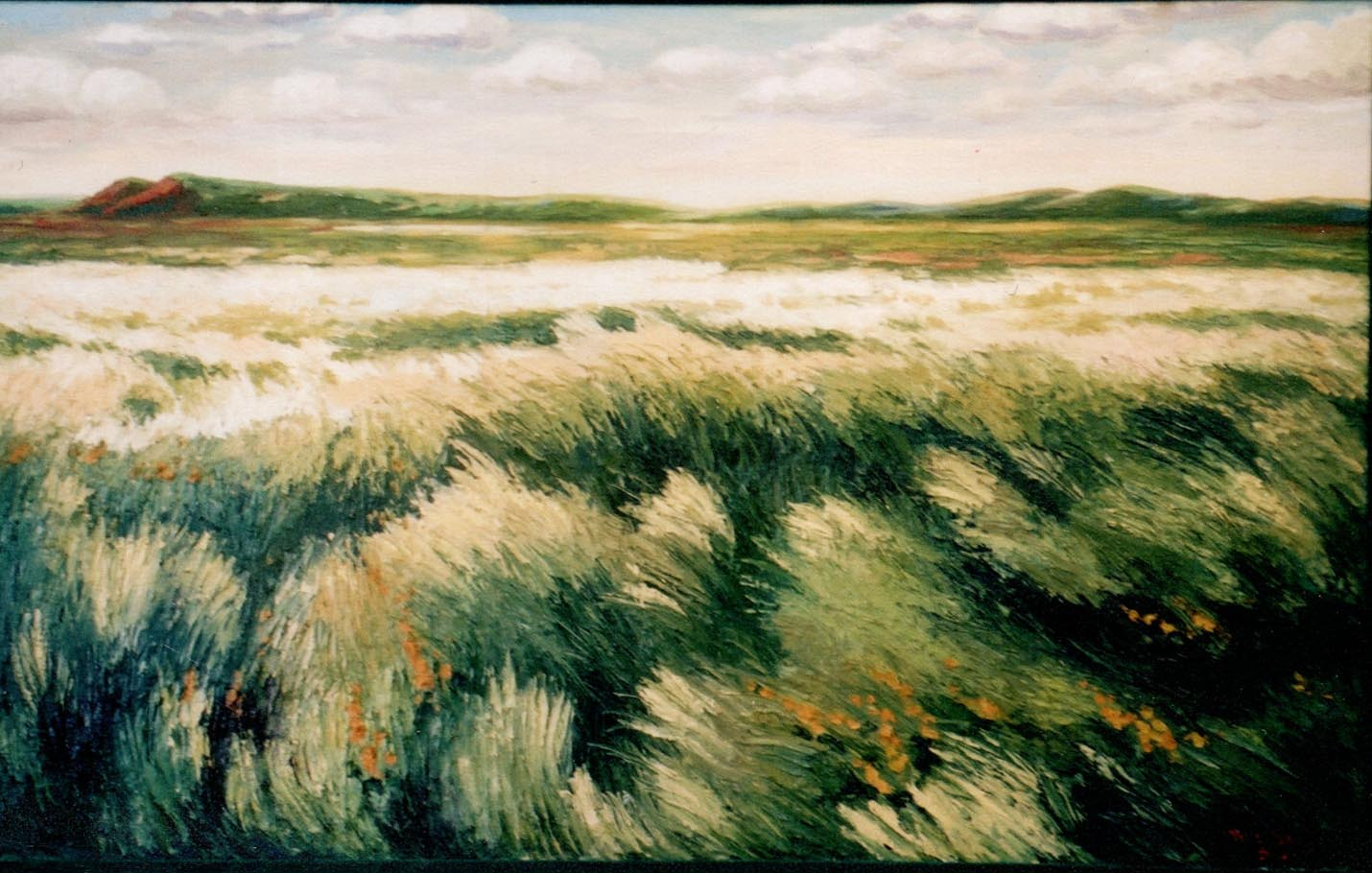

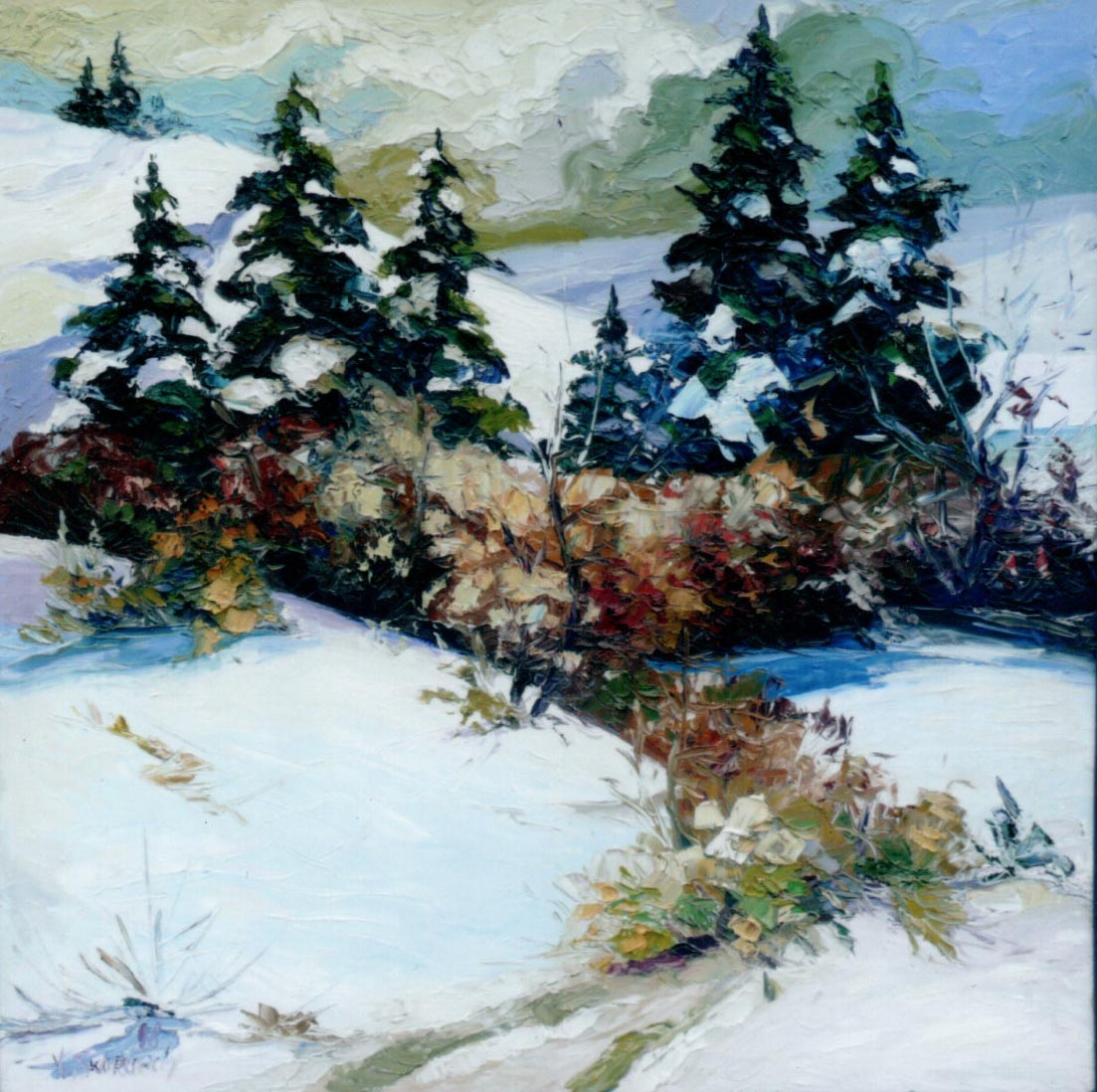

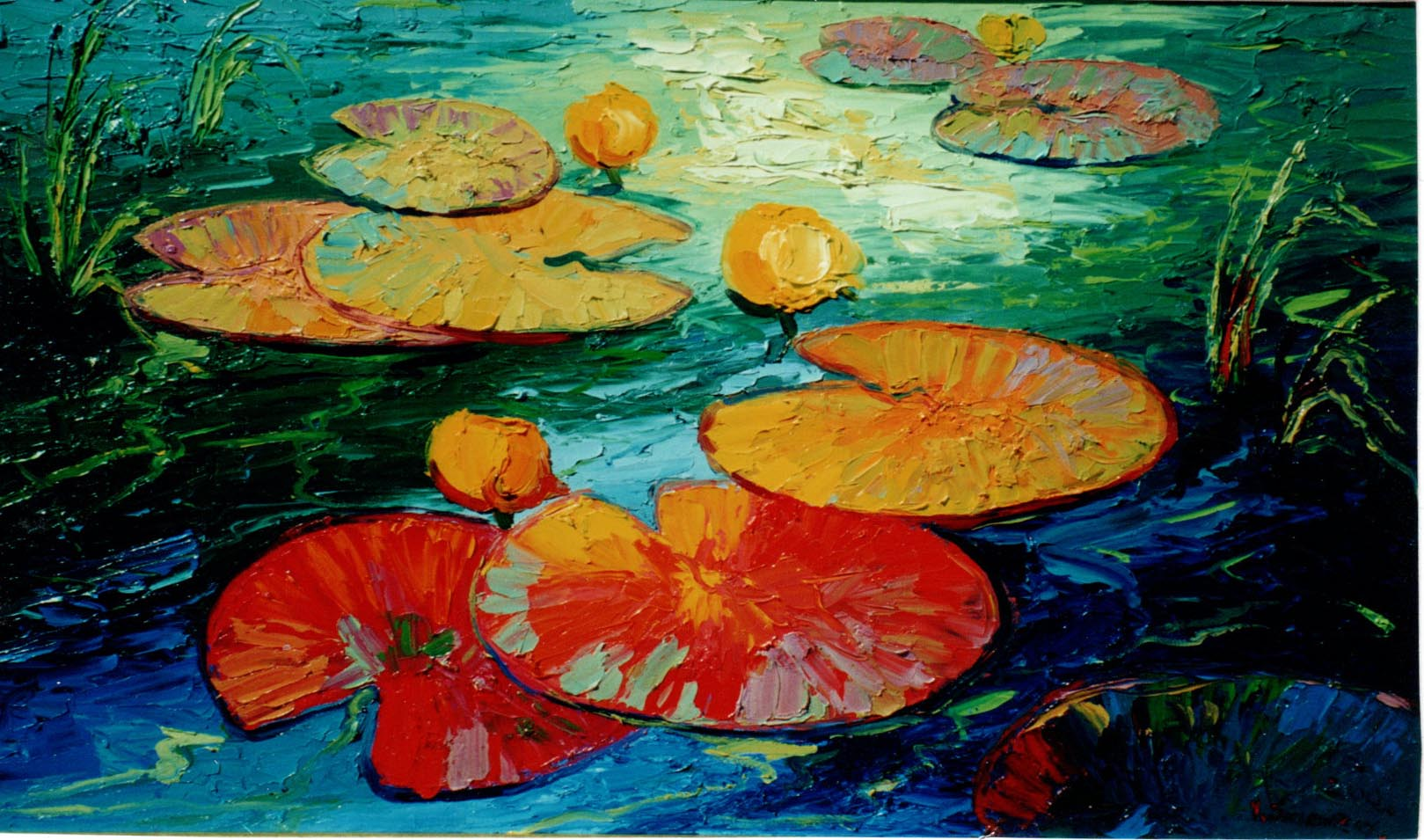

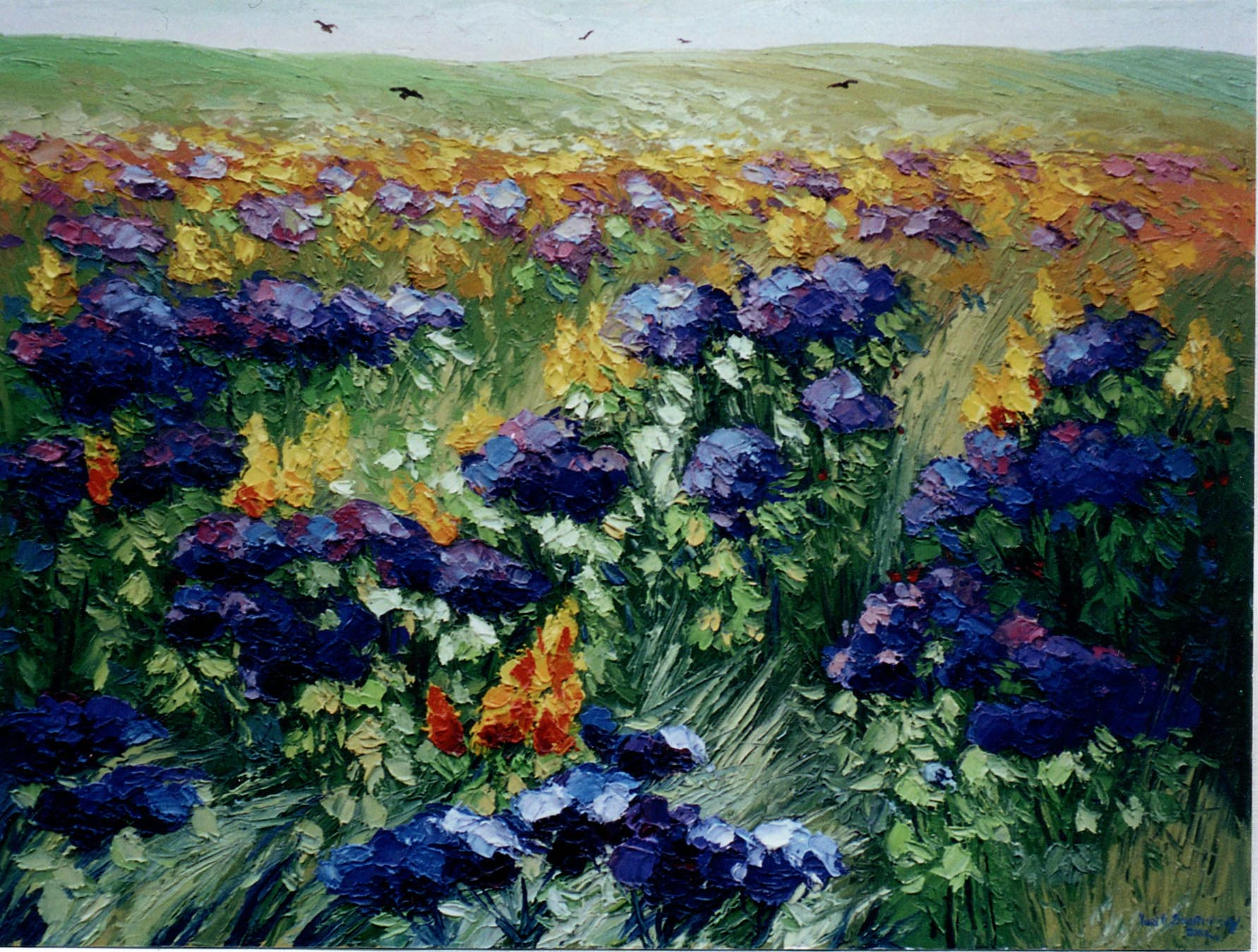

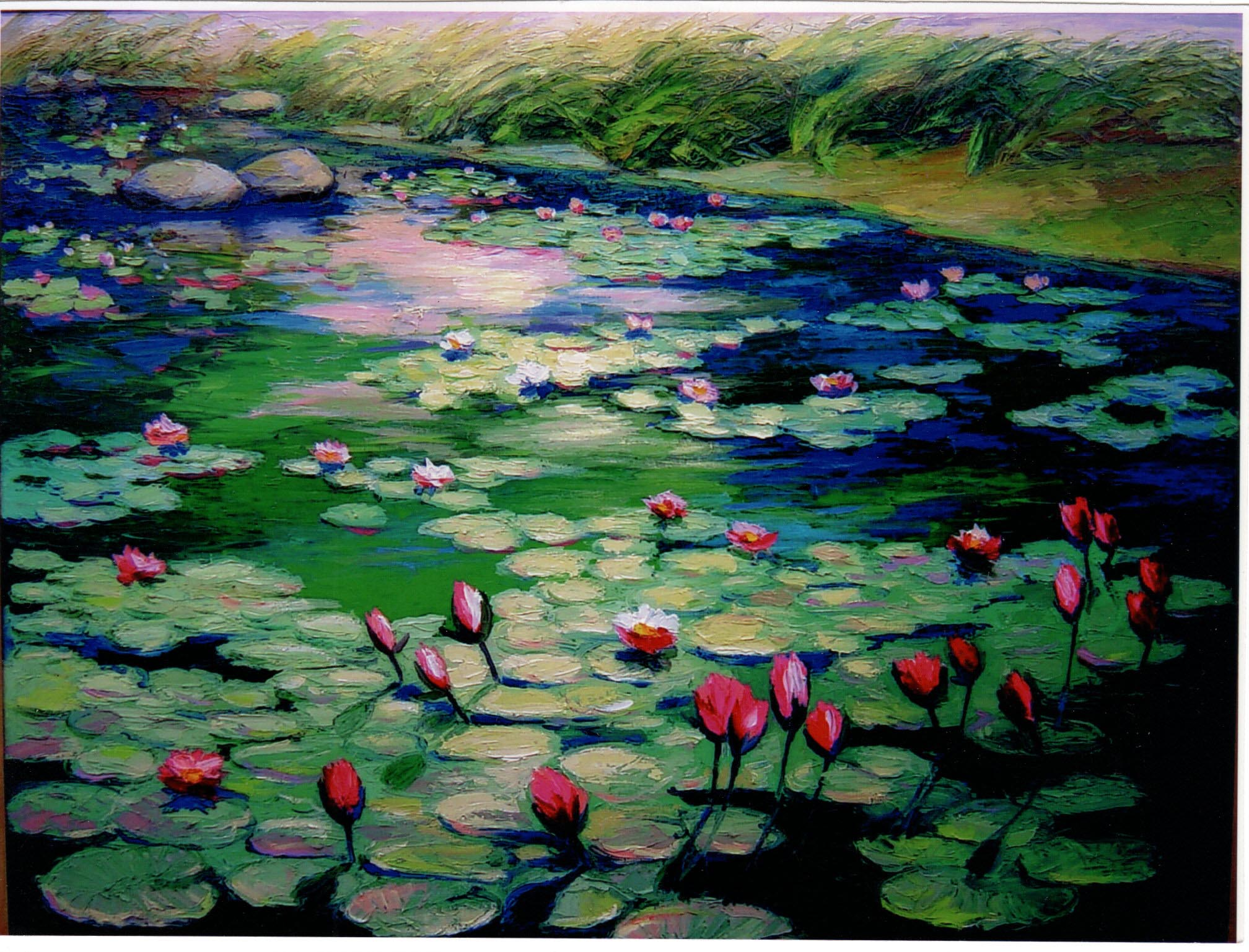

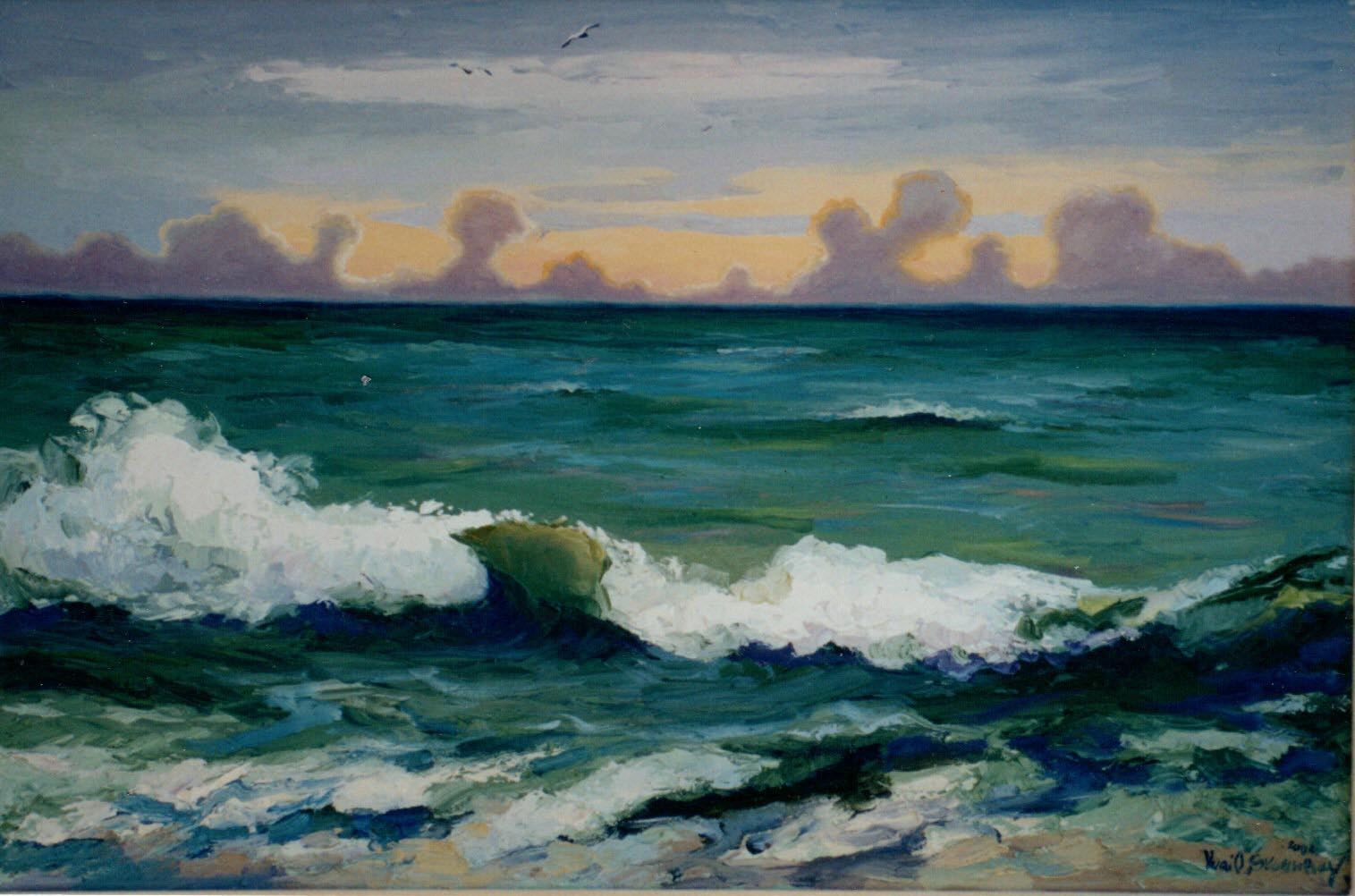

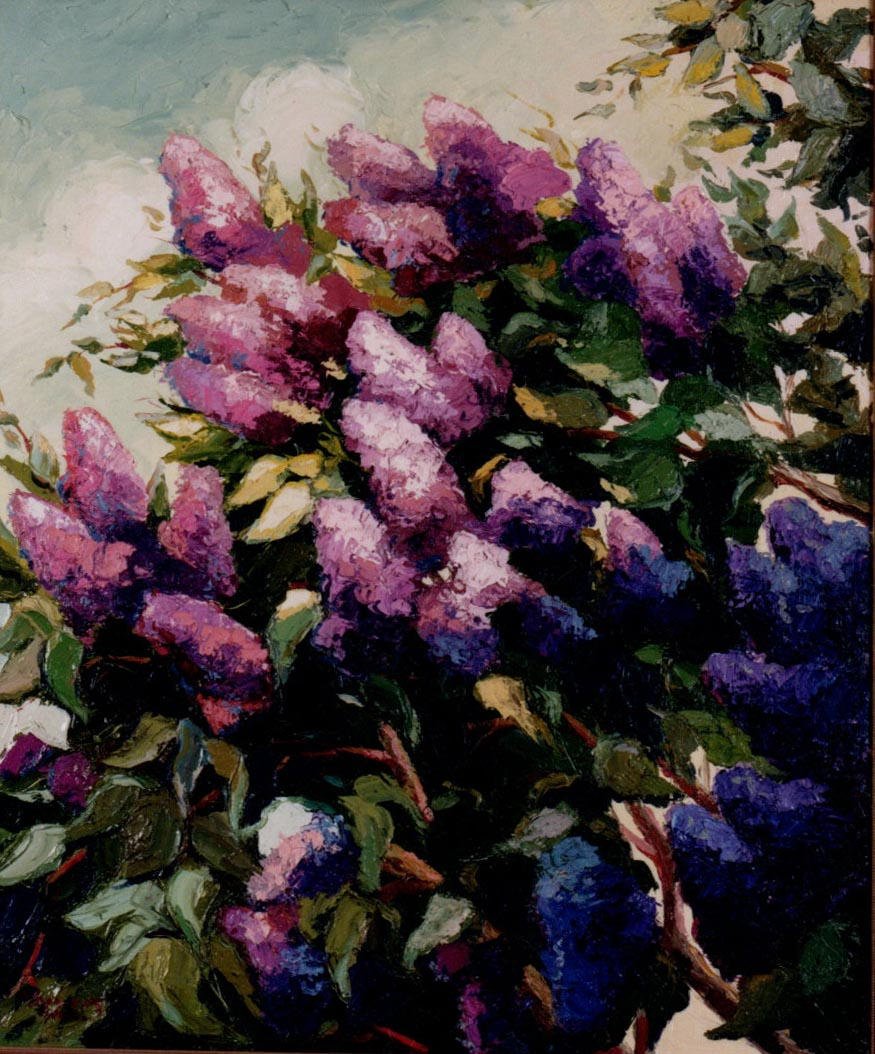

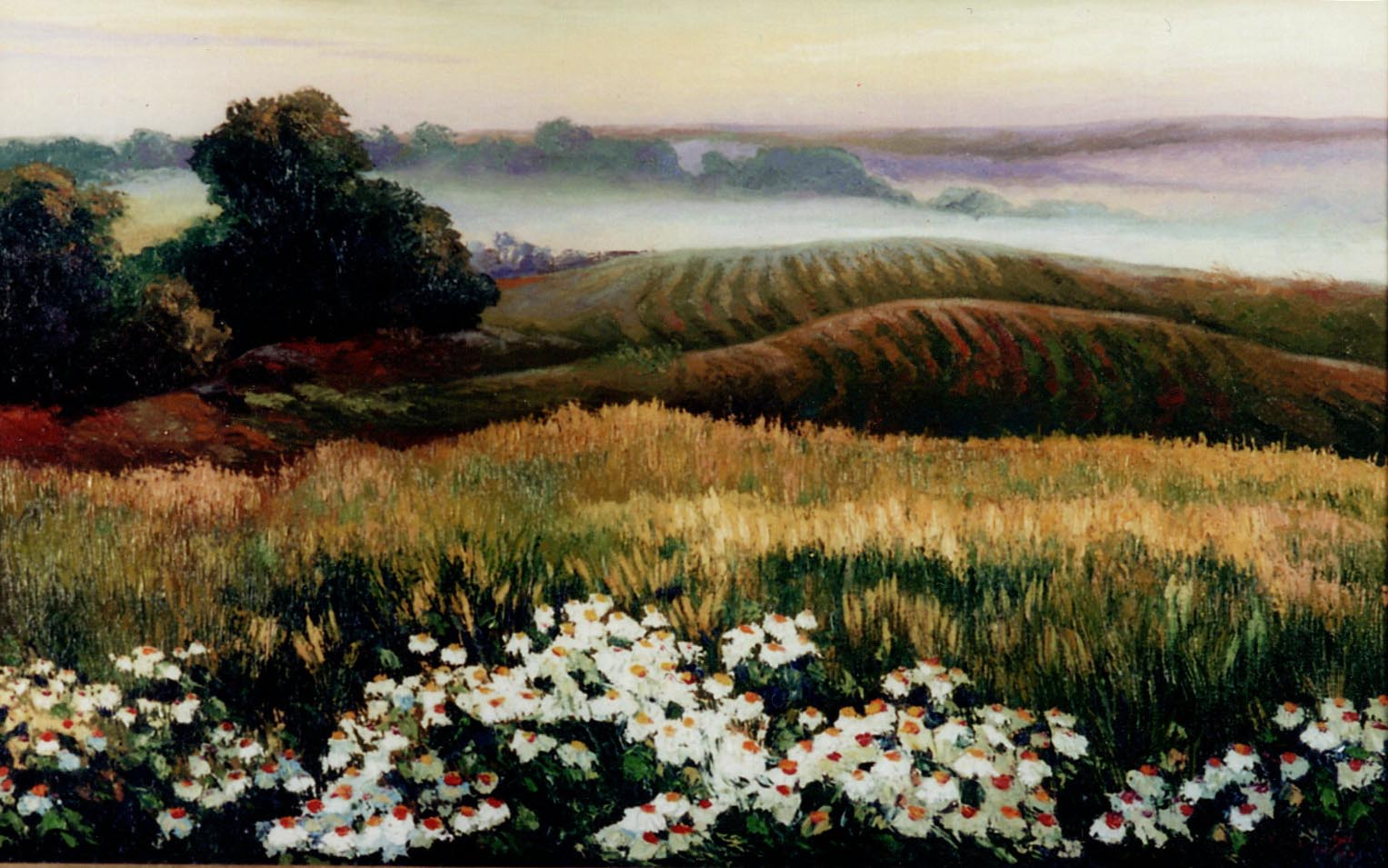

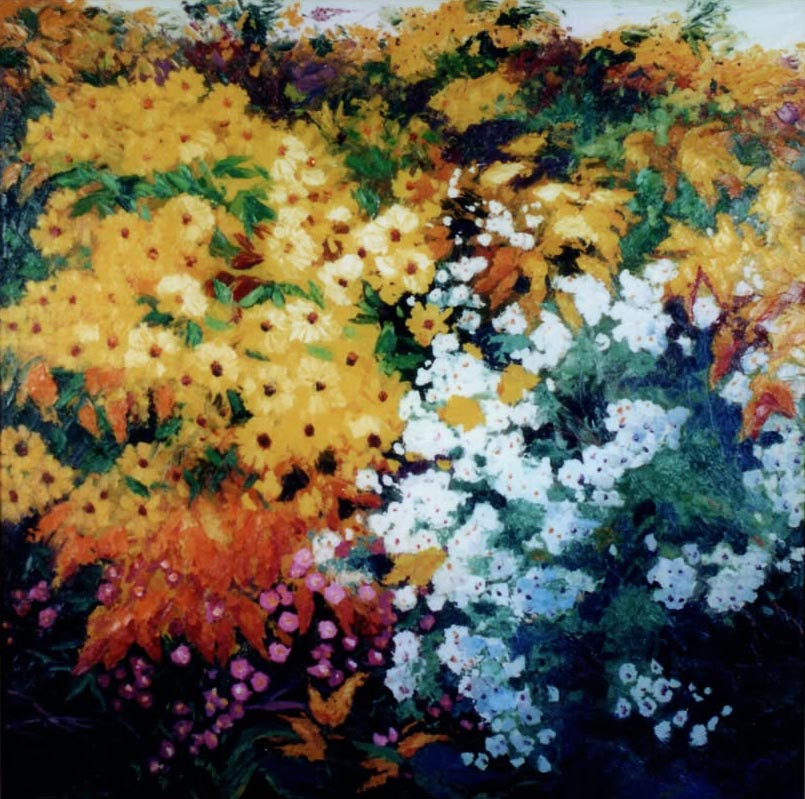

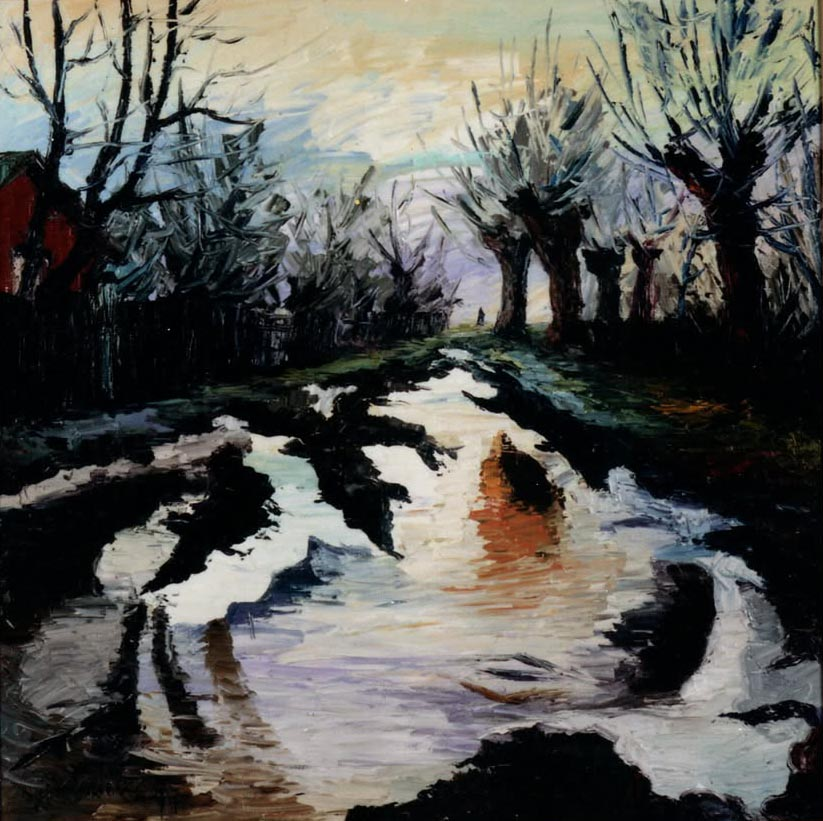

== Bibliography ==
- Г. Г. Стельмащук. Скорупський Юрій // Українські митці у світі. Матеріали до історії українського мистецтва XX ст.. — Львівська національна академія мистецтв (Науково-дослідний сектор). — Львів : Апріорі, 2013. — С. 440—442. — ISBN 978-617-629-152-7.
- Юрій Скорупський // Художники України. Випуск 2 / К.: ІПРЕЗ, 2001. — С. 187.
- Skorupsky, Yuri Oleksandrovych // America's Registry of Outstanding Professionals. — 2004. — С. 765. — ISBN 0-9719527-2-8.
- Залізняк Б. Художник, який робить нас щасливими // За вільну Україну+. — 2008. — 18 квіт.
- Романишин М. Юрій Скорупський: мистецтво — його доля // Образотворче мистецтво. — К., 2008. — 3. — С. 123.
- Стельмащук Г. Сюрпризи долі Юрія Скорупського // Дзвін. — 2021. — № 5. — С. 222—225.
- Кравець М. Життя у пейзажі // Вісник ХДАДМ. — No. 7. — 2010.
- Юрій Скорупський — художник, який робить нас щасливими // Універсум. — 2008. — No. 5–6 (175–176).

=== Individual publications ===
- Detroit Biegas Gallery; Show Catalog, 3 November to 13 December 1996
- Dolya Ukrainian Association of Artists, Western American Tour, Chicago, Show Catalog, 1993
- Middfest International Magazine, Middletown, Ohio, Show Catalog, 1993
- Fate/Dolya Arts Exhibition Minneapolis, Madison, Chicago, Show Catalog, 1991–1992
- Yuri Skorupsky // Art Exhibition: Orizzonti: Ukraine Contemporary Art / Khrystyna Berehovska. — Lviv : Apriori, 2023. — С. 98—99.
