= Erika Komonyi =

Ukrainian-American painter, ceramist, and designer (born 1965)

- Еріка-Марта Федорівна Комоні
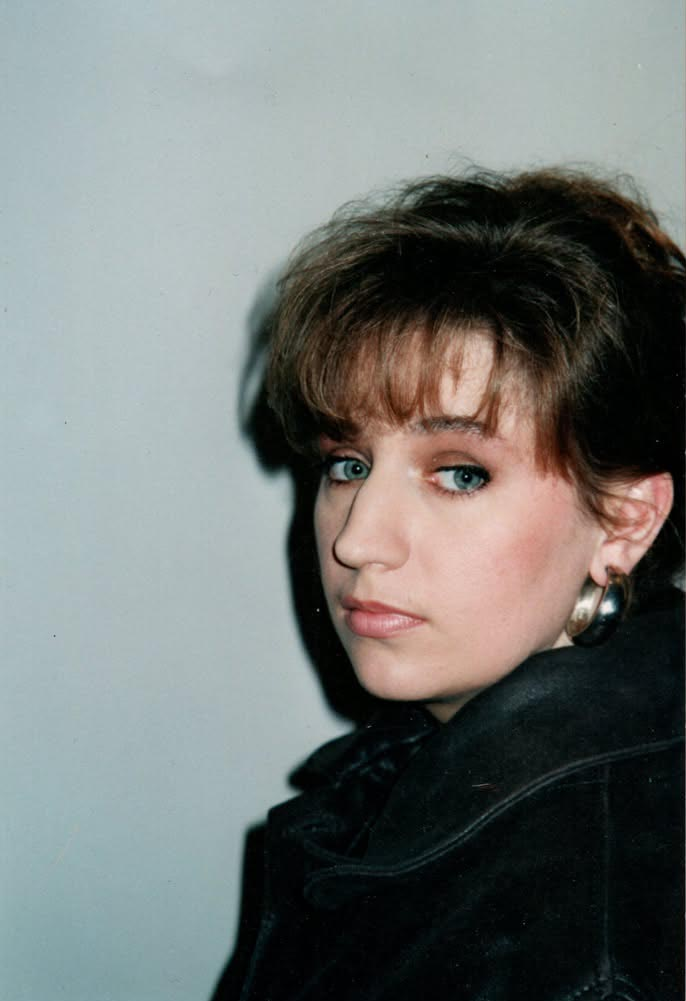
- Born: 13 November 1965 (age 60); Kholmok, now Zakarpattia Oblast, Ukraine
- Education: Uzhhorod College of Applied Arts, Lviv Institute of Applied and Decorative Arts
- Occupations: Painter, ceramist, designer

Erika Komonyi (Ukrainian: Еріка-Марта Федорівна Комоні; born 10 November 1965) is a Ukrainian-American painter, ceramist, and designer of Hungarian descent; member of the Ukrainian Artists' Society "Dolia" and the American Art Coalition.

== Biography ==
Born on 10 November 1965 in the Kholmok, Uzhhorod Raion, Zakarpattia Oblast (now Ukraine). In 1985, she graduated from the Uzhhorod Art School; the ceramics department of the Uzhhorod College of Applied Arts; and in 1991, the Lviv Institute of Applied and Decorative Arts, where she studied under Oleksandr Voloshenko, Bohdan Korzh, and Ivan Mykytiuk. She honed her skills in creating black-glazed smoked ceramics under István Fozekos (Hungary) and Ukrainian masters from the village of Havarechchyna in the Lviv Oblast.

In 1991, she and her husband Yuri Skorupsky emigrated to the United States, settling in Chicago. From 1992, she worked as an artist and designer for Yolanda Lorente's company in Chicago for 25 years.

== Creativity ==
She works in the fields of painting, graphic art, and artistic ceramics. She designs fabrics and clothing (in particular, she created dresses for Michael Jackson's mother Katherine, Lithuanian First Lady Alma Adamkienė, and a Chicago Opera singer). She has participated in group and solo exhibitions.

Among his works:

- ceramic vases (1990);
- graphics: "City" (1991), "Lovers" (1992, cardboard, acrylic), "Spirit of the Evening City", "City", "Guardian Angel" (all 1993), "Love" (1994).

Some of the artist's works are exhibited at the Ukrainian National Museum in Chicago, the Transcarpathian Art Museum in Uzhhorod, and in private collections.

== Bibliography ==
- Г. Стельмащук. Художня кераміка Еріки Комоні // Дзвін. — 2021. — No. 11. — P. 229—232.
- Комоні Еріка-Марта Федорівна // Каталог. — 1990. — Вип. 3—4. — P. 133—134.

=== Individual publications ===
- Г. Стельмащук. Еріка Комоні. Творчий портрет мисткині. — Львів : Колір Про, 2023. — 250 pp.
- Erika Komonyi // Art Exhibition: Orizzonti: Ukraine Contemporary Art / Khrystyna Berehovska. — Lviv : Apriori, 2023. — С. 100—101.
