= Potelych =

Potelych Потелич
- Village
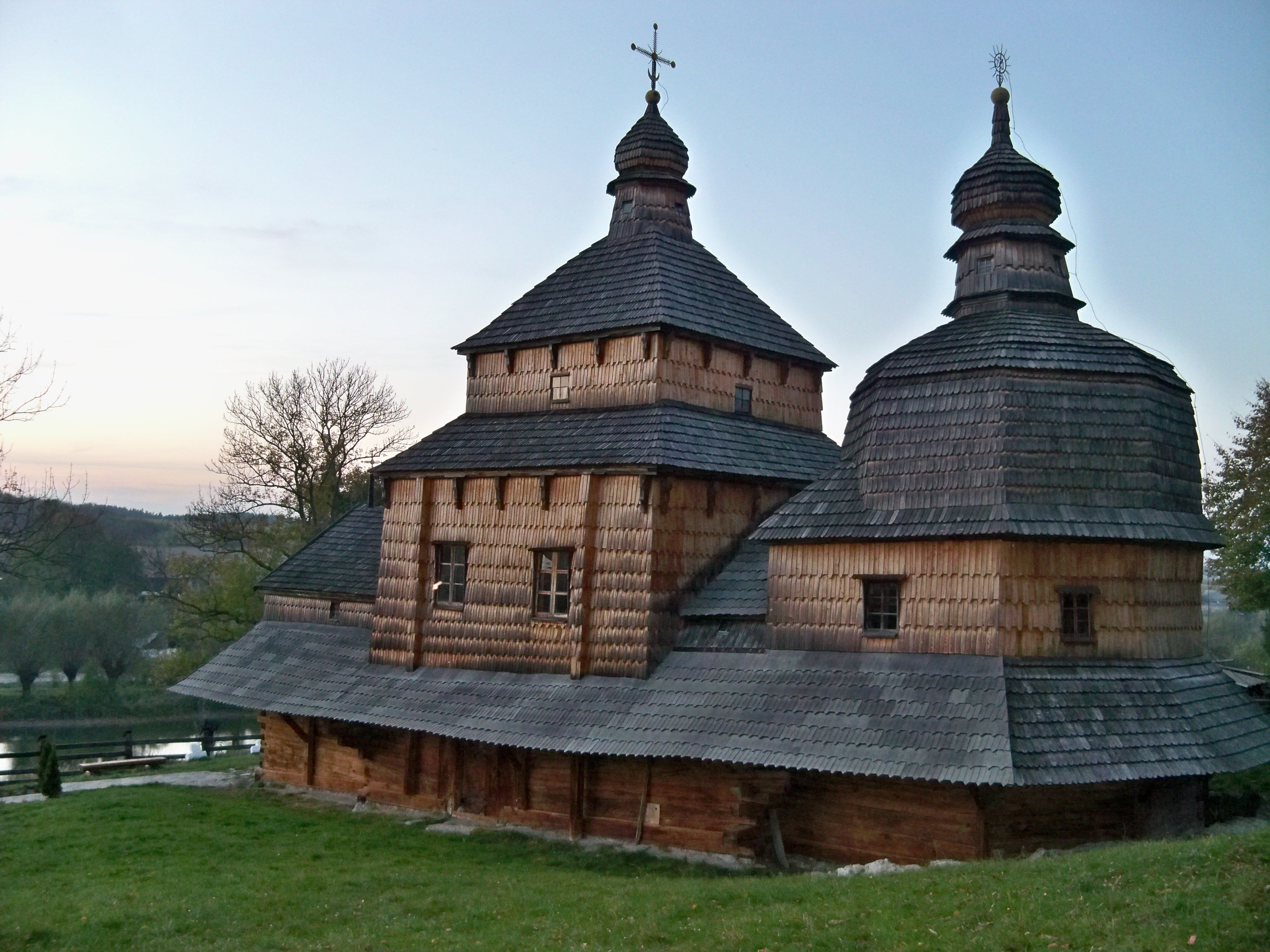
- Descent of the Holy Spirit Church in Potelych

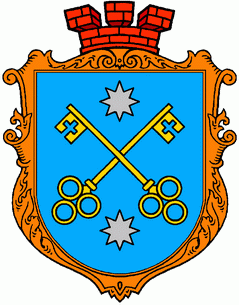
- Coat of arms

- Location in Lviv Oblast Location in Ukraine
- Coordinates: 50°12′40″N 23°32′59″E
- Country: Ukraine
- Oblast: Lviv Oblast
- Raion: Lviv Raion
- Hromada: Rava-Ruska urban hromada
- First mentioned: 1262
- Magdeburg rights: 1498

Area
  - Total: 30.7 km^{2} (11.9 sq mi)
- Elevation: 258 m (846 ft)

Population (2001)
  - Total: 815
  - Density: 26.5/km^{2} (68.8/sq mi)
- Postal code: 80320
- Area code: +380 3252

Potelych (Ukrainian: Потелич) is a Ukrainian village in Lviv Raion (district) of Lviv Oblast (province). It belongs to Rava-Ruska urban hromada, one of the hromadas of Ukraine. It is located 6 km (8 mi) southwest of Rava-Ruska city and 70 km (43 mi) northwest of Lviv. Potelych has an area of 30 square kilometres (11 sq mi) and an elevation of 258 metres (846 ft). According to the 2001 census, the village has a population of 815 inhabitants.

== History ==
Potelych is an old settlement, located near the modern Ukrainian-Polish border. The first mention of the village is from 1262. Previously, the village was a small town called Telych (Ukrainian: Телич). In 1498, the town was granted Magdeburg rights. It was a big economic center on the trade route between Lublin and Lviv. In the 17th century, it fell into disrepair due to relocation of trade route northerly to Rava-Ruska.

In the village is located Descent of the Holy Spirit Church, the oldest wooden church in Lviv Oblast, built in 1502. In 2013 church was added to the UNESCO World Heritage List among 16 wooden churchs of Carpathian Region in Poland and Ukraine.

Also in Potelych is located one of the largest German military cemeteries of victims of the Second World War in Ukraine. As of July 2024, there are 18,000 burials.

== Notable people ==
- Cassian Sakowicz (1578–1647), Polish-Ruthenian (Ukrainian) Orthodox activist and, later, a Catholic theologian, writer and polemicist.
- David HaLevi Segal (1586–1667), one of the greatest Polish rabbinical authorities.
- Lavrentiy Zyzaniy (c.1560–c.1634), Ukrainian philologist and theologian.
