= Lavrentij Zizanij =

Ukrainian philologist (~1596)

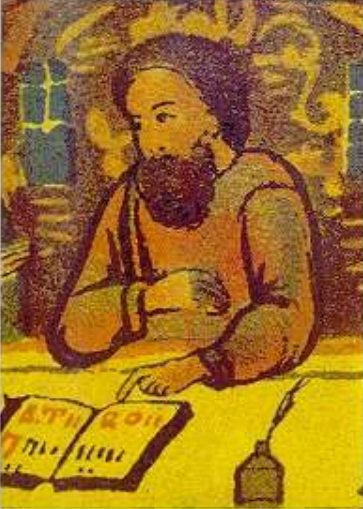
Lavrentiy Zyzaniy

Hrammatyka slovenska (1596). Click for full PDF.

Lavrentiy Zyzaniy-Tustanovsky (Ukrainian: Лаврентій Зизаній-Тустановський, real surname Kukil (Кукіль); 1550-1560s, Potelych, Galicia – c. 1634 Korets, Volhynia) was a Ukrainian philologist, Orthodox theologian and protoiereus, best known as the author of Slavonic Grammar (Hrammatyka slovenska), which was published in 1596.

== Biography ==
Zyzaniy was born Lavrentiy Kukil in Potelych near Zhovkva, Galicia, and likely came from a burgher family. His brother Stepan (Stefan) was a church writer and theologian, who in 1586 started teaching at the Brotherhood School in Lviv and later became its rector. After moving to Vilno in 1593 he served as a didascal and gave sermons opposing Roman Catholicism and the Union of Brest, which led to his eventual excommunication by metropolitan Michael Rohoza. Stepan authored a number of polemic works and published a catechism, which was criticized by both Catholics and Orthodox clergymen for containing elements of Socinian theology.

During the 1590s Lavrentiy worked as a teacher at brotherhood schools in Lviv, Berestia and Vilno, and starting from 1597 became a private tutor at the homes of Orthodox aristocracy. In 1596 he published the Slavonic Grammar, compiled from the works by Lascaris, Crusius and Melanchthon, as well as an alphabet book with an appendix called Lexis, which became the first printed Church Slavonic-Ukrainian dictionary. In 1619 he moved to Kyiv and continued teaching, simultaneously contributing to publications by Yelysei Pletenetskyi. In 1620 Zyzaniy compiled an Orthodox catechism, printed in Moscow in 1627; however, the book contained some Catholic elements, and all of its copies were destroyed following a dispute soon thereafter. Zyzaniy's catechism would later be used by Old Believers and saw a number of new editions.

== Works ==
- Slavonic Grammar (Грамматика словенска, 1596) - republished by Ivan Sakharov (1848) and Mykhailo Vozniak.
- Science for Reading and Understanding of Slavonic Language Writing (Наука ку читаню и розумЂню писма словенскаго языка..., 1596) - alphabet book.
- Lexis (Лексис сирЂчъ реченія въкратцЂ събраны и из словенскаго языка на простый рускій діялектъ истолкованы, 1596).
- Catechism (1627).
