= Rava-Ruska urban hromada =

Hromada in Lviv Oblast, Ukraine

Rava-Ruska urban hromada Рава-Руська міська громада
- Hromada
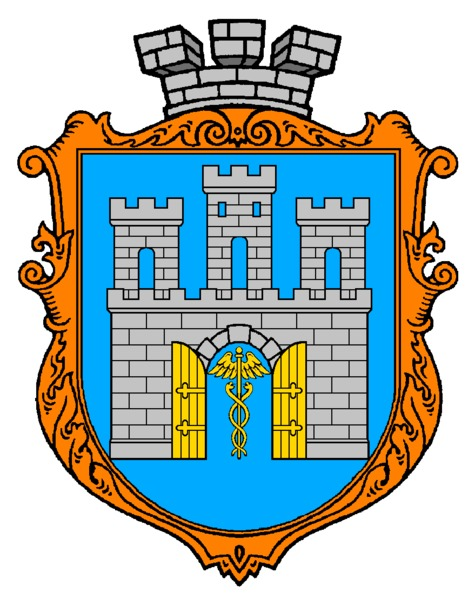
- Seal
- Interactive map of Rava-Ruska urban hromada
- Country: Ukraine
- Oblast: Lviv Oblast
- Raion: Lviv Raion
- Admin. center: Rava-Ruska

Area
  - Total: 3,181 km^{2} (1,228 sq mi)

Population (2021)
  - Total: 25,694
  - Density: 8.077/km^{2} (20.92/sq mi)
- CATOTTG code: UA46060390000035967
- Settlements: 46
- Cities: 1
- Villages: 45
- Website: rava-mr.gov.ua

Rava-Ruska urban hromada (Ukrainian: Рава-Руська міська громада) is a hromada in Ukraine, in Lviv Raion of Lviv Oblast. The administrative center is the city of Rava-Ruska.

== Settlements ==
The hromada consists of 1 city (Rava-Ruska) and 45 villages:

- Berezyna
- Borove
- Budy
- Velyki Dolyny
- Vilshanka
- Volytsia
- Hiiche
- Hirkany
- Hirky
- Holokamianka
- Horiany
- Huta Obedynska
- Deviatyr
- Dubrivka
- Dumy
- Zabiria
- Zahiria
- Zelena Huta
- Yonychi
- Kapeliukh
- Klebany
- Kovali
- Kryve
- Lypnyk
- Losyny
- Luh
- Luzhky
- Lutsyky
- Malyi
- Mali Dolyny
- Moshchana
- Nyvy
- Nova Kamianka
- Oliiarnyky
- Piltse
- Pomlyniv
- Potelych
- Ravske
- Rata
- Richky
- Synkovychi
- Sorochi Lozy
- Stare Selo
- Chornii
- Shabelnia
