= Descent of the Holy Spirit Church =

Potelych-Tserkva of the Descent of the Holy Spirit
UNESCO World Heritage Site
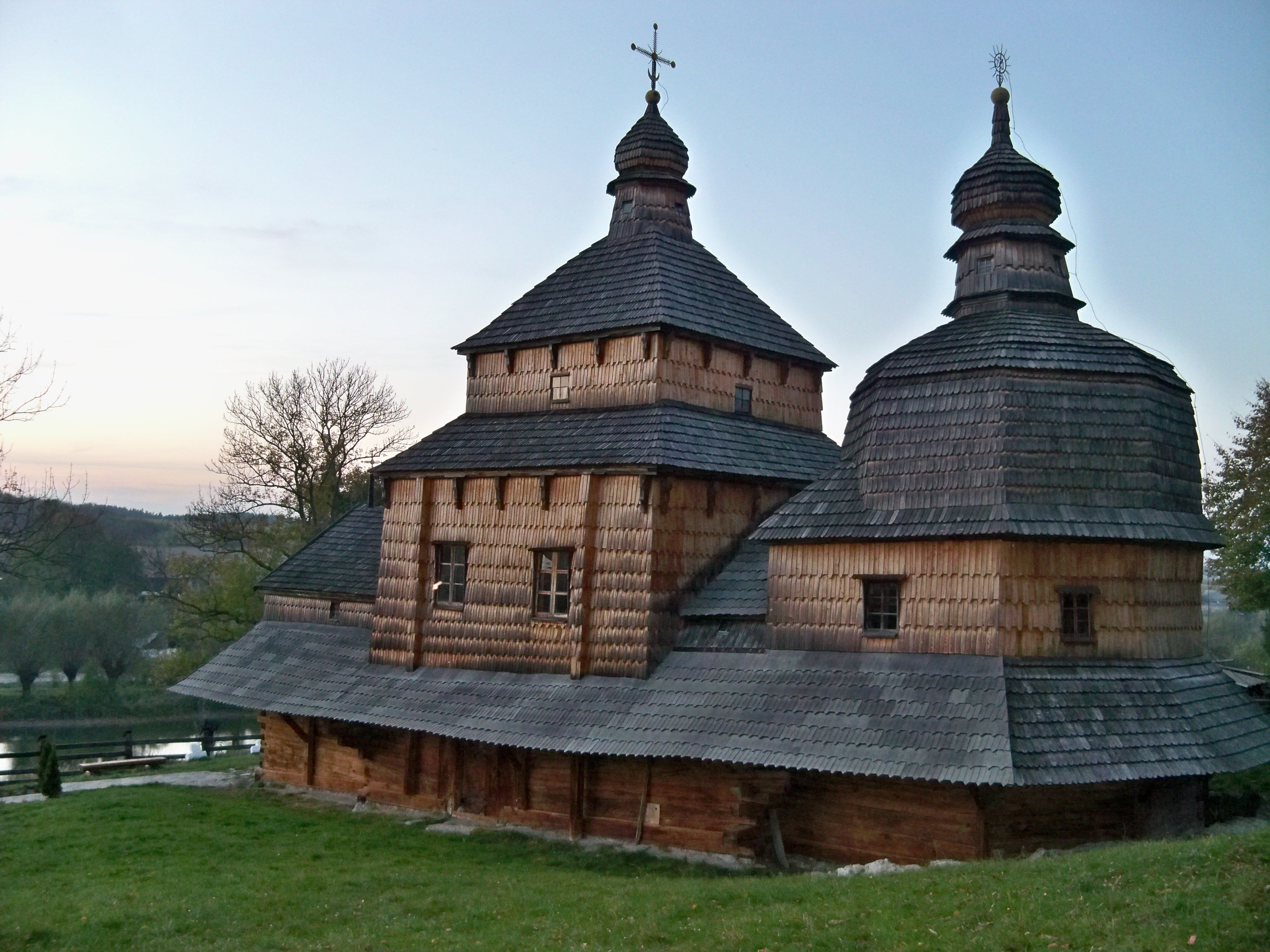

- Location within Lviv Oblast Location within Ukraine
- Location: Potelych, Lviv Raion, Lviv Oblast, Ukraine
- Part of: Wooden Tserkvas of the Carpathian Region in Poland and Ukraine
- Criteria: Cultural: (iii), (iv)
- Reference: 1424-008
- Inscription: 2013 (37th Session)
- Area: 0.19 ha (0.47 acres)
- Buffer zone: 1.1 ha (2.7 acres)
- Coordinates: 50°12′31″N 23°33′3″E

Wooden Descent of the Holy Spirit Church was built in suburb of Potelych, Ukraine in 1502 on the place of a church that was burned down by Tatars. It is the oldest wooden church in Lviv Oblast. The church was visited by Bohdan Khmelnytsky.

The structure consists of three wooden naves and a brick sacristy.

On June 21, 2013, on the 37th Session of the UNESCO World Heritage Committee in Cambodia the Holy Trinity Church was added to the UNESCO World Heritage List among 16 wooden tserkvas of Carpathian Region in Poland and Ukraine.

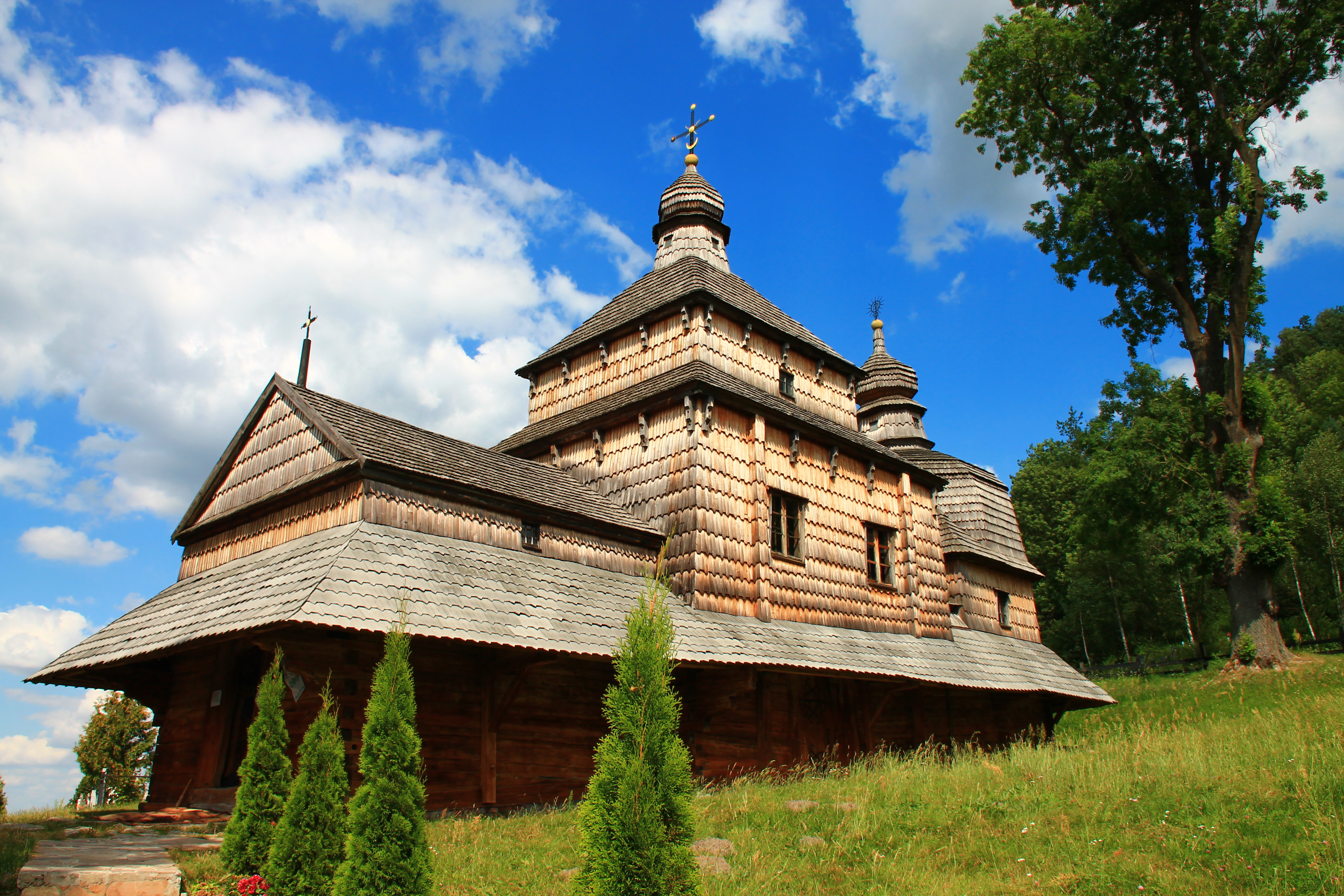

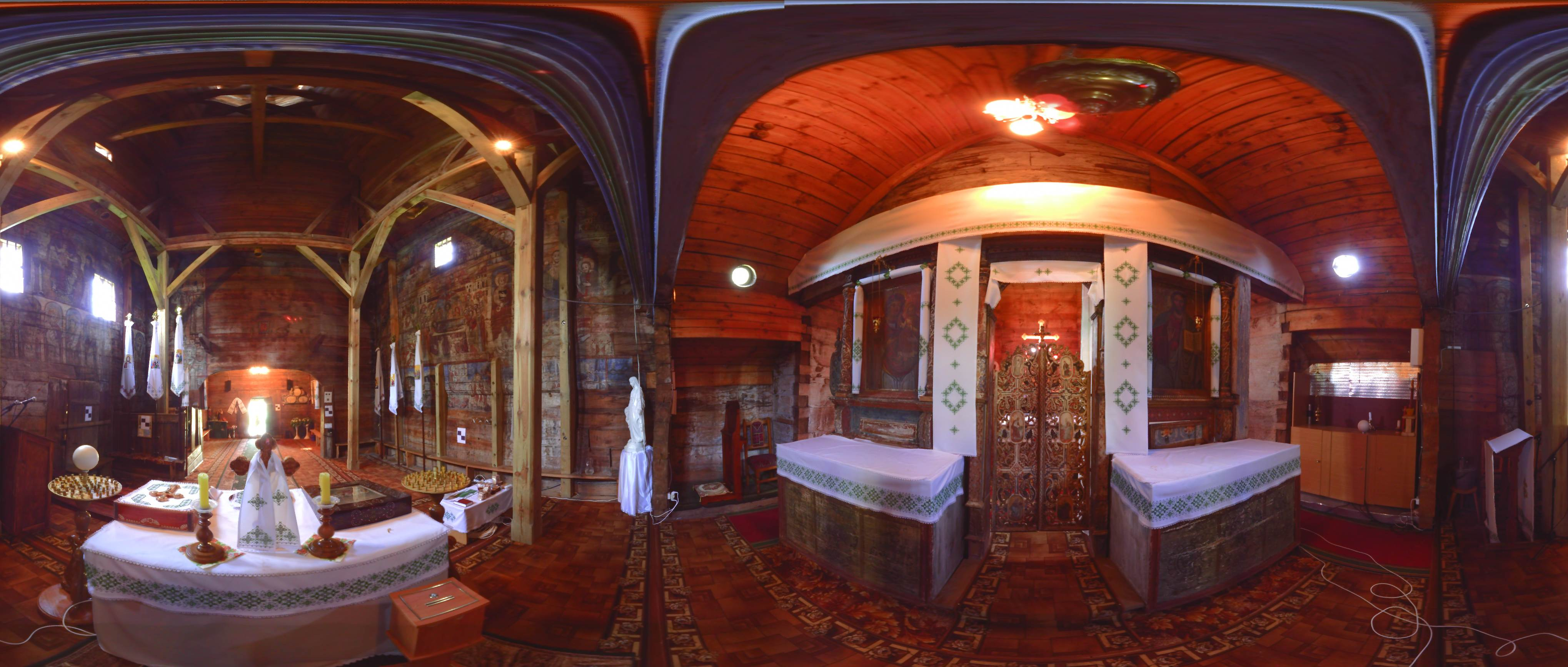
Interior

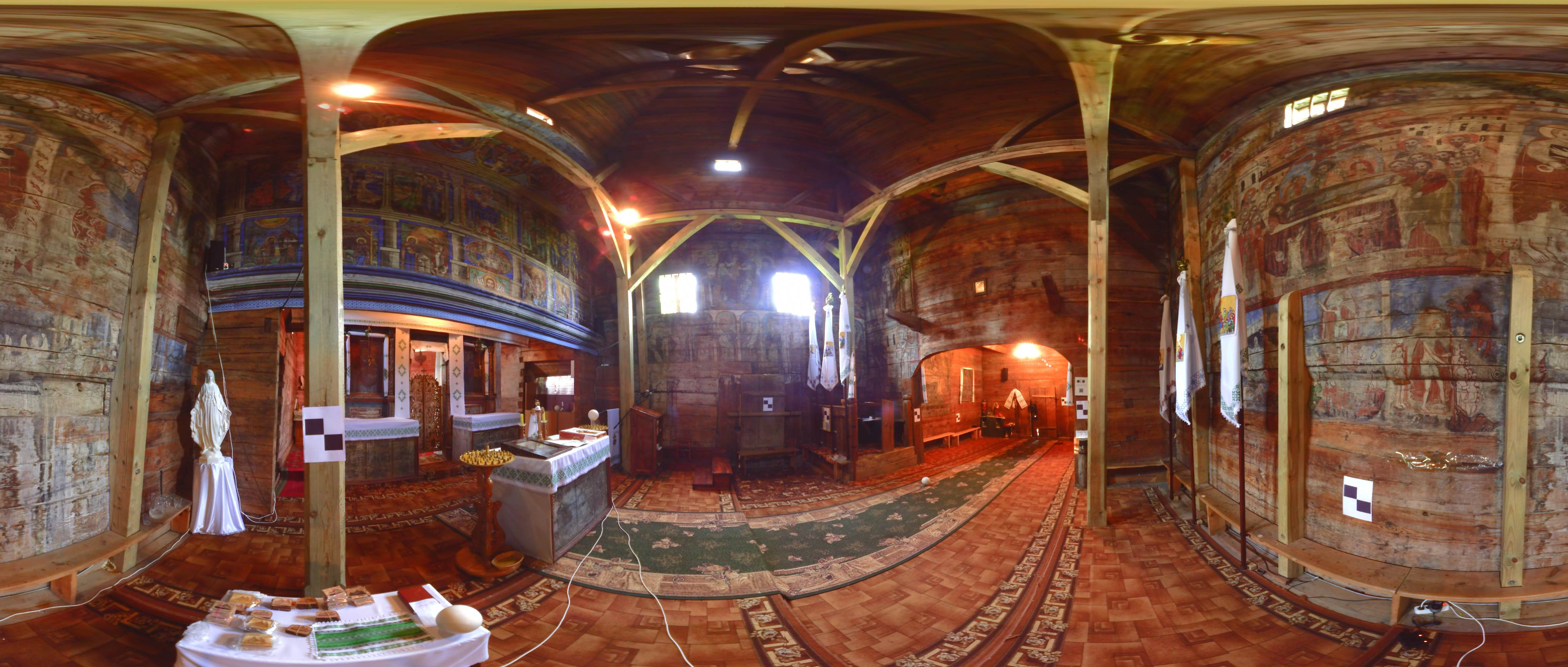
Interior

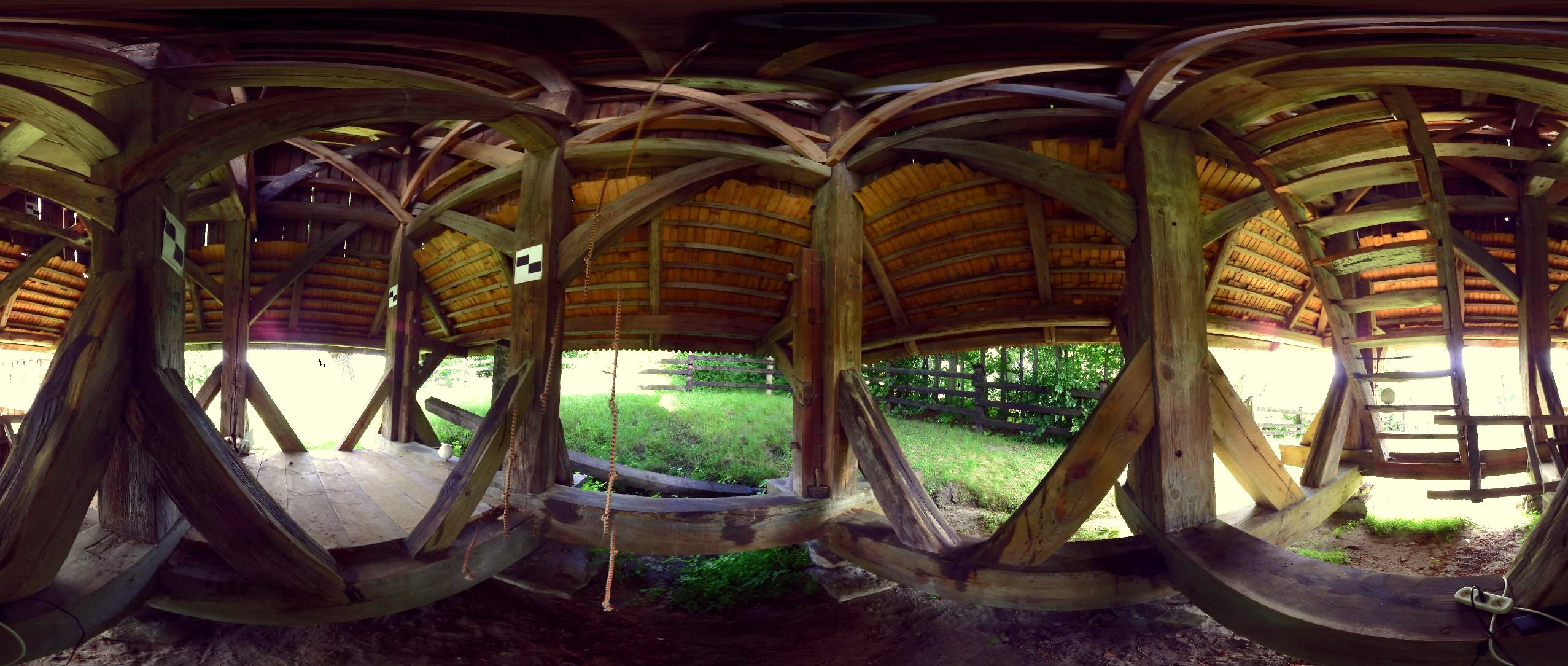
Belltower

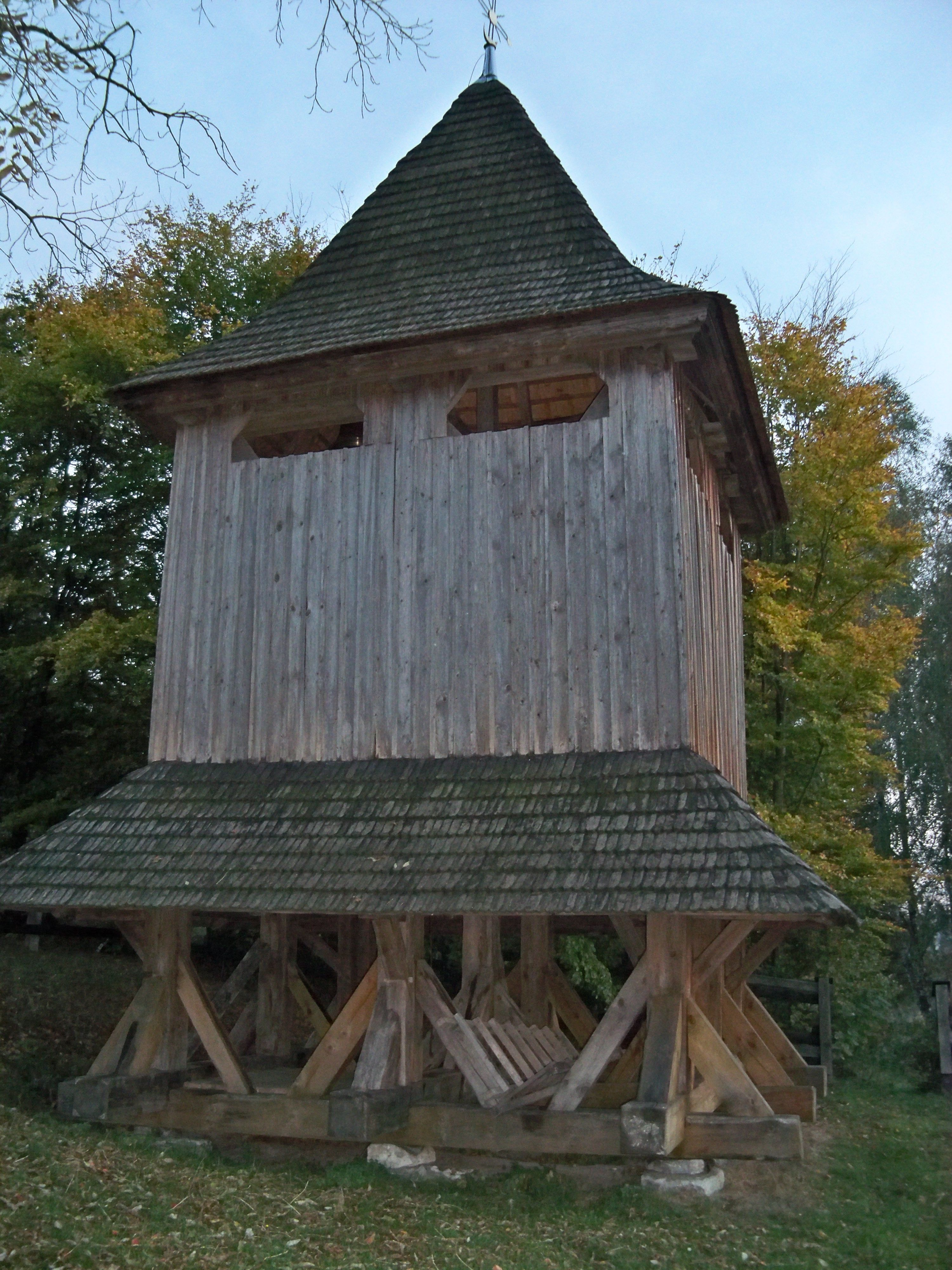
Belltower

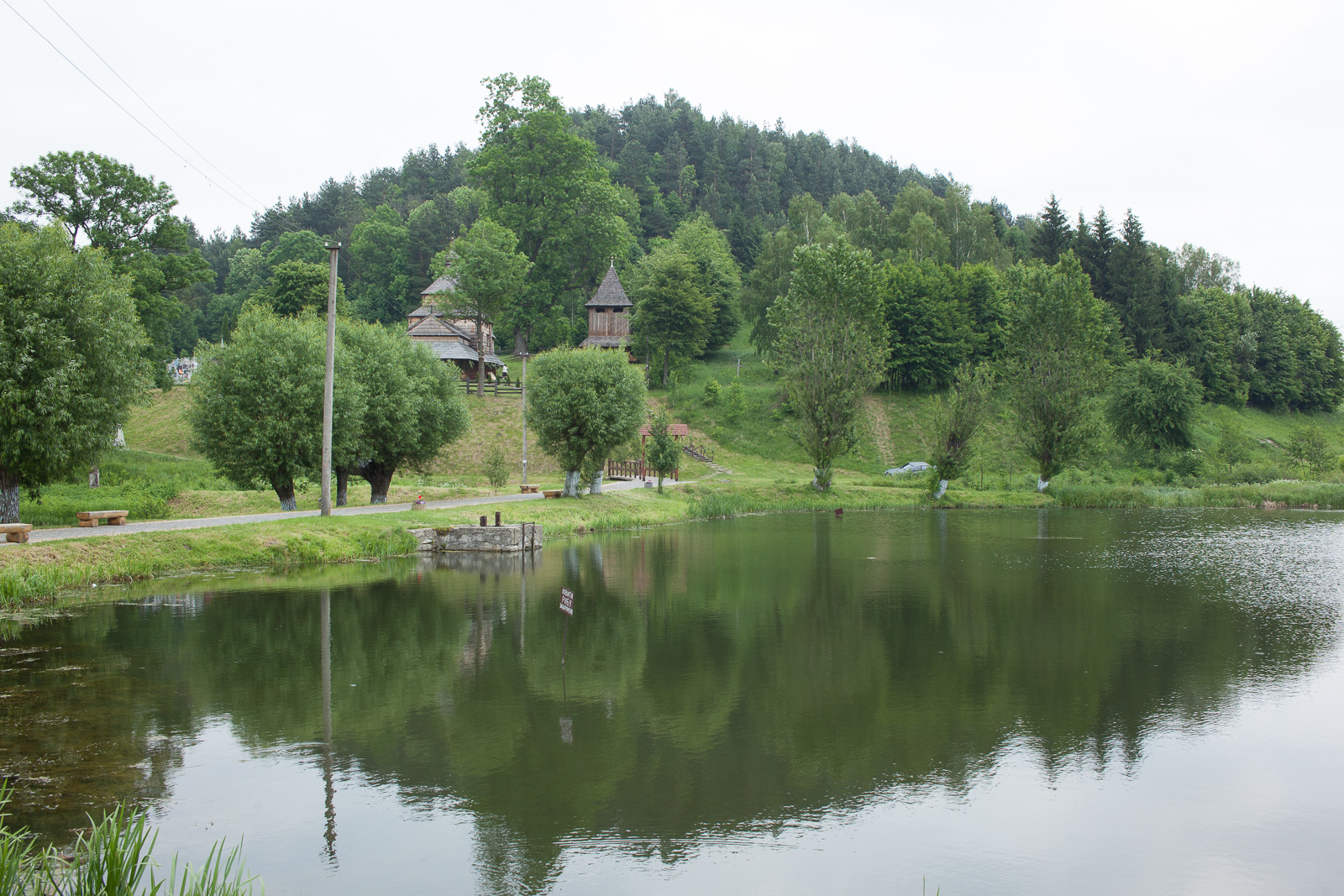
Riverside

== See also ==
- Wooden churches in Ukraine
