= Cassian Sakowicz =

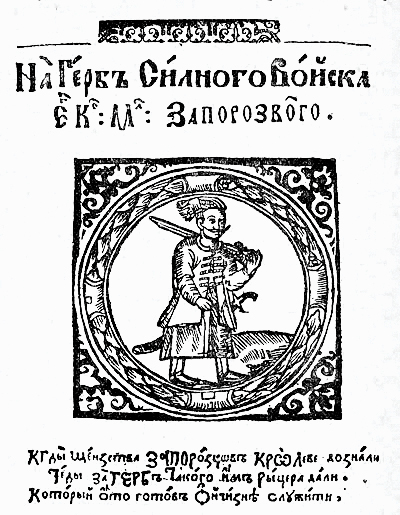
A page with a fragment of the "Poems for mourning funeral of the noble knight Petro Konashevych Sahaidachny («ВѢршѢ на жалосный погреб зацного рыцера Петра Конашевича Сагайдачного….»); title says "For coat of arms of the HRG Strong Host of Zaporizhia" (На Гербъ Силного Войска Е.К.М. Запорозкого)

Cassian Sakowicz, also known as Kasjan Sakowicz (1578–1647), was a Polish–Ruthenian Orthodox activist, and later a Catholic theologian, writer and polemicist.

== Biography ==
Cassian Sakowicz was born in family of an Orthodox priest as Kalikst Isakowicz. He was born in a town of Podtelisz (today village Potelych, Lviv Oblast), Belz Voivodeship (Palatinatus Belzensis). He finished the Zamojski Academy and Jagiellonian University at the ruler's court in Przemysl, under King Athanasius' protection. Sakowicz was a private teacher of Adam Kisiel and an activist of the Enlightenment movement of Orthodox brotherhood. Sakowicz was the rector of the Orthodox brotherhood school in Kyiv (predecessor of the Kyiv-Mohyla Academy) from 1620 to 1624 where he taught poetry, rhetoric and philosophy. In 1624, he moved to Lublin where he was preaching in an Eastern orthodox brotherhood church. Later Sakowicz entwined his life first with the Uniate Church in 1625 converted to Greek Catholicism (in 1625 to 1639, he was an Uniate archimandrite of the Savior-Transfiguration Monastery in Dubno). In 1641, after arriving to Kraków in 1640 and with the permission of Pope Urban VIII, he changed to the Roman Rite and was the chaplain of the Augustinian monastery of Saint Catherine in Kraków. Sakowicz died in Kraków in 1647.

Sakowicz is an author of the 1622 "poems for mourning funeral of the noble knight Petro Konashevych Sahaidachny" that were read by students of the Kyiv brotherhood school at the 1622 funeral of Hetman Petro Konashevych Sahaidachny.

== Works ==
Sakowicz was the author of many poems, theological treaties, and political treaties. His preferred writing languages were Ukrainian and Polish.
