= Rava-Ruska (border checkpoint) =

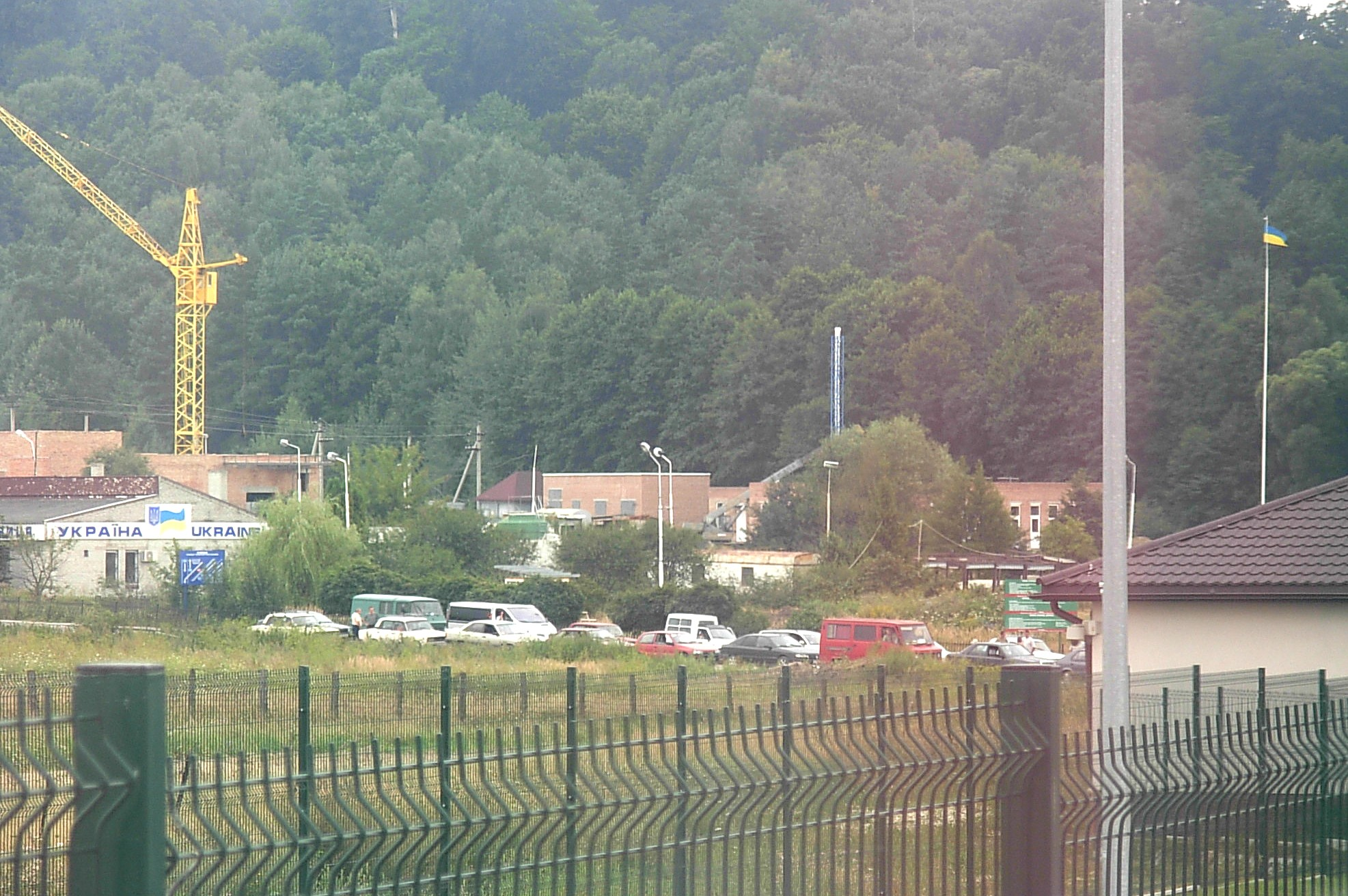

Locaiton
- Country: Ukraine
- Location: Rava-Ruska, Lviv Raion, Lviv Oblast
- Coordinates: 50°16′25″N 23°35′23″E

Rava-Ruska is a land border crossing between Ukraine and Poland on the Ukrainian side, near the city of Rava-Ruska, Lviv Raion, Lviv Oblast.

The crossing is situated on autoroute E372 ( M 09) Warsaw - Lviv. Across the border on the Polish side is the village of Hrebenne, Tomaszów County, Lublin Voivodeship. The border crossing is located 8 km (5.0 mi) west of the city of Rava-Ruska. In the city at a rail station is rail border checkpoint that however serves freight trains only.

The type of crossing is automobile and lorries but not pedestrians however they are planning to build a crossing for pedestrians in the future The port of entry is part of the Rava-Ruska customs post of Lviv customs.

== See also ==
- Poland–Ukraine border
- State Border of Ukraine
- Highway M09 (Ukraine)
