= Edward Olearczyk =

Polish composer

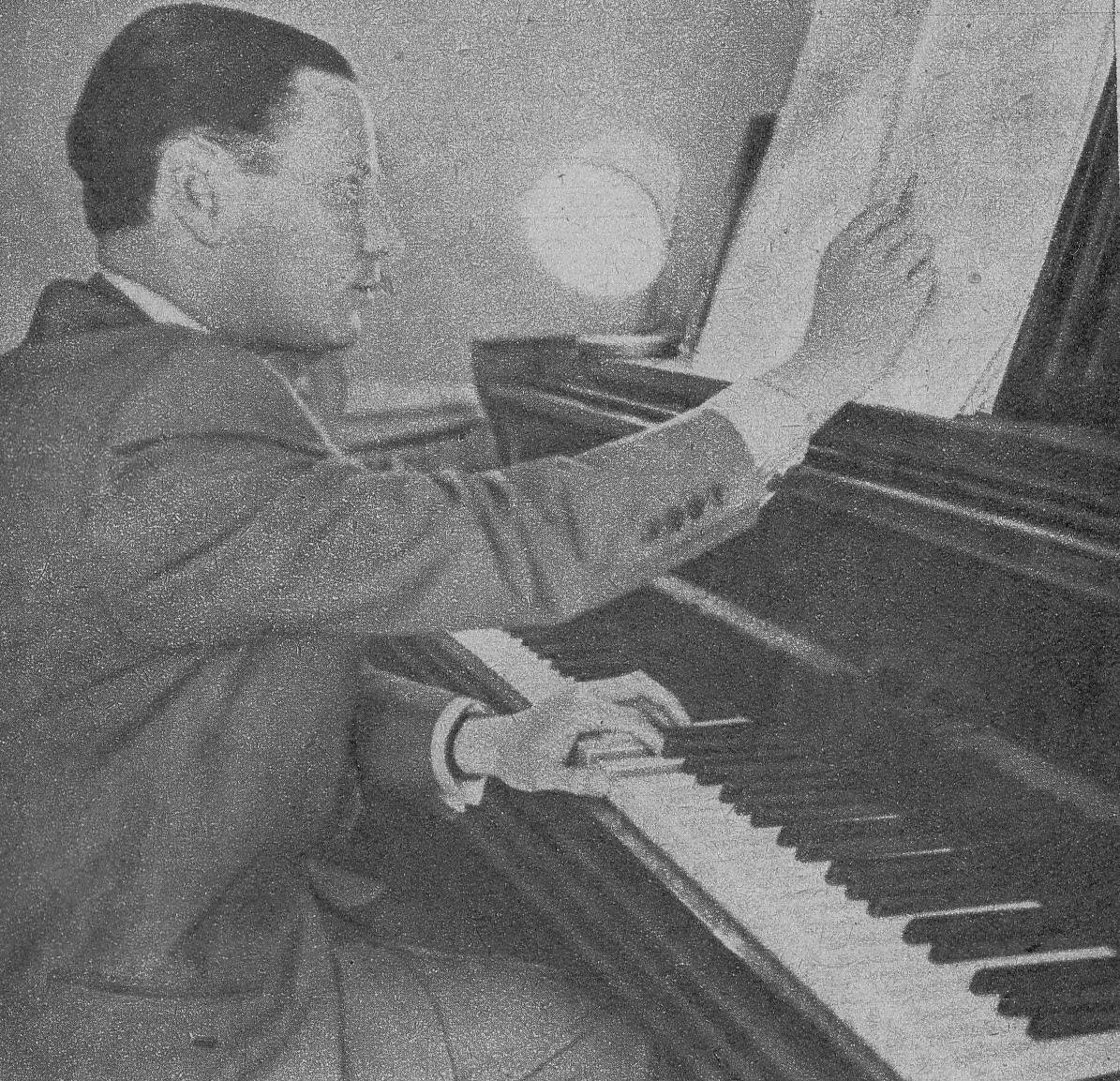
Edward Olearczyk in 1955

Edward Olearczyk (born 4 March 1915, d. 1994) was a Polish composer. He was born in Rawa Ruska into a Jewish family, and studied with Zbigniew Drzewiecki at the conservatory in Warsaw. From 1939 to 1945 he worked in the USSR, and after returning to Poland, worked in Warsaw as a stage director in the Polish Army.

Olearczyk was known primarily as a composer of popular songs. In 1948 he won the Ministry of Culture and Arts competition for popular songs. In 1952 he initiated the radio shows, "We sing songs: learning songs on the radio." His songs enjoyed great popularity, some even outside the country, especially in the USSR. In 1952, he received the Gold Cross of Merit Award and in 1957 an award from the city of Warsaw. In 1957 he moved to Israel and died there in 1994.

He married his wife Tamara prior to their immigration to Israel in 1957, along with their son Alon Oleartchik (then Alexi Olearczyk), who is currently a famous musician in Israel. His grandson is Israeli actor and past member of American indie rock band Big Thief, Max Oleartchik.

== Works ==
Selected works include:

- Melodie miłości (1952–53) - musical comedy, Miroslaw Łebkowski libretto
- Chłopska kołysanka (sł. Wacław Stępień - 1941)
- Złączone dłonie- 1947 (sł. Robert Stiller - wyd. 1951)
- Piosenka o pepeszy (sł. Tadeusz Urgacz - 1949)
- Miliony rąk (sł. Krzysztof Gruszczyński - 1947 (wyd. 1949)
- Pieśń na cześć towarzysza Bieruta (sł. Jerzy Jurandot - 1949)
- Żołnierze z ZMP (sł. Robert Stiller - 1950)
- Pokój! Mir! Frieden! Paix! (sł. Mirosław Łebkowski - 1950)
- Nasza Partia (sł. Henryk Gaworski - 1950)
- Sztafeta pokoju (sł. Wojciech Lipniacki - 1951)
- Miasto pokoju (sł. Henryk Gaworski - 1951)
- Na strażnicy (sł. Mirosław Łebkowski - 1951)
- Stawaj bracie (sł. Roman Sadowski - 1952)
- Przed świtem (sł. Tadeusz Urgacz - 1952)
- Skowronek (sł. Jacek Bocheński - 1952)
- Kołysanka warszawska (sł. Robert Stiller - 1952)
- Młoda piosenka (sł. Jerzy Jurandot - 1952)
- Saperzy, saperzy (sł.Mirosław Łebkowski - 1952)
- Piosenka o wiosennym siewie (sł. M. Łebkowski - 1952)
- Pociąg zlotowy (sł. M. Łebkowski - 1952)
- MDM (sł. Helena Kołaczkowska - 1953)
- Przysięgamy ci Ojczyzno (sł. Stanisław Ryszard Dobrowolski - 1953)
- Na start (sł. Bogumił Smyła - 1953)
- Spotkanie Murmańsk - Wisła (sł. Stanisław Czachorowski - 1953)
- Piosenka o samolocie Iliuszyn (sł. Robert Stiller - 1953)
- Żegnał chłopiec dziewczynę (sł. Stanisław Werner - 1953)
- Walc (sł. Jerzy Medyński - 1954)
- Melodia Starego Miasta (sł. M. Łebkowski - 1954)
- Piosenka o tobie i o mnie (sł. Władysław Krzemiński - 1954)
- Wieczorem nad Wisłą (sł. M. Łebkowski i T. Urgacz) - 1955)
- Powracali trzej chłopcy (sł. M. Łebkowski - 1955)
- Błękitny staw (sł. H.Kołaczkowska - 1955)
- Pewnie miła zapomniałaś (sł. M. Łebkowski - 1955)
- Pochwała młodości (sł. S. R. Dobrowolski - 1956)
- Walc maturzystów (sł.M.Łebkowski i T. Urgacz - 1956)
- Dwa wiosła (sł. Wanda Chotomska - 1956)
- Sama nie wiem, skąd to (sł. H. Kołaczkowska - 1957)
- Nie wszystko się zmieniło (sł. M. Łebkowski - 1957)
- Już dawno domyśliłam się (sł. Jan Gałkowski i Mirosław Łebkowski - 1958)
- To mój świat prześniony (sł. M. Łebkowski)
