= Rava-Ruska =

City in Lviv Oblast, Ukraine

Rava-Ruska Рава-Руська Rawa Ruska
- City
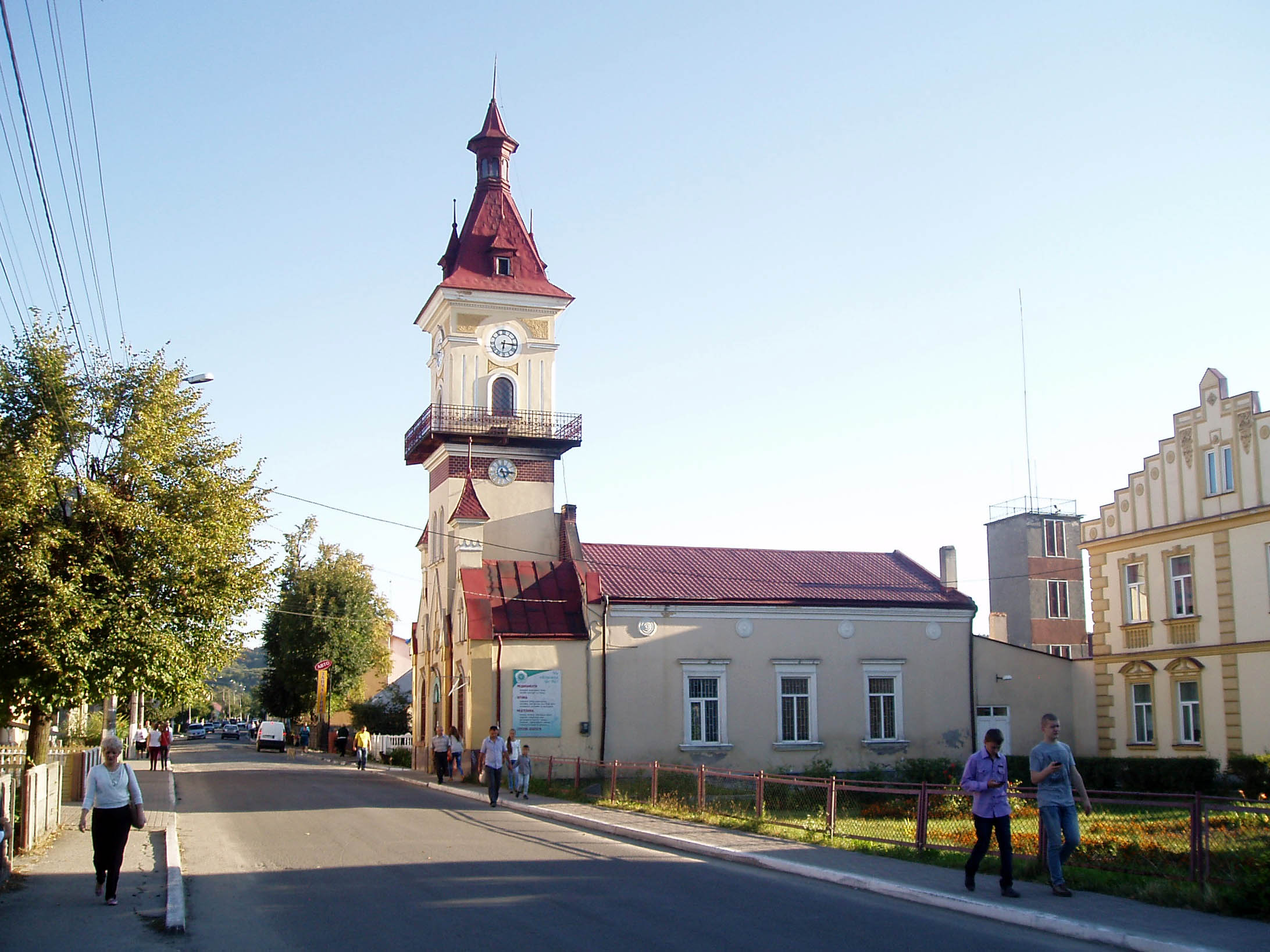
- City hall

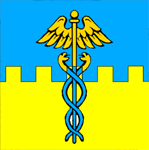
- Flag Coat of arms
- Interactive map of Rava-Ruska
- Location within Ukraine Rava-Ruska (Ukraine)
- Coordinates: 50°13′30″N 23°37′27″E
- Country: Ukraine
- Oblast: Lviv Oblast
- Raion: Lviv Raion
- Hromada: Rava-Ruska urban hromada
- Founded: 1455
- Named for: Rawa Mazowiecka

Area
  - Total: 8.5 km^{2} (3.3 sq mi)
- Elevation: 349 m (1,145 ft)

Population (2022)
  - Total: 8,494
  - Density: 1,000/km^{2} (2,600/sq mi)

Rava-Ruska (Ukrainian: Рава-Руська, IPA: [ˈrɑwɐ ˈrusʲkɐ]; Polish: Rawa Ruska; Yiddish: ראווע, romanized: Rave) is a city in Lviv Raion, Lviv Oblast, western Ukraine. It is a border town between Ukraine and Poland. The border checkpoint is situated 8 km (5 mi) west of the city, along the international autoroute Warsaw–Lviv. Rava-Ruska hosts the administration of Rava-Ruska urban hromada, one of the hromadas of Ukraine. Its population is approximately 8,494 (2022 estimate).

== History ==
Historical population
Year	Pop.	±%
1921	8,970	—
1931	11,146	+24.3%
2022	8,494	−23.8%

Rawa-Ruska was founded in 1455 by the Polish prince Władysław I of Płock, Duke of Bełz and Mazovia. He added the suffix "Ruska", meaning "Ruthenian" (during this time, the urban Ukrainian inhabitants were referred to as "Ruthenians"), to distinguish it from Rawa Mazowiecka located further west. Due to a convenient location along the merchant trail from Lublin to Lviv, the newly located town quickly developed. For centuries, Rawa was part of the Kingdom of Poland and the Polish–Lithuanian Commonwealth. It remained in private hands of several consecutive szlachta families, such as the Głogowski, Suchodolski, Rzeczycki and Bogusz. In 1622, the town received permission of the King of Poland to organize fairs. In 1672, a skirmish between Polish and Crimean Tatar forces took place here, in which Polish unit under Atanazy Miączyński freed hundreds of captured peasants. In 1698, Rawa was the site of a meeting between Peter the Great and Augustus the Strong, which led to the Treaty of Preobrazhenskoye in 1699.

From the First Partition of Poland in 1772 until the end of World War I in 1918, the town was part of the Austrian Partition ruled first by the Austrian Empire and then by Austria-Hungary after the compromise of 1867. It was a seat of the Rawa Ruska district, one of the 78 Bezirkshauptmannschaften in Austrian Galicia province (Crown land) in 1900. In 1880, its population was 10,500, with 37% Jews, 35% Poles, 20% Germans and 7% Ukrainians. In 1857, Rawa received a rail connection with Jarosław, and next year, the railroad reached Sokal.

=== 20th century ===
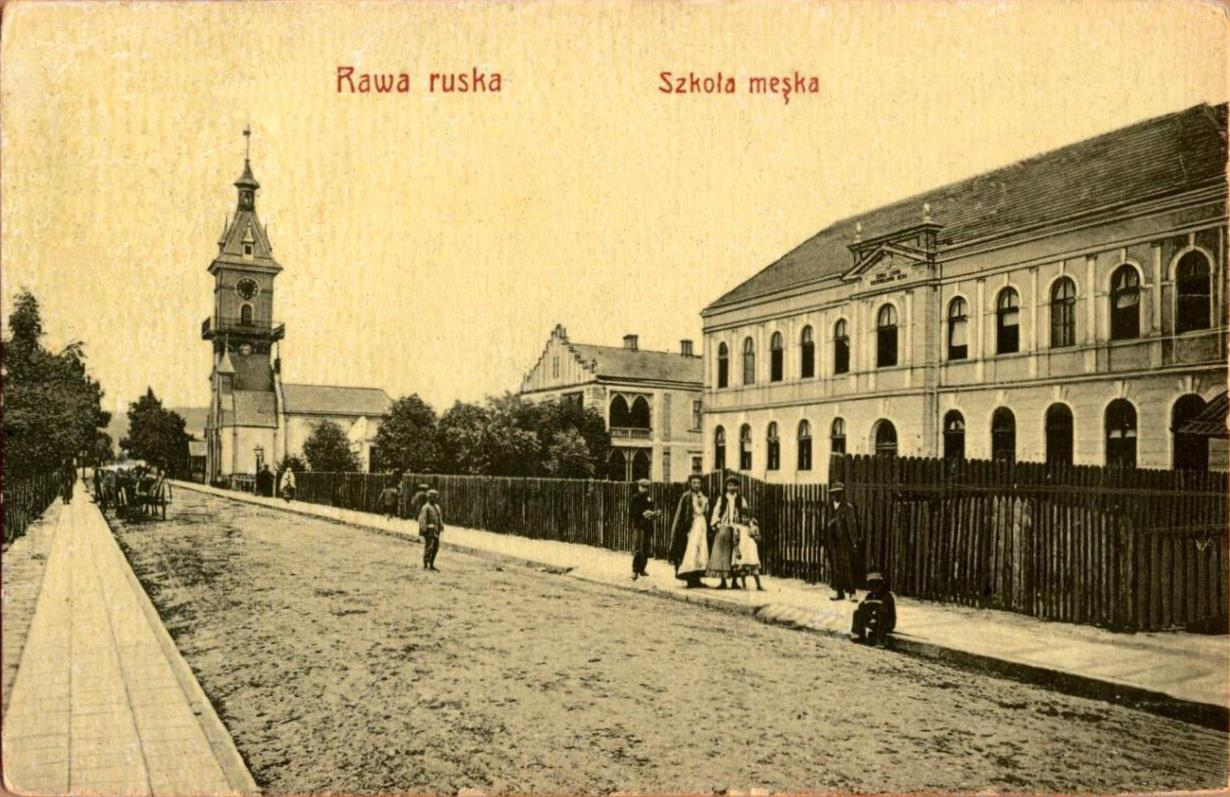
Early 20th-century view of the town

In the early 20th century, Rava-Ruska developed into a rail junction, with a connection to Lviv and Rejowiec, built in 1915. After the rebirth of Poland Rawa-Ruska became part of the Lwów Voivodeship, and the seat of the Powiat Rawski county (area 1,401 km^{2} (541 sq mi)). The line from to Rejowiec was of leading importance, as it connected the two main cities of Poland, Warsaw, and Lviv. Due to the rail lines, Rawa prospered, and several businesses operated in the town. In 1924, a Belgian company opened here a factory of railroad ties. Furthermore, in the interbellum period Rawa Ruska was home to Main School of the Border Guard, which was moved there in 1928 from Góra Kalwaria. The school had a department of training of guard dogs, also located in Rawa-Ruska.

According to Polish census of 1921, the population of the town was 8,970; with 42% Poles, 42% Jews and 14% Ukrainians. By 1938, the population increased to 12,000.

==== World War II and the Holocaust ====
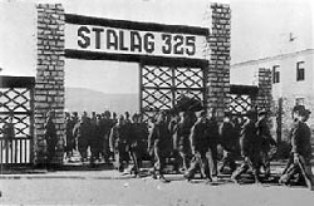
Stalag 325 prisoner-of-war camp during World War II

On 14 September 1939, during the Invasion of Poland, Rava-Ruska was captured by the Wehrmacht. The German troops left the town within days in accordance with the German–Soviet Frontier Treaty, and Rava-Ruska was occupied by the Soviet forces. On the 28 June 1941, it was recaptured by the Germans during the German invasion of the Soviet Union, Operation Barbarossa. The Ukrainian People's Militsiya was formed. The town was incorporated into the General Government territory.

The Judenrat was established in July 1941. In March 1942 the nearby Belzec extermination camp began its killing operations, and at the end of the month the first transport of 1,000 Jews left Rava-Ruska for Belzec. Many Jewish residents were killed at Belzec in further deportations, usually organized by the Germans and assisted by the Ukrainian police and civilian volunteers. Approximately 5,000 Polish Jews from Rava-Ruska were shot during a liquidation Aktion between 7 and 11 December 1942. The last mass shootings of Jews occurred in June 1943, during which 300-400 Jews were killed in a forest outside the village.

The Germans also operated the Stalag 325 prisoner-of-war camp for French and Belgian POWs in the town, following its relocation from Zamość and before its further relocation to Lwów. There were poor conditions in the camp with POWs being subjected to harassment and beatings by the German guards and suffering from hunger and epidemics, resulting in a high death rate. Many POWs were sent to forced labour subcamps in the region, and the local populace shared food with the prisoners despite the danger.

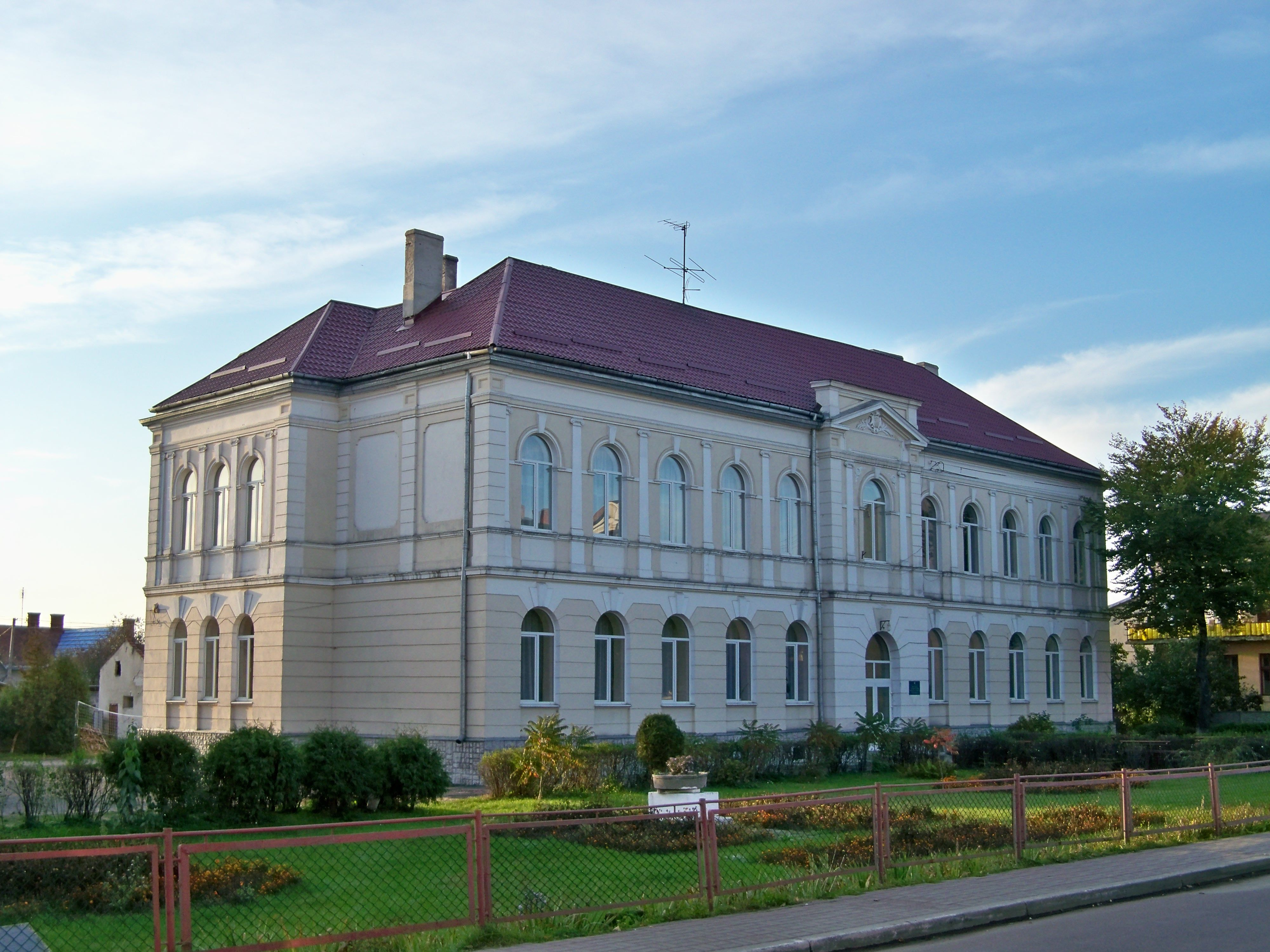
School building

==== After World War II ====
After World War II, the Polish community of Rava-Ruska was forced to abandon the town and move to the Recovered Territories. Nevertheless, Rava-Ruska remains one of the key centres of the Polish minority in Ukraine, with the local office of the Association of Polish Culture of the Lviv Land operating here.

Until 18 July 2020, Rava-Ruska belonged to Zhovkva Raion. The raion was abolished in July 2020 as part of the administrative reform of Ukraine, which reduced the number of raions of Lviv Oblast to seven. The area of Zhovkva Raion was merged into Lviv Raion.

== Geography ==
=== Climate ===
Climate data for Rava-Ruska (1981–2010)
Month	Jan	Feb	Mar	Apr	May	Jun	Jul	Aug	Sep	Oct	Nov	Dec	Year
Mean daily maximum °C (°F)	0.2 (32.4)	1.6 (34.9)	6.6 (43.9)	14.0 (57.2)	19.8 (67.6)	22.3 (72.1)	24.3 (75.7)	23.9 (75.0)	18.6 (65.5)	13.2 (55.8)	6.4 (43.5)	1.3 (34.3)	12.7 (54.9)
Daily mean °C (°F)	−2.7 (27.1)	−1.8 (28.8)	2.2 (36.0)	8.3 (46.9)	13.8 (56.8)	16.6 (61.9)	18.5 (65.3)	17.8 (64.0)	13.1 (55.6)	8.3 (46.9)	2.9 (37.2)	−1.4 (29.5)	8.0 (46.4)
Mean daily minimum °C (°F)	−5.6 (21.9)	−5.0 (23.0)	−1.5 (29.3)	3.1 (37.6)	8.2 (46.8)	11.4 (52.5)	13.3 (55.9)	12.5 (54.5)	8.6 (47.5)	4.4 (39.9)	-0.0 (32.0)	−4.0 (24.8)	3.8 (38.8)
Average precipitation mm (inches)	35.5 (1.40)	35.5 (1.40)	41.7 (1.64)	44.1 (1.74)	77.9 (3.07)	76.3 (3.00)	90.1 (3.55)	77.5 (3.05)	70.3 (2.77)	44.0 (1.73)	43.6 (1.72)	40.0 (1.57)	676.5 (26.63)
Average precipitation days (≥ 1.0 mm)	8.7	9.1	8.7	8.5	10.9	10.5	10.4	8.5	9.0	7.5	9.5	9.8	111.1
Average relative humidity (%)	84.1	82.0	77.7	70.6	71.4	74.4	75.3	75.8	80.0	81.3	84.9	86.0	78.6
Source: NOAA

== Transportation ==
It is located near the border with Poland, opposite the town of Hrebenne. Through the city passes the European route E372. At the border there is a "checkpoint Rava-Ruska".

=== Rail station ===
The city has a railroad station which also has a border and customs checkpoint. Since 2005 it has been used exclusively for freight transportation only and has two directions, one towards Hrebenne, another towards Werchrata.

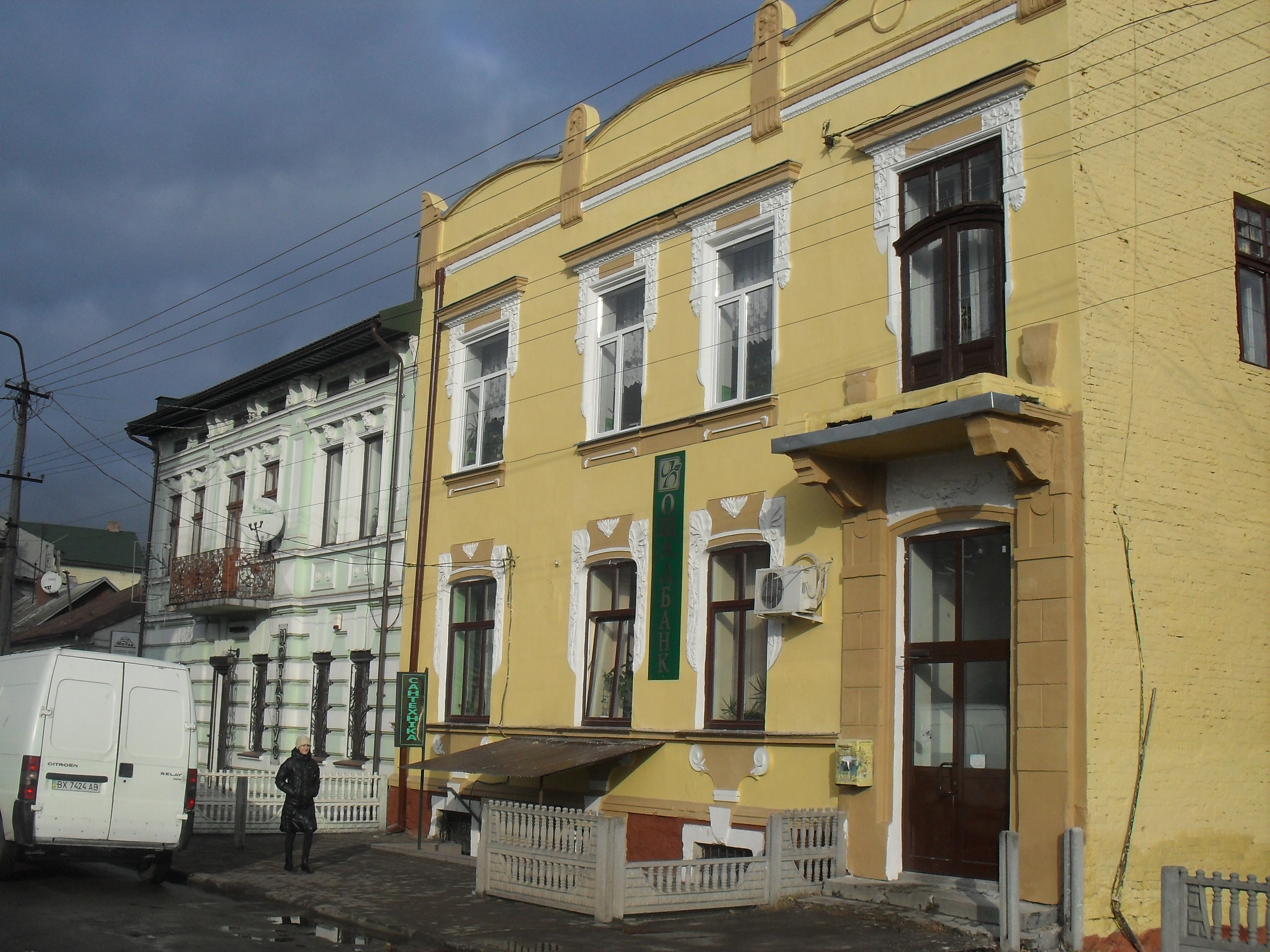
Old town of Rava-Ruska

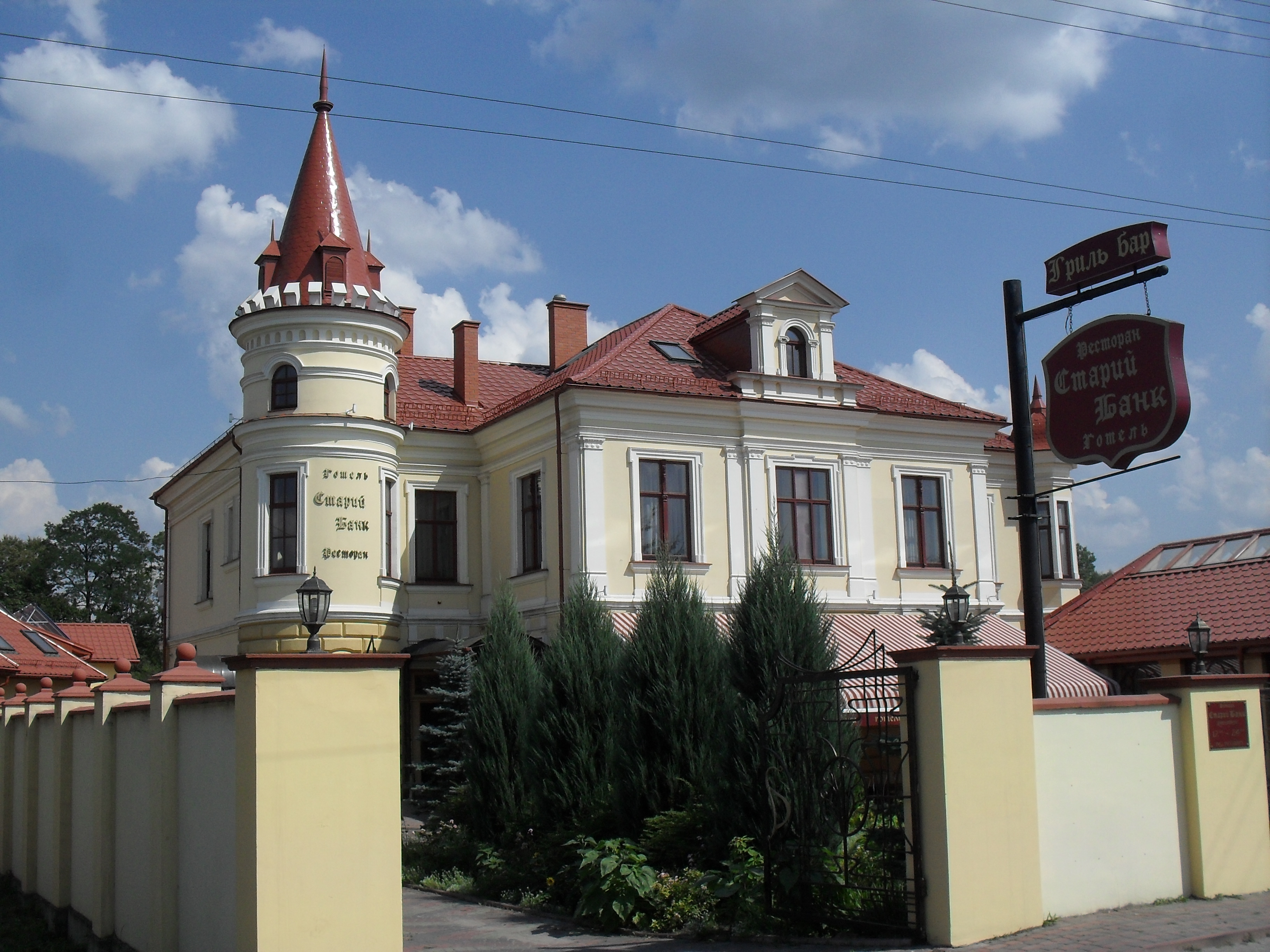
"Old Bank" Hotel

== Points of interest ==
- Parish church of St. Joseph, built in 1700 - 1776 upon the initiative of Castellan of Belz Andrzej Rzeczycki. During the Soviet era the church served as a warehouse.
- Franciscan Abbey of Archangel Michael, founded in 1725 by Starosta of Belz Grzegorz Rzeczycki and Jozef Glogowski. The complex of the abbey and the church was completed in 1737 by architect Pawel Fontana, and was one of the most interesting sights of the town. In the Soviet Union, the complex was turned into a warehouse serving the local collective farm.

== Notable people ==
- Walter V. Bozyk (1908-1991), conductor, bandurist
- Maurice Abraham Cohen (1851–1923), Australian educator and linguist
- Edward Olearczyk (1915-1994), Polish composer
- Yuri Skorupsky (born 1965), Ukrainian-American painter, monumentalist
- Iryna Vereshchuk (born 1979), deputy prime minister of Ukraine
- Haim Yosef Zadok (born Haim Wilkenfeld; 1913–2002), Israeli jurist and Israeli Minister of Development, Minister of Trade and Industry, Minister of Religious Affairs, Minister of Justice, and Minister of Religious Affairs

== See also ==
- Rawa Mazowiecka
