= Didascaly =

Didascaly, Greek Antiquity [modern ad. Greek διδασκαλία instruction, teaching; in plural as in quotation. So modern French didascalie.]

1. In The Catalogues of the ancient Greek Dramas, with their writers, dates, etc., such as were compiled by Aristotle and others.
2. The instruction of the chorus in ancient Greek theatre.
3. In ancient Greek theatre, the performance of a tetralogy.

== Examples ==
- 1831 T. L. Peacock, Crotchet Castle vi. M887 70 "Did not they give to melopoeia, choregraphy, and the sundry forms of didascalies [printed -ics], the precedence of all other matters, civil and military?"
- 1849 Grote Greece 11. lxvii. (1862) VI. 26 "The first, second and third [tetralogies] are specified in the Didaskalics or Theatrical Records."

== See also ==
- Didascaliae
- Didascalia Apostolorum
