= Ukrainian National Museum, Chicago =

Museum in Chicago, Illinois, United States

Ukrainian National Museum
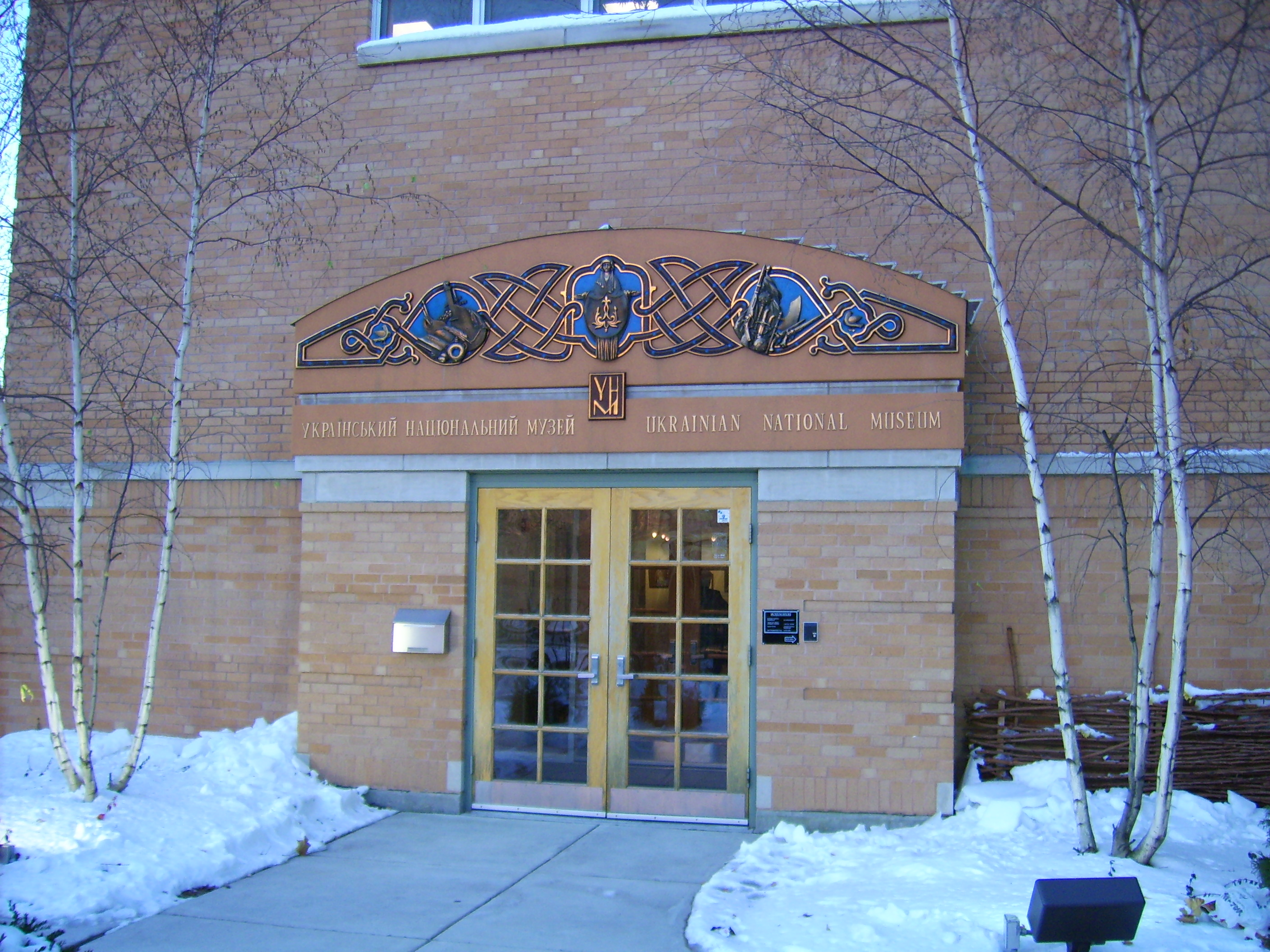
- Established: 1952
- Location: 2249 West Superior Street; Chicago, Illinois
- Coordinates: 41.8949°N 87.6838°W
- Type: Ethnic
- Website: ukrainiannationalmuseum.org

Ukrainian National Museum (UNM) is located in the historical Ukrainian Village neighborhood of Chicago, United States. It is home to a plethora of Ukrainian artifacts, artwork, musical instruments, and embroidered folk costumes among its growing collection.

== Collections ==
The Ukrainian National Museum was founded in 1952 as the Ukrainian Museum and Archive. The Museum collections include artifacts of traditional folk arts, such as embroidery, costumes, weavings and wood and metal inlays as well as musical instruments, household utensils, souvenir materials from the Soviet Union, and artwork by Ukrainian immigrants.

The museum collection includes 1,140 artifacts covering traditional folk arts, agricultural tools, artworks, musical instruments, trophies, and other miscellaneous artifacts. The UNM library has 16,320 titles; it includes rare books, author autographed editions, monographs on émigré communities, contemporary editions, and over 600 periodicals and newspapers. The archives house material about Ukrainian communities, particularly in Chicago, including Ukrainian performance groups, national youth chapters, veteran and fraternal organizations, local church archives, 1933 Chicago World's Fair memorabilia, personal manuscripts of civic leaders and an extensive photographic collection.

Also on display are decorated Easter Eggs—"Pysanky" a Ukrainian staple folk art. The oldest designs are called ideograms, but the painted eggs share a common theme: the sun (represented by a tripod); a rose and stars in various patterns. Ukrainian embroidery, a highly developed folk art, is included in the collection. In addition, on display are Ukrainian language books received in donation from immigrants and visitors coming from Europe. An exhibit "Ukrainian Genocide -Holodomor of 1932-1933" showcases photographs, documents and newspaper articles dedicated to providing the public with information about the forced famine in Ukraine. An exhibit dealing with Chicago's unique Ukrainian community complete the museum exhibits.

The collection is classified in the language of publication. The archives include material about Ukrainian communities, particularly in Chicago. In August 2020, the museum's updated exposition was presented, which included an exhibition developed by the National Museum of the Holodomor Genocide, "We Were Killed Because We Are Ukrainians." This project was made possible through cooperation with the Ukrainian Genocide Foundation of the United States (Mykola Kocherha, Chairman).

== Notable Exhibitions ==
=== World Through the Eyes of the Artist (2018) ===
In February 2018, the museum presented World Through the Eyes of the Artist, a solo exhibition of original ballpoint pen and graphite drawings by Ukrainian-born artist Andrey Poletaev. The exhibition opened on February 2, 2018 and ran through February 25, 2018, with the museum requesting an extension of two additional weeks following strong audience response. The museum described Poletaev as "one of the founders" of ballpoint pen art as an independent contemporary art form. The exhibition received coverage in Ukrainian People Magazine and KP.UA, one of Ukraine's largest national newspapers.
