= List of extant ancient Greek and Roman plays =

While most ancient Greek and Roman plays have been lost to history, a significant number still survive. These include the comedies of Aristophanes and Menander, the tragedies of Aeschylus, Sophocles and Euripides, and the Roman adaptations of Plautus, Terence and Seneca.

In total, there are eighty-four mostly extant plays, forty-six from ancient Greece and thirty-eight from ancient Rome. Furthermore, there are eight lost plays with extensive surviving fragments, as well as thirteen mimes. They range from the 472 BC tragedy The Persians, written by the Greek playwright Aeschylus, to Querolus, an anonymous Roman comedy from late antiquity.

== Greek ==
=== Comedies ===
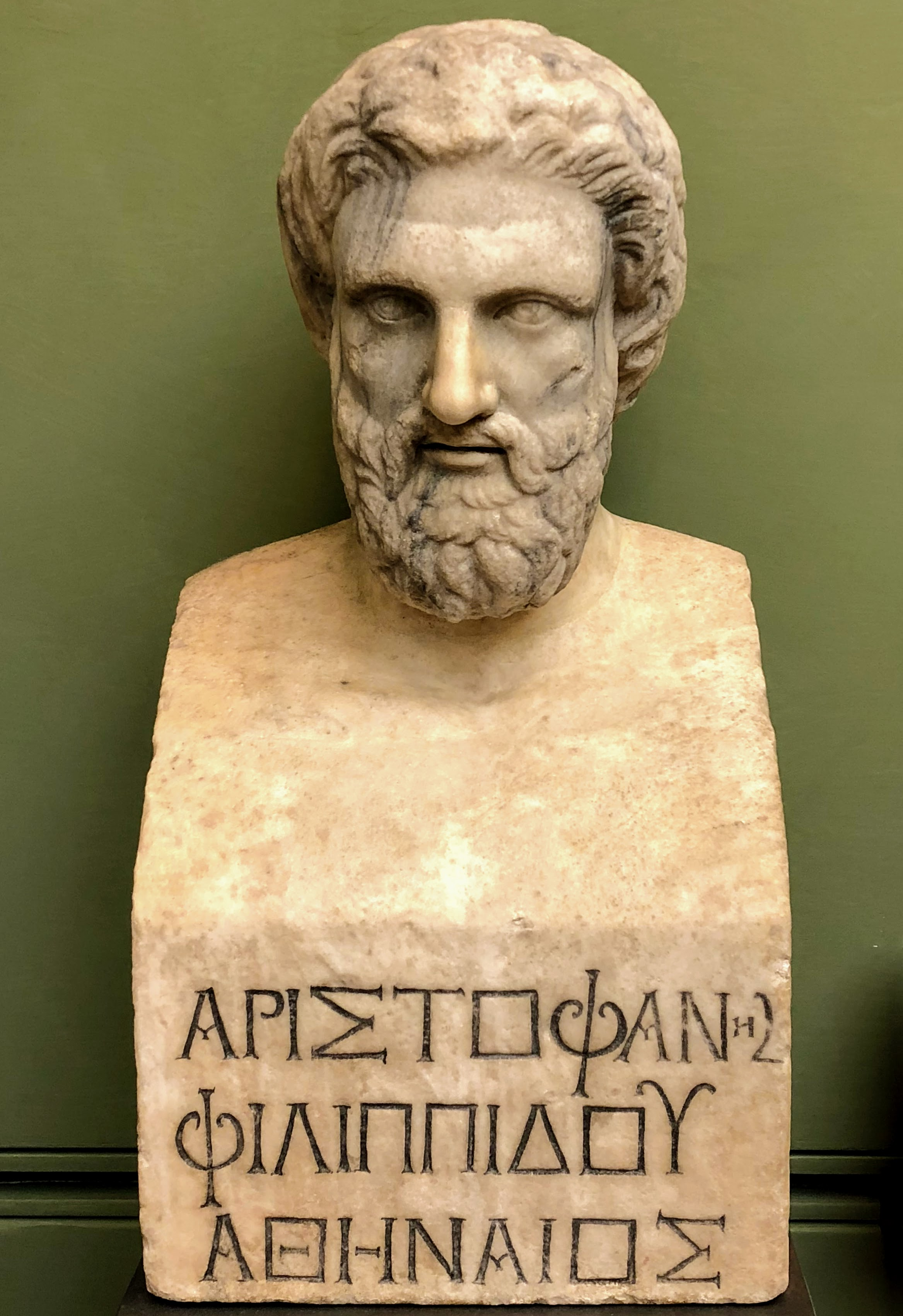
Aristophanes

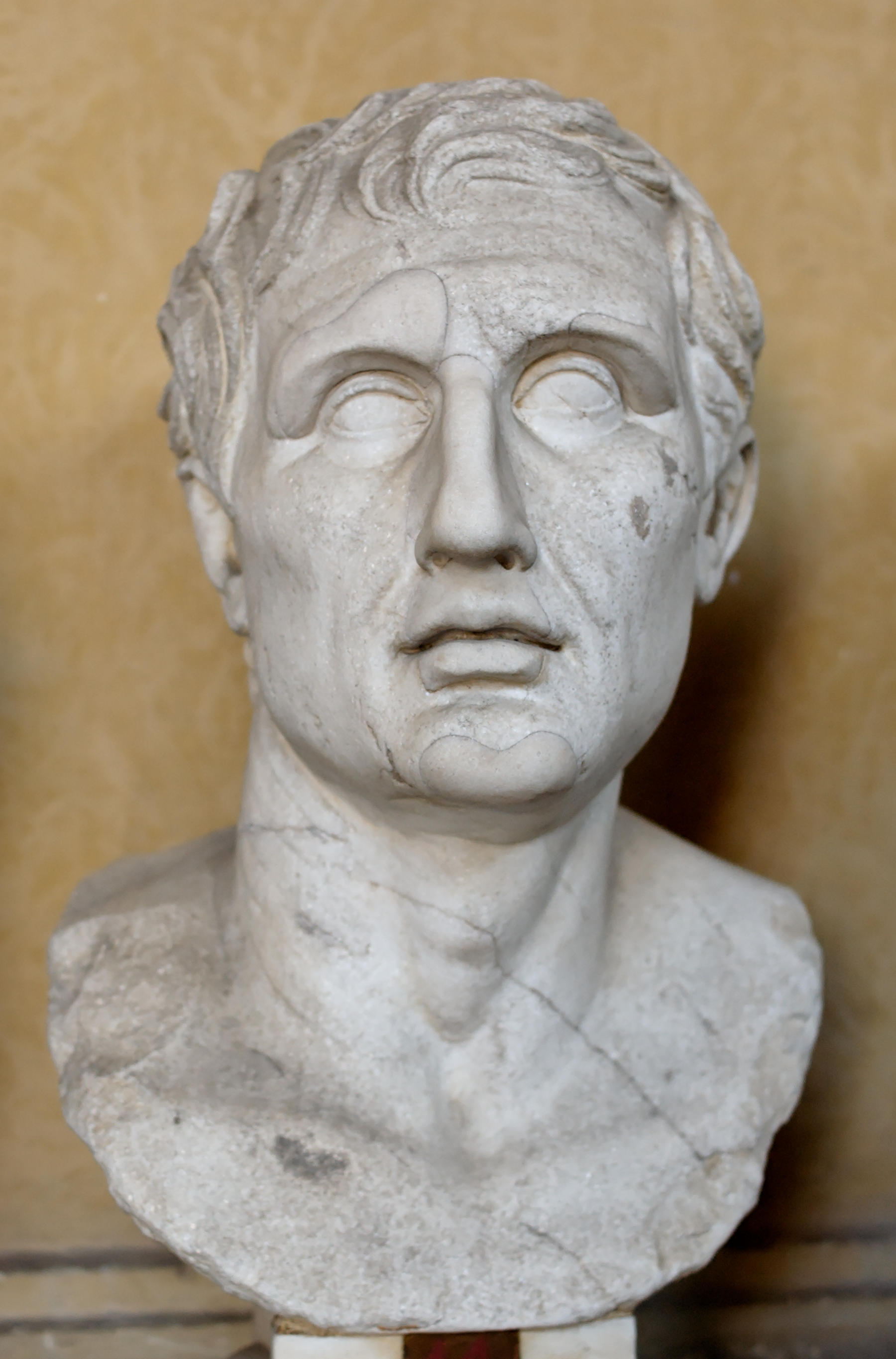
Menander

Ancient Greek comedy is conventionally divided into three periods: Old, Middle and New Comedy. Old Comedy survives through the eleven extant plays of Aristophanes and New Comedy through two mostly extant works of Menander. While Old Comedy parodied contemporary Athenian politics, leaders, and institutions, New Comedy features average citizens and parodies the cultural practices of the time. Middle Comedy is largely lost, preserved only in short fragments.

==== Aristophanes ====
- The Acharnians (425 BC)
- The Knights (424 BC)
- The Clouds (423 BC)
- The Wasps (422 BC)
- Peace (421 BC)
- The Birds (414 BC)
- Lysistrata (411 BC)
- Thesmophoriazusae (411 BC)
- The Frogs (405 BC)
- Ecclesiazusae (392 BC)
- Wealth (388 BC)

==== Menander ====
- Dyskolos (316 BC)
- Samia (309 BC)

Extensive fragments exist for another five plays: Aspis, Epitrepontes, Misoumenos, Perikeiromene and Sikyonioi.

=== Tragedies ===
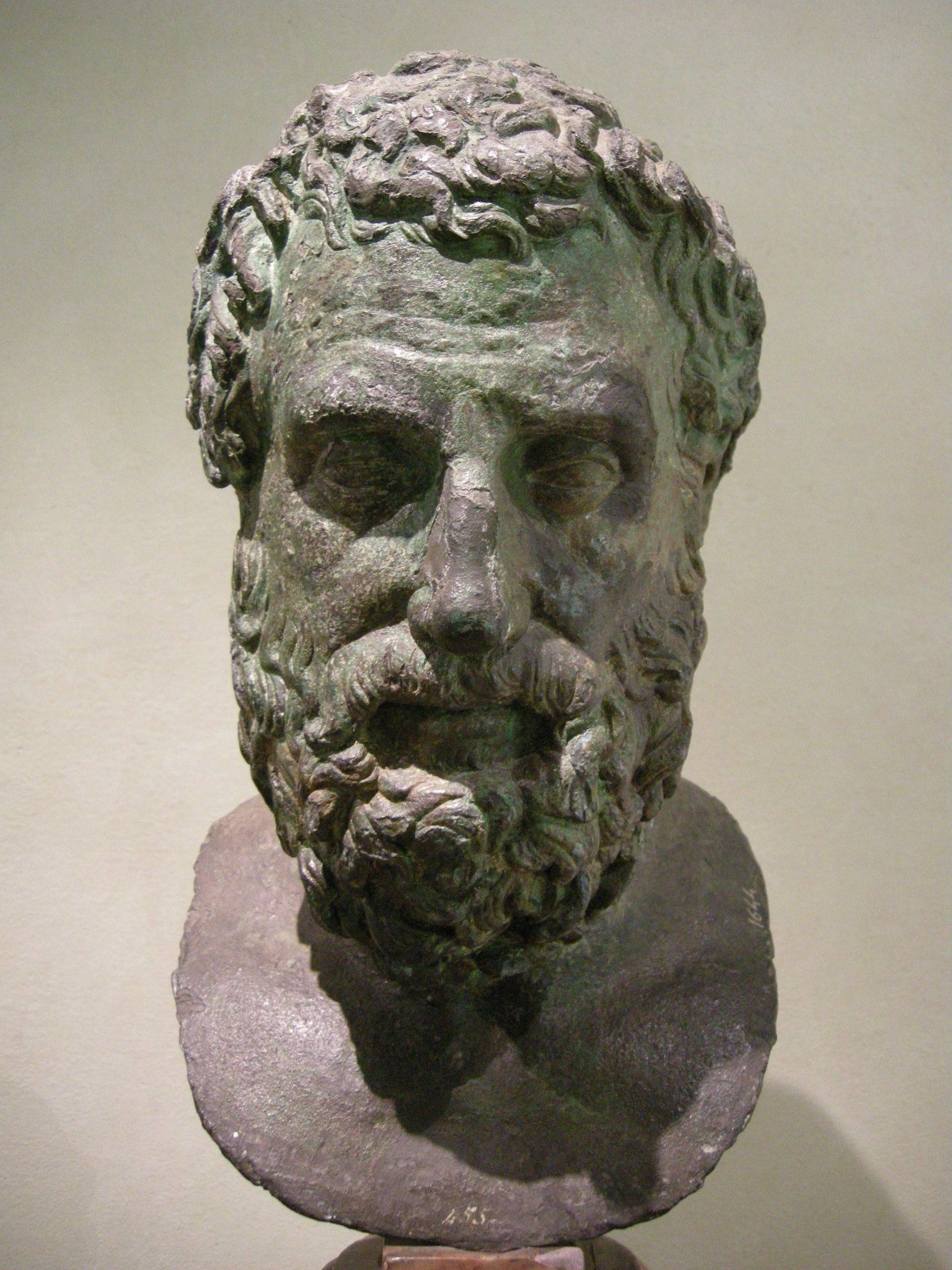
Aeschylus

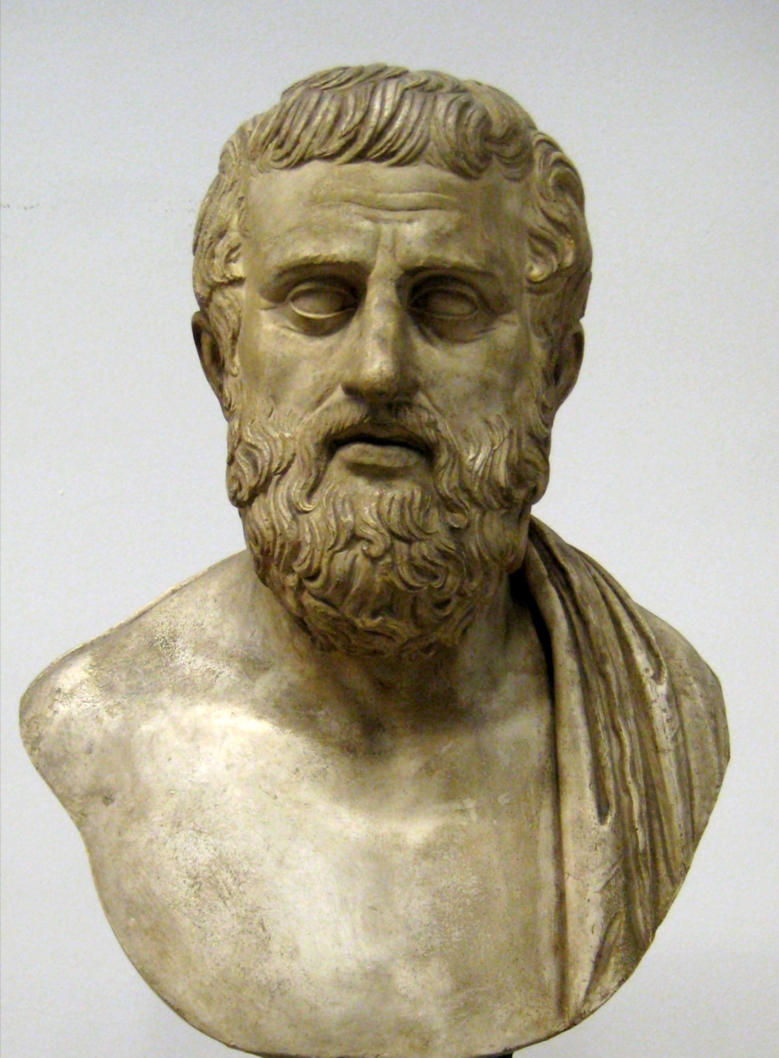
Sophocles

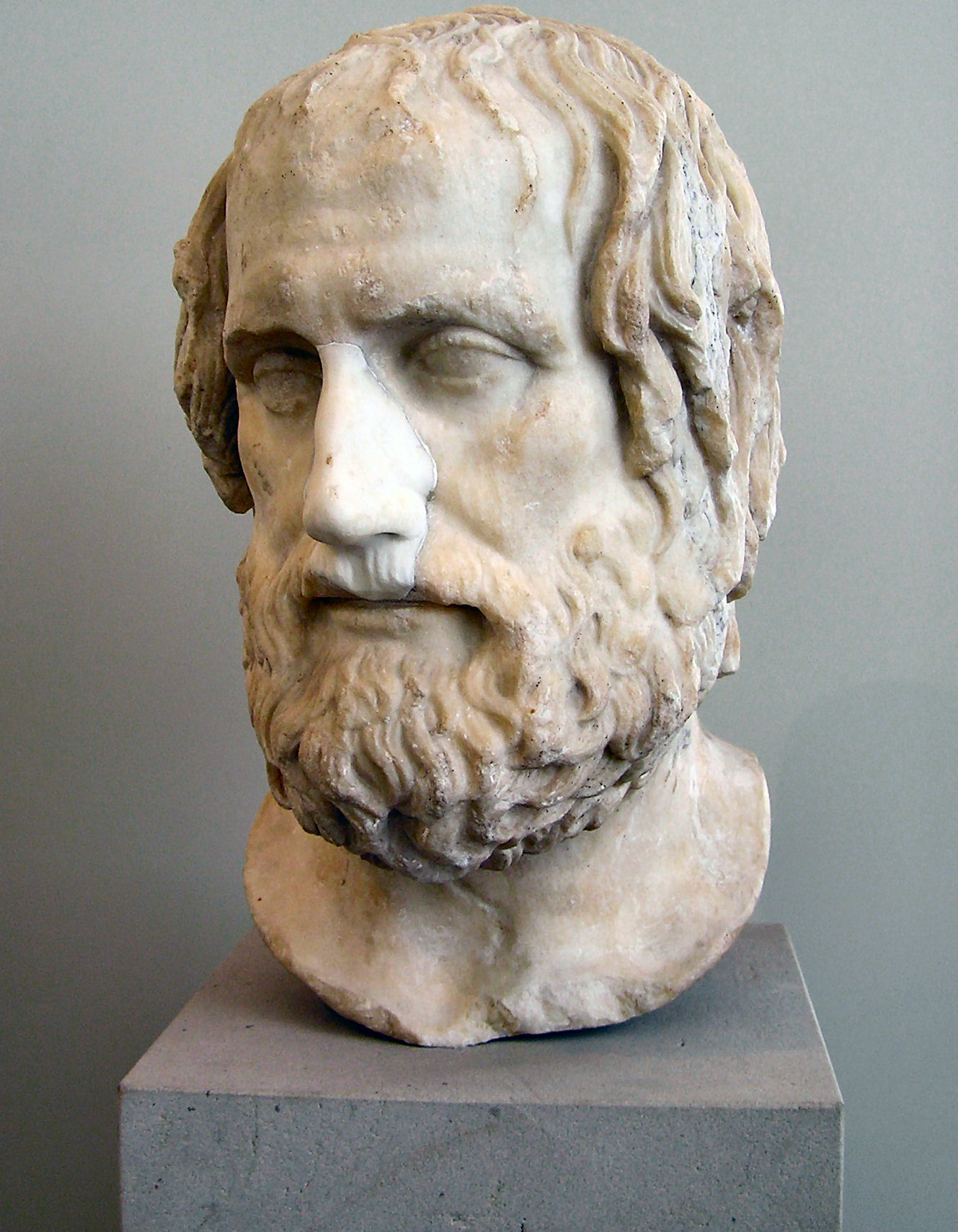
Euripides

Ancient Greek tragedies were most often based upon myths from the oral traditions, exploring human nature, fate, and the intervention of the gods. They evoke catharsis in the audience, a process through which the audience experiences pity and fear, and through that emotional engagement, purges these emotions. Greek tragedy survives through the works of Aeschylus, Sophocles, and Euripides.

==== Aeschylus ====
- The Persians (472 BC)
- Seven Against Thebes (467 BC)
- The Suppliants (463 BC)
- Agamemnon (458 BC)
- The Libation Bearers (458 BC)
- The Eumenides (458 BC)

==== Sophocles ====
- Ajax (442 BC)
- Antigone (441 BC)
- Women of Trachis (450–425 BC)
- Oedipus Rex (429 BC)
- Electra (420–414 BC)
- Philoctetes (409 BC)
- Oedipus at Colonus (406 BC)

==== Euripides ====
- Alcestis (438 BC)
- Medea (431 BC)
- Children of Heracles (430 BC)
- Hippolytus (428 BC)
- Andromache (425 BC)
- Hecuba (424 BC)
- The Suppliants (423 BC)
- Electra (420 BC)
- Herakles (416 BC)
- The Trojan Women (415 BC)
- Iphigenia in Tauris (414 BC)
- Ion (413 BC)
- Helen (412 BC)
- The Phoenician Women (410 BC)
- Orestes (408 BC)
- The Bacchae (406 BC)
- Iphigenia in Aulis (406 BC)

Extensive fragments exist for another play: Hypsipyle.

==== Other ====
- Prometheus Bound (479–424 BC) (attributed to Aeschylus, true author unknown)
- Rhesus (450–440 BC) (attributed to Euripides, true author unknown)

=== Satyr plays ===
Satyr plays feature mythological-heroic stories in a style of language similar to that of the tragedies, while sharing with comedy plots, titles, themes, characters, and happy endings. They feature a chorus of satyrs, with costumes that focus on the phallus, and use wordplay and sexual innuendos that do not occur in tragedy. The vast majority of satyr plays have been entirely lost: only one, by Euripides, survives complete.

==== Sophocles ====
No satyr play by Sophocles survives complete. Extensive fragments exist for one: Ichneutae.

==== Euripides ====
- Cyclops (424–408 BC)

=== Mimes ===
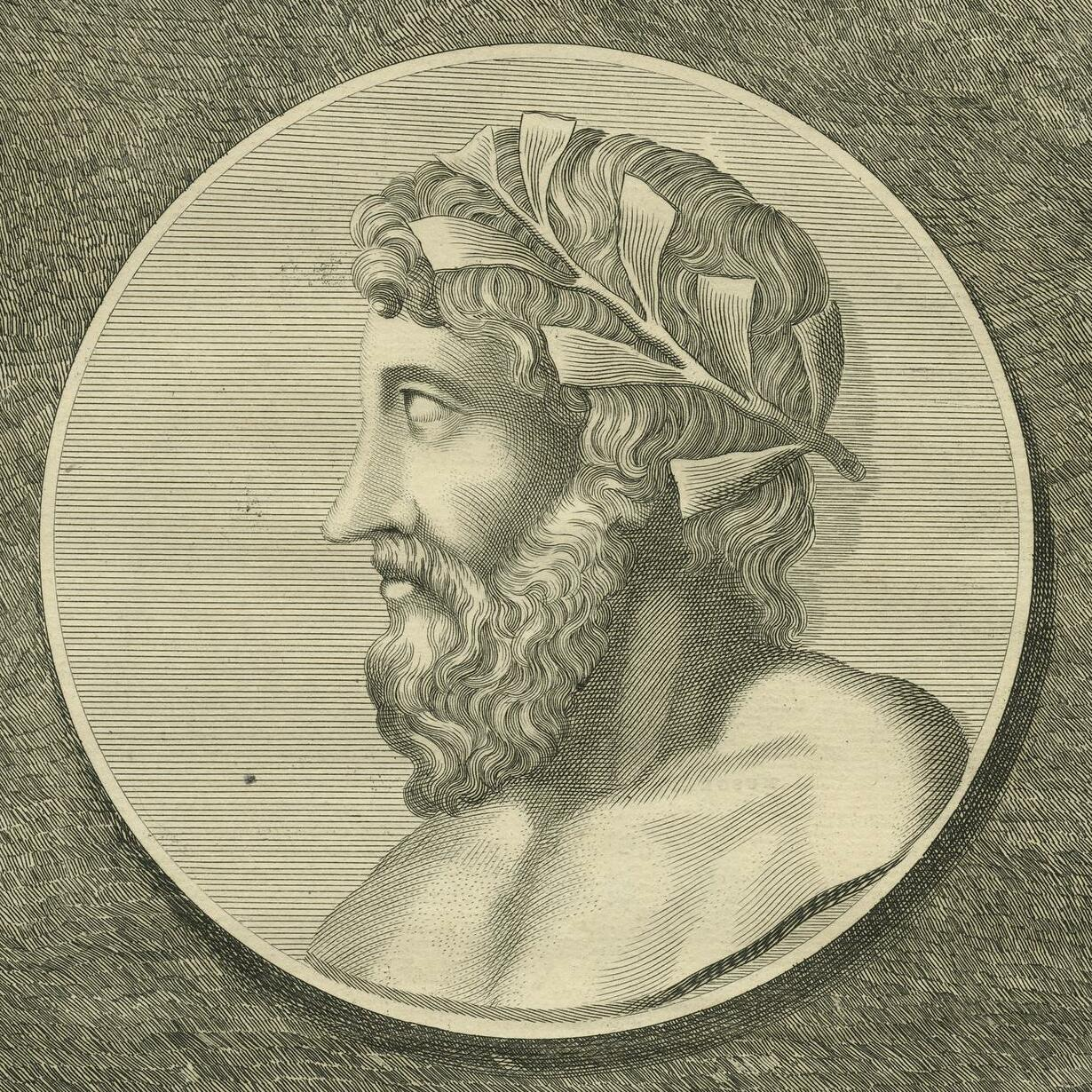
Theocritus

Mimes were a popular, informal type of entertainment in which a small group of actors portrayed a short situation from everyday life in the lower levels of society, in a humorous or farcical manner. It concentrated on depiction of character and physical humor instead of plot, and use of sexual innuendos and obscene jokes were frequent. There are eight surviving mimes attributed to Herodas, and three of Theocritus' idylls have been described as "urban mimes", although more of his work seems influenced by this literary genre.

==== Theocritus ====
- The Sorceresses (3rd century BC)
- The Love of Cynisca (3rd century BC)
- The Women at the Adonis-Festival (3rd century BC)

==== Herodas ====
- The Go-Between (3rd century BC)
- The Whoremonger (3rd century BC)
- The Schoolmaster (3rd century BC)
- The Woman Sacrificing to Asclepius (3rd century BC)
- The Jealous Woman (3rd century BC)
- The Gossiping Friends (3rd century BC)
- The Cobbler (3rd century BC)
- The Dream (3rd century BC)

==== Other ====
- Charition (2nd century) (based on Iphigenia in Tauris by Euripides, author unknown)
- Moicheutria (2nd century) (author unknown)

== Hellenistic Jewish ==
=== Tragedies ===
Drawing on the conventions established by the classical tragedians, Hellenistic Jews adapted sacred narratives to fit the structure of the Greek tragedy. A single example of this practice survives incomplete.

==== Ezekiel the Tragedian ====
- No play by Ezekiel the Tragedian survives complete. Extensive fragments exist for one: Exagoge (2nd century BC) (based on the Book of Exodus).

== Roman ==
=== Comedies ===
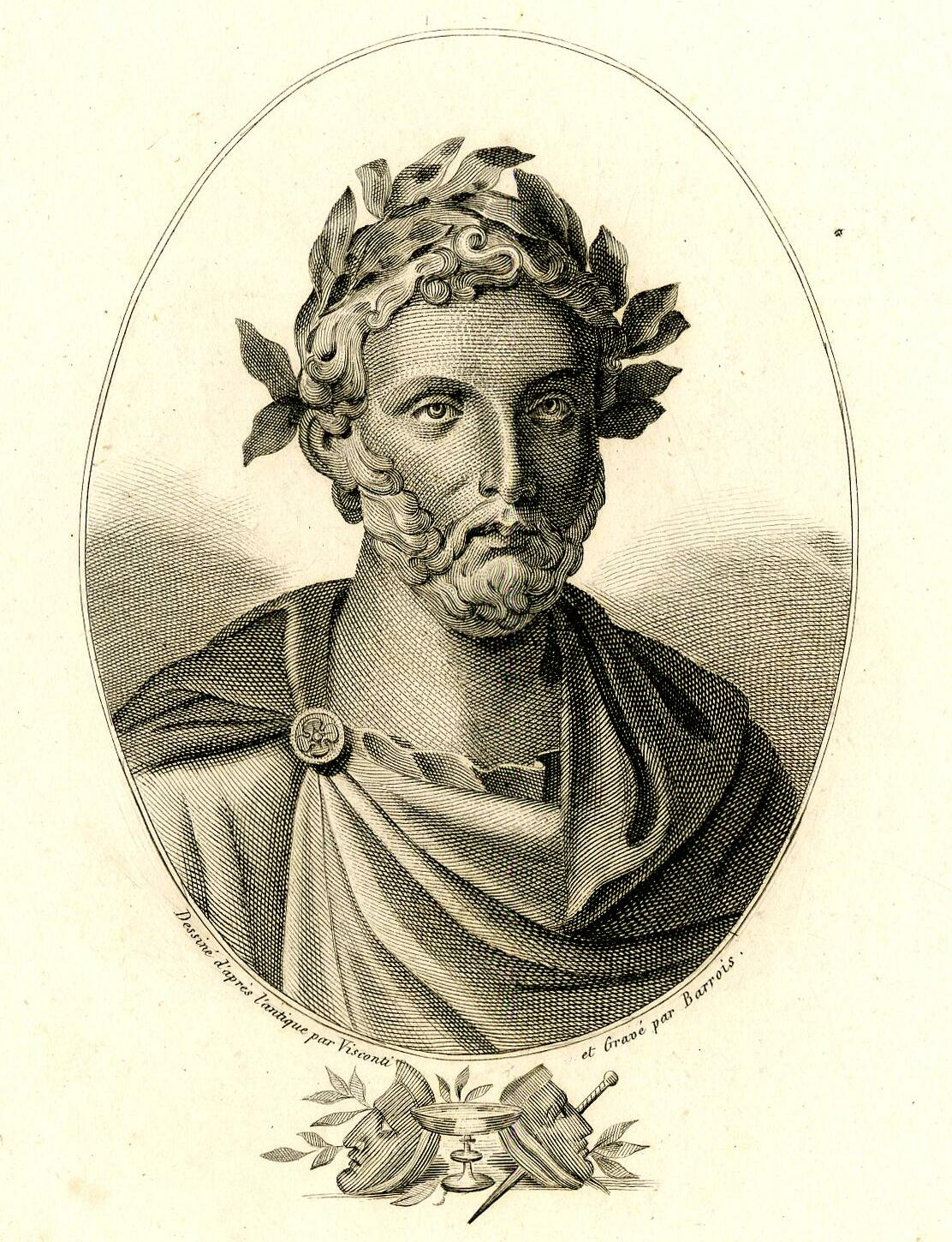
Plautus

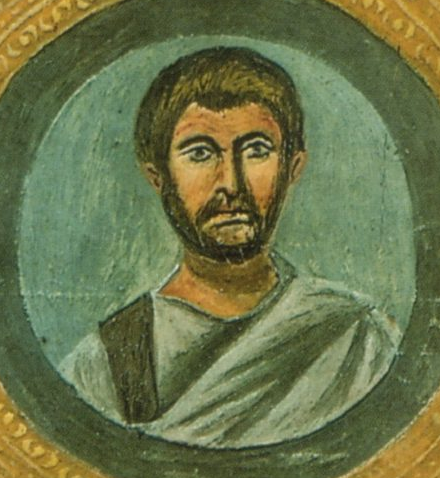
Terence

The ancient Roman comedies that have survived can be categorized as fabula palliata (comedies based on Greek subjects). Roman comic dramatists made several structural changes, such as the removal of the previously prominent role of the chorus as a means of separating the action into distinct episodes and the addition of musical accompaniment to the plays' dialogue. Action usually took place in the streets, and plot complications were often a result of eavesdropping by a minor character. It survives through the works of Plautus and Terence. Fabula togata (comedies based on Roman subjects) survives only in short fragments.

==== Plautus ====
- Asinaria (212–205 BC)
- Mercator (206 BC)
- Miles Gloriosus (206–204 BC)
- Cistellaria (201 BC)
- Captivi (200 BC)
- Rudens (200 BC)
- Stichus (200 BC)
- Epidicus (199–195 BC)
- Curculio (197–184 BC)
- Poenulus (195–189 BC)
- Trinummus (194 BC)
- Aulularia (194–190 BC)
- Menaechmi (194–186 BC)
- Bacchides (194–184 BC)
- Mostellaria (193 BC)
- Pseudolus (191 BC)
- Persa (191–184 BC)
- Amphitryon (190–185 BC)
- Casina (187–184 BC)
- Truculentus (186 BC)

==== Terence ====
- Andria (166 BC)
- Hecyra (165 BC)
- Heauton Timorumenos (163 BC)
- Eunuchus (161 BC)
- Phormio (161 BC)
- Adelphoe (160 BC)

==== Other ====
- Querolus (4th–5th century) (attributed to Plautus, true author unknown)

=== Tragedies ===
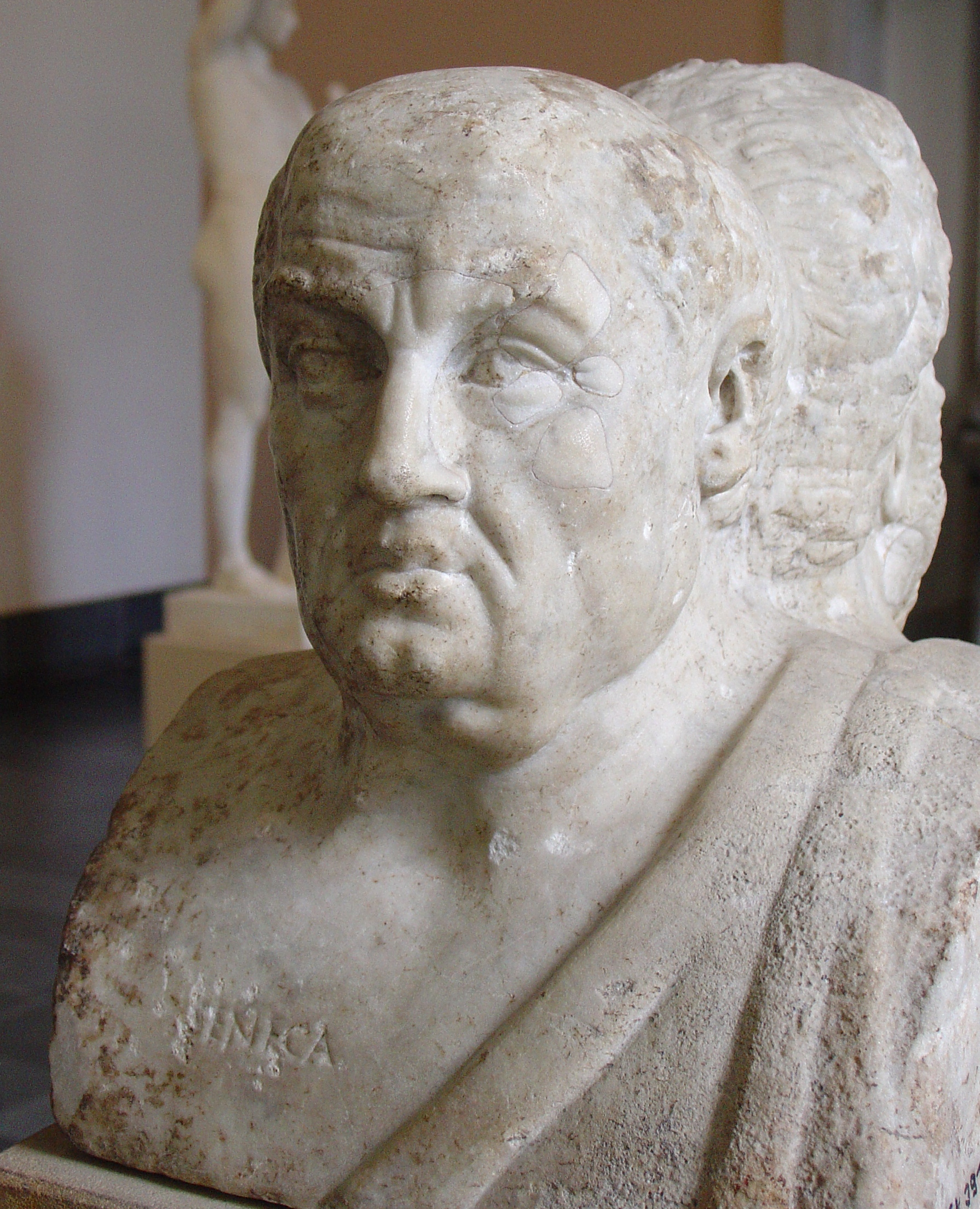
Seneca

Most surviving ancient Roman tragedies can be categorized as fabula crepidata (tragedy based on Greek subjects). Senecan tragedy specifically features a declamatory style, and most of his plays use exaggerations in order to make his points more persuasive. They explored the psychology of the mind through monologues, focusing on one's inner thoughts, the central causes of their emotional conflicts, dramatizing emotion in a way that became central to Roman tragedy. Besides Seneca's works, a single example of fabula praetexta (tragedy based on Roman subjects) survives.

==== Seneca ====
- Troades (40–65)
- Oedipus (40–65)
- Agamemnon (40–65)
- Medea (50)
- Phaedra (52)
- Thyestes (52)
- Hercules (54)
- Phoenissae (60–62) (unfinished)

==== Other ====
- Hercules Oetaeus (65–100) (attributed to Seneca, true author unknown)
- Octavia (65–100) (attributed to Seneca, true author unknown)
- Medea (2nd–3rd century) (Virgilian cento, attributed to Hosidius Geta)

== See also ==
- Theatre of ancient Greece
- Theatre of ancient Rome
- List of ancient Greek playwrights
