= Bacchides =

Bacchides may refer to:

- Bacchides (play), a Roman comedy by the playwright Plautus
- Bacchides (general), Hellenistic Greek general, ruler of country beyond Euphrates
- Bacchides (eunuch), attendant of Mithridates VI Eupator
