= Truculentus =

Ancient Roman play by Plautus

- Original language: Latin
- Written by: Plautus
- Characters: Diniarchus, an Athenian young man Astaphium, maid to Phronesium; Truculentus, slave of Strabax; Phronesium, a courtesan Stratophanes, a soldier Cyamus, servant of Diniarchus; Strabax, a young farmer Callicles, an Athenian gentleman maid, slave of Callicles; Syra, hairdresser of Phronesium attendants
- Genre: Roman comedy
- Setting: a street in Athens, before the houses of Phronesium and Strabax

Premiere
- Date: c. 186 BC
- Place: Rome?

Truculentus is a comedic Latin play by the early Roman playwright Titus Maccius Plautus. Following the relationships between prostitutes and their customers, it contains perhaps Plautus's most cynical depiction of human nature in comparison with his other surviving plays.

The title means "Truculent (or Surly)", referring to the bad-tempered slave who tries to prevent his young master Strabax from wasting money on his love affair with the courtesan Phronesium, but who later himself falls for the charms of her maid Astaphium.

According to Cicero, the Truculentus was written in Plautus's old age. De Melo argues in his edition that certain references (such as falsis de pugnis in line 486, a reference to a speech of Cato made in 190 BC, or Homeronida ("son of Homer") in line 485, a possible reference to a play by Ennius produced in 187 BC) make it probable that the play was produced in 186 BC.

== Plot ==
The play mostly revolves around the interactions between the courtesan Phronesium, her maid Astaphium, and three young men. Phronesium, the main prostitute, relentlessly persuades every male she encounters to give her all their money, by means of trickery or more often by simple flirtation. The three men are more than happy to comply with her wishes, although they complain frequently of their regrettable situation. They are essentially under her spell, and are completely unable or unwilling to do anything to break free from it. Her alluring outward façade masks her cold and greedy true nature.

Diniarchus, the young man most often at her house, has almost entirely lost his wealth to her by the play's beginning. By this point, he's all too familiar with who she really is and the games she plays. He even assists her with deceiving other men, but nonetheless continues to be her victim as well.

The main deception is played on the soldier Stratophanes. He had lived with Phronesium prior to the play's beginning, and before leaving the city had made many promises to her about what she'd have if they were to start a family together. Phronesium decides to borrow someone's baby and pretends she has just given birth to it, claiming when the soldier returns that it is his. He begins lavishing her with gifts; however, these are not enough for her insatiable appetite. She attempts to gain more by making him jealous, feigning excitement over the gifts of Diniarchus, and later pretending to be in love with a third man, Strabax, her rather dimwitted farming neighbor.

Throughout the play, Phronesium's maid Astaphium (who is more of a protégée to Phronesium than a maid) attempts to seduce the men as well. Almost as skilled in the art of seduction as her mentor, she works her feminine charms on several of them, and is even successful in charming the only one of them who resisted, Truculentus.

The slave from whom the play gets its name, Truculentus, attempts to protect his dimwitted master Strabax from wasting the family's fortune at the whorehouse. Although he puts up a good fight at first, some chinks in his armor are soon revealed as he can't help but stare at Astaphium during their encounter. Later he drops all opposition and joins the rest of the men in becoming completely helpless to their control.

The play is brought to a close when a gentleman called Callicles arrives, looking for the baby his daughter had as a result of being raped. Pointed out by Callicles' maid, Diniarchus confesses that he is the father. He agrees to a shotgun wedding with the mother, and goes to get the baby back from Phronesium. However, Phronesium gets her way as always and keeps the baby until she decides she no longer needs it. Diniarchus, as well as the other men, have learned nothing by the play's end.

== Metrical scheme ==
The five acts into which Plautus's plays are traditionally divided are believed to date from Renaissance times and do not go back to Plautus himself. However, the metrical schemes of the plays often indicate how they can be divided into different sections. A common pattern is for a section to begin with iambic senarii, then a passage or passages in other metres, rounded off by a passage in trochaic septenarii. Timothy Moore calls this the "ABC succession". It appears that the "A" sections (iambic senarii) were unaccompanied, the others sung or recited to the music of a pair of pipes known as tībiae.

According to this scheme, the play Truculentus can be divided into five metrical sections, which correspond roughly but not exactly to the traditional acts. There is a symmetrical pattern, with the first and fifth sections about Diniarchus, the second and fourth about Strabax and his slave Truculentus, while the middle section is about the tricking of Stratophanes.

Although the music which accompanied the words is now lost, it is clear that the different metres had different qualities. For example, iambic septenarii are often associated with courtesans. In this play the majority of the 95 iambic septenarii lines are sung by Astaphium, and the remainder by Diniarchus in conversation with her.

The overall scheme, taking A = iambic senarii, B = other metres, C = trochaic septenarii, is as follows:

ABBBBB(A)C, BABC, ABBC, BAC, BC

As frequently occurs in Plautus's comedies, the third of the five sections is taken up with a trick carried out to obtain money. In this play the trickster is Phronesium, who dresses up in maternity clothes and uses a baby as a prop in order to deceive the soldier Stratophanes.

=== Diniarchus's troubles ===
- Prologue; Act 1.1 (lines 1–94): iambic senarii (21 lines + c.76 lines)

The actor reciting the Prologue explains that the scene is set in Athens, in front of the house of the courtesan Phronesium, who is pretending to a certain soldier that she has had a baby by him.
The young man Diniarchus enters and complains to the audience how expensive it is to keep a courtesan supplied with presents. He reveals that he has just returned from the island of Lemnos.

- Act 1.2 (95–129): polymetric song (35 lines)

Phronesium's maid Astaphium comes out, telling the servants to guard the mistress's property carefully. Diniarchus calls to her.

- Act 1.2 (cont.) (130–208): iambic septenarii (80 lines)

Astaphium pretends to Diniarchus that she is going to fetch the midwife. Diniarchus says he knows she is lying, since he has just overheard her saying she is going to fetch a "him" not a "her"; he is curious to know who it is. Astaphium avoids answering and says Phronesium will be delighted to see him after his journey. But she also tells him that Phronesium has given birth to the soldier's baby. Diniarchus goes inside.

- Act 2.1 (209–212): polymetric song (4 lines)

Left alone, Astaphium laughs at having tricked Diniarchus, whom she doesn't like.

- Act 2.1 (cont.) (213–216): iambic octonarii (4 lines)

She explains that Diniarchus is now more of a friend to Phronesium than a lover.

- Act 2.1 (cont.) (217–223): iambic septenarii (7 lines)

He has already made over all his property to Phronesium and has nothing left.

- Act 2.1 (cont.) (224–227): iambic senarii (?4 lines)

She says a courtesan has to be clever at getting presents.

- Act 2.1 (cont.): (228–235): trochaic septenarii (8 lines)

When a lover has nothing left to give, she must discard him.

=== Astaphium visits Strabax ===
- Act 2.1 (cont.): (237–240): iambic septenarii (4 lines)

Astaphium says that no one lover can ever give enough.

- Act 2.1 (cont.) (241–247, 250): iambic senarii (8 lines)

She says that courtesans must therefore always look out for new lovers, such as the young farmer who lives next door, who the previous night had climbed over the garden wall to visit Phronesium without his father knowing.

- Act 2.1 (cont.) (251–255): iambic septenarii (4 lines)

But she complains about the bad-tempered slave who keeps chasing her away.

- Act 2.2 (256–321): trochaic septenarii (66 lines)

Astaphium knocks on Strabax's door, but the servant Truculentus comes out and rudely refuses her entry. He declares he is going to the market to inform Strabax's father about his son's comings and goings.

=== Phronesium tricks Stratophanes ===
- Act 2.3–2.4 (322–447): iambic senarii (126 lines)

Diniarchus complains that Phronesium is taking a very long time bathing. He asks Astaphium to go inside and inform Phronesium that he is waiting. Phronesium now comes out and invites Diniarchus to have something to eat now that he has returned from his journey. When the servants have gone inside, she discloses to Diniarchus that the baby is not really hers but that she is just pretending in order to trap the soldier. After teasing him with a kiss she asks him for a present, which he willingly promises to send to her. After she goes inside, he speaks of his love for her, then departs.

- Act 2.5: (448–464): anapaestic (7 lines), bacchiac (10 lines)

Phronesium comes out, dressed in maternity clothes. She sings about her anxiety about the trick she is performing, which she hopes will go well.

- Act 2.5 (cont.)–2.6 (465–550): trochaic septenarii (85 lines)

She explains to the audience that for a woman it is much easier to be bad than good. Then she orders the servants to prepare a sacrifice to Lucina (the goddess of childbirth) on the nearby altar, and to bring a couch, which she lies down on.
The "Babylonian" soldier, Stratophanes, now arrives with some attendants, after a ten-month absence. He declares that unlike most soldiers he doesn't believe in boasting. Astaphium greets him, while Phronesium pretends to be exhausted from giving birth. Stratophanes presents Phronesium with two Syrian slave girls and some clothes, but she doesn't seem very pleased with the gifts.

=== Strabax is victorious ===
- Act 2.7 (551–630): polymetric song (bacchiac, anapaestic, aeolics, iambic-trochaic, cretic) (80 lines)

Diniarchus's servant Cyamus (or Geta) now arrives with several slaves carrying gifts. He complains about how his master is wasting all his property on his love affair with Phronesium. Phronesium is delighted with the presents and bids the servant to tell his master that he is welcome to visit. Stratophanes, observing this, becomes mad with jealousy and speaks disparagingly of Diniarchus and starts quarrelling with Cyamus.

- Act 2.8–Act 3.2 (631–698): iambic senarii (67 lines)

Phronesium goes inside, and shuts the door against Stratophanes, who goes away angrily. The young farmer Strabax now enters, carrying some money that he says he received while he was away at the farm from a man who owed it to his father. Phronesium comes out and welcomes him inside. Now Truculentus appears, surprised that Strabax has not yet returned from the farm. He meets Astaphium, who teases him and explains that Strabax is inside with Phronesium. She invites him inside.

- Act 4.1 (699–710): trochaic septenarii (12 lines)

Diniarchus arrives, very pleased that his gifts have been acceptable. He decides to keep watch outside the door for a while.

=== Diniarchus learns the truth ===
- Act 4.2 (711–729): polymetric song (anapaests, bacchiac, iambic-trochaic) (19 lines)

Astaphium comes out, telling her mistress that she will keep guard on the door. She meets Diniarchus and explains that Phronesium is busy with Strabax at that moment.

- Act 4.2 (cont.)–Act 5 (730–967): trochaic septenarii (239 lines)

Diniarchus pleads with her but she tells him to go away and goes back inside. Left alone, Diniarchus complains about Phronesium's behaviour. Suddenly an older gentleman, Callicles, approaches bringing two female slaves whose hands are tied. With savage threats, Callicles demands that the slaves tell him the truth. After being interrogated one of the girls confesses that Callicles' unmarried daughter had had a baby, and that the baby had been given to Phronesium. The other girl reveals that the father of the baby is none other than Diniarchus, who was formerly betrothed to Callicles' daughter. Diniarchus begs Callicles for forgiveness, and he offers to marry Callicles' daughter. Callicles grudgingly agrees, but says he will give her away with a much reduced dowry. He releases the girls and departs. When Phronesium comes out, Diniarchus asks her to give up the child. But she begs him to let her keep it a few days longer, so that she can continue to trick the soldier into giving her more money.
In the final scene Stratophanes appears and gives Phronesium a pound of gold. She accepts the gift but reacts coldly, saying that the baby requires a lot of expenses. At this point Stratophanes is outraged to see the young farmer Strabax coming out from Phronesium's house. The two men argue and nearly come to blows. Stratophanes gives Phronesium an additional talent of silver, but it still isn't enough, and she bids Strabax go inside while the soldier must wait his turn.

== Translations ==
- Henry Thomas Riley, 1912: full text
- Paul Nixon, 1916–38
- George E. Duckworth, 1942
- James Tatum, 1983
- David M. Christenson, 2010
- Wolfang de Melo, 2013
