= Epidicus =

Ancient Roman comedy by Plautus

- Written by: Plautus
- Characters: Epidicus (slave to Periphanes); Thesprio; Stratippocles; Chaerobulus; Periphanes; Apoecides; A soldier Philippa; A music girl Acropolistis; A money-lender Telestis
- Original language: Latin
- Genre: Roman comedy
- Setting: Athens

Premiere
- Date premiered: late 3rd century BC
- Place premiered: Rome?

Epidicus is an ancient Roman comedy written by Plautus in the 3rd or 2nd century BC. It is said to have been one of Plautus's favorite works. Epidicus is the name of the main character, who is a slave. The plot takes many turns as Epidicus tries to please his master's son, Stratippocles.

The main plot was based upon a Greek play. However, the storyline was changed in order to prevent a brother from marrying his half-sister. The Romans considered this incest, which deeply disturbed them; the Greeks, however, were not bothered by this.

The pronunciation of "Epidicus" is with four short vowels.

== Characters ==
- Epidicus – slave to Periphanes.
- Thesprio – another slave, armour bearer of Stratippocles.
- Stratippocles – a young Athenian, son of Periphanes; he is summoned to war in Thebes between the Athenians and Thebans. Has his slave, Epidicus, purchase a slave girl, Acropolistis, after he leaves for war. Once in Thebes, however, he falls in love with another girl, Telestis, whom he purchases on borrowed money.
- Chaeribulus – agemate and friend of Stratippocles
- Periphanes – a widowed Athenian gentleman who has an unmarried son, Stratippocles. He had a relationship with a Theban woman, Philippa and had an illegitimate daughter, Telestis, who lives with her mother in Thebes.
- Apoecides – a neighbour and friend of Periphanes
- Soldier – a wealthy young soldier who is in love with Acropolistis and wishes to purchase her
- Philippa – a woman formerly seduced by Periphanes. A woman of Thebes who has an illegitimate daughter, Telestis.
- Acropolistis – a music girl; the first girl that Stratippocles falls in love with; plays as if she is Periphanes' daughter
- Music girl – another music girl, who is hired temporarily by Epidicus to help with his trick.
- Money-lender – lends Stratippocles the money to purchase Telestis
- Telestis – illegitimate daughter of Periphanes and Philippa who is captured in the war.

== Plot ==
Epidicus is a slave who looks only to please those he serves. Stratippocles, the son of Epidicus' master Periphanes, has fallen in love with Acropolistis, a female slave. While Stratippocles is away in Thebes fighting in a war, he orders Epidicus to find the money to buy her. Epidicus tricks Periphanes into purchasing Acropolistis by convincing him that this girl is Periphanes' daughter Telestis, born out of wedlock with a woman named Philippa. Periphanes hasn't seen Telestis in many years, and Epidicus tells him that she was captured in Thebes and brought to Athens. Believing this young woman is his daughter, Periphanes willingly hands over the money.

The play starts when Stratippocles returns from the war, having lost his shield (the act of a coward), and bringing a captive girl he has fallen in love with. Stratippocles has borrowed forty minae from a money-lender to purchase this new girl. When Epidicus tells him that while he was away he has carried out his wishes and purchased the girl as instructed, Stratippocles callously informs him he has wasted his time since he is now in love with someone else. Since his friend Chaeribulus refuses to help him, Stratippocles orders Epidicus to find the money that same day, threatening to severely punish him if he does not succeed. Meanwhile, preferring not to meet his father, he stays in Chaeribulus's house.

In order to convince Periphanes to give him more money, Epidicus tells him that Stratippocles is about to purchase a music-girl in order to marry her. Epidicus urges Periphanes to purchase the girl before Stratippocles can, so that the marriage can be avoided; he adds that he can then sell the girl to a certain soldier who loves her and make a profit. Periphanes agrees to give his slave the money. Once the money is received, Epidicus gives it to Stratippocles. Epidicus then hires a different music-girl to act as if she were Stratippocles' girlfriend and brings her to Periphanes' house.

The soldier who is enamored with Acropolistis comes to Periphanes' home in hopes of convincing Periphanes to allow him to purchase her. However, when the hired music girl is brought out, he realizes that the she is not Acropolistis, and he refuses to buy her. Shortly afterwards, Philippa, Telestis's mother, shows up at Periphanes' home looking for her daughter, since she heard she was brought to Athens as a captive. Periphanes assures Philippa that their daughter, Telestis, is safe inside. When the girl he thinks is Telestis is presented to Philippa, she instantly knows it is not her daughter. Epidicus is about to be severely punished because of his double deceit.

At this moment, however, the captive that Stratippocles purchased while away is brought to him by the money lender. While Stratippocles goes inside to fetch the money, Epidicus recognizes her to be Periphanes' daughter, Telestis. Overwhelmed and confused, Periphanes finally meets his daughter for the first time. Stratippocles, upset about the "loss" of his love due to her being his half-sister, is comforted by Acropolistis, the original slave girl whom Epidicus purchased. Epidicus is quickly forgiven for his trickery, and is freed from slavery for his help in reuniting a father and daughter.

== Metrical structure ==
Plautus's plays are traditionally divided into five acts; these are referred to below for convenience, since many editions make use of them. However, it is not thought that they go back to Plautus's time, since no manuscript contains them before the 15th century. Also, the acts themselves do not always match the structure of the plays, which is often more clearly shown by the variation in metres.

From a metrical point of view, Plautus's plays are generally made up of (A) iambic senarii (unaccompanied), (B) songs in various metres, and (C) trochaic septenarii (sung or recited to music), usually in that order. Epidicus is slightly different, however, since the first three sections have no iambic senarii, but begin directly with music:

BC, BC, BBC, ABB, ABC

The fourth section, instead of the usual trochaic septenarii, ends with 41 lines of iambic septenarii, a metre sometimes called the "laughing metre", appropriate for moments of gleeful emotion. Another unusual feature is the 7 lines of the lyrical wilamowitzianus metre (533–536), used where Philippa and Periphanes see each other for the first time in many years.

=== Epidicus hears troubling news ===
- Act 1.1 (1-79): mixed metres (tr7, ia-tr, ia8) (79 lines)

The slave Epidicus catches up with his master's armour-bearer, Thesprio, in the street, having chased after him from the port. Thesprio tells him that their young master Stratippocles has lost his armour in the battle, but has borrowed 40 minae to buy a certain female captive. This news alarms Epidicus, since before Stratippocles went away he had ordered Epidicus to purchase a certain music-girl, and Epidicus had done this by tricking Stratippocles' father into thinking that the girl was his long-lost daughter.

- Act 1.1 (cont.) (80–84): trochaic septenarii (5 lines)

Thesprio departs. Epidicus realises he's in trouble.

=== Epidicus is ordered to find some money ===
- Act 1.1 (cont.) (85–98): cretics mixed with trochaic septenarii (14 lines)

Epidicus sings ruefully of the punishment he will undoubtedly receive.

- Act 1.1 (cont.) (99-165): trochaic septenarii (65 lines) + ia8 (2 lines)

Epidicus tells himself not to worry. He sees Stratippocles approaching with his friend Chaeribulus. Stratippocles asks Chaeribulus to lend him the money to pay for the girl, but Chaeribulus says he is already in debt and he refuses. Stratippocles says he will get Epidicus to find the cash, or else he will punish him. When Epidicus greets him and tells him how he has purchased the other girl as instructed, Stratippocles says Epidicus has wasted his time, since he now loves a different girl. He demands that Epidicus find the required 40 minae before sunset. Epidicus tells him that there is a certain wealthy soldier who may be interested in buying the first girl. Stratippocles and Chaeribulus go into Chaeribulus's house. Epidicus hesitates a moment then decides to go and tell Stratippocles to keep out of sight of his father.

=== Epidicus tricks Periphanes ===
- Act 1.2 (cont.)–2.2 (166-178): mostly cretic (13 lines)

Stratippocles' father Periphanes comes out onto the street with his friend Apoecides. Apoecides is trying unsuccessfully to persuade the widowed Periphanes to consider remarrying.

- Act 1.2 (cont.)–2.2 (179-195): mostly iambic (ia8, ia4, tr7) (17 lines)

They move on to the topic of Stratippocles' getting married. Since Periphanes has heard that he is still in love with a music girl, he welcomes the idea. Overhearing them, Epidicus boasts that he is certainly going to fleece the old man.

- Act 2.2 (196-305): trochaic septenarii (110 lines)

Running up as if arriving with news, he tells Periphanes that the soldiers are returning from the war, and that in the crowd he had overheard some courtesans saying that Stratippocles had managed to borrow some money to buy the freedom of his music-girl mistress. To prevent this he suggests to Periphanes that he himself should buy the girl, using Apoecides as an intermediary, and sell her to a certain soldier who is keen to buy her. Periphanes falls for the plan.

=== Epidicus gives the money to Stratippocles ===
- Act 2.3 (306-319): iambic senarii (14 lines)

When they have gone, Epidicus boasts how easy it is to cheat Periphanes. Periphanes has even ordered a music girl to be hired for a sacrifice, so the same girl will do for Epidicus's trick.

- Act 3.1–3.2 (320-340): mixed metres (cr, ia-tr, aeolics) (21 lines)

Stratippocles and Chaeribulus come out from Chaeribulus's house. Stratippocles is anxious to know whether Epidicus has managed to find the money, and he chides Chaeribulus for being so unhelpful.

- Act 3.1–3.2 (341-381): iambic septenarii (41 lines)

Epidicus now comes out from Periphanes's house with a bag of money, boasting of his good fortune. He sees Stratippocles and gives him the money. He tells Stratippocles about his plan to hire a different music girl, and to pretend that she is Stratippocles' mistress. And he will get the slave-dealer to swear to Apoecides that the money has already been paid for the music girl.

=== Epidicus escapes punishment ===
- Act 3.3–3.4 (382-525): iambic senarii (144 lines)

Periphanes comes from his house congratulating himself on his success. He meets his friend Apoecides, who is bringing a music girl, under the illusion that she is Stratippocles' mistress. He tells Periphanes that the girl doesn't know that she has been purchased by Periphanes, but thinks she has been hired to play at a sacrifice in Periphanes' house. Periphanes orders for her to be taken inside but not allowed to meet the other girl, who he imagines is his daughter.

A soldier now arrives, looking for Periphanes. When he finds him, he says he wishes to purchase the music-girl, and Periphanes offers to sell her for 60 minae. But when the girl is brought outside, the soldier declares that this is not the Acropolistis he is in love with. He informs Periphanes that his servant has obviously cheated him. The music-girl also informs him that she is not a slave and that she was hired for a sacrifice. She adds that the other girl, Acropolistis, was freed recently on the instructions of Stratippocles. Periphanes is furious that he and Apoecides have been made fools of by Epidicus.

- Act 4.1 (526-546): mixed metres (tr8, ba, ia8, wil, an, cr, tr) (21 lines)

A woman (Philippa) arrives, looking for Periphanes. Periphanes isn't sure but thinks he recognises her as the women he once raped in Epidaurus.

- Act 4.1 (cont.)–5.2 (547-733): trochaic septenarii (187 lines)

They greet each other, and she tells him her daughter was made a captive in the recent war. Periphanes reassures her that her daughter is safe in the house. He brings Acropolistis outside, but of course Philippa does not recognise her. He is furious to realise that he has been tricked by Epidicus yet again. He sends the women indoors and goes to look for Epidicus.

Stratippocles meets Epidicus, who tells him he fears he is about to be severely punished. The money lender now arrives, bringing the captive girl. While Stratippocles goes inside to fetch the money owed, Epidicus suddenly recognises the girl as Philippa's daughter Telestis; he had once been sent to bring her a present on her birthday. Stratippocles is surprised to find that his girlfriend is now his sister; but Epidicus tells him the music girl he loved formerly is still waiting for him.

Periphanes and Apoecides now appear, determined to punish Epidicus. But he shows no fear and freely confesses to all his crimes. Then he tells Periphanes that he has found his daughter. Periphanes, after going to check, is so delighted that he grants Epidicus his freedom and a reward of money in addition.
