= Bacchides (play) =

Ancient Roman play by Plautus

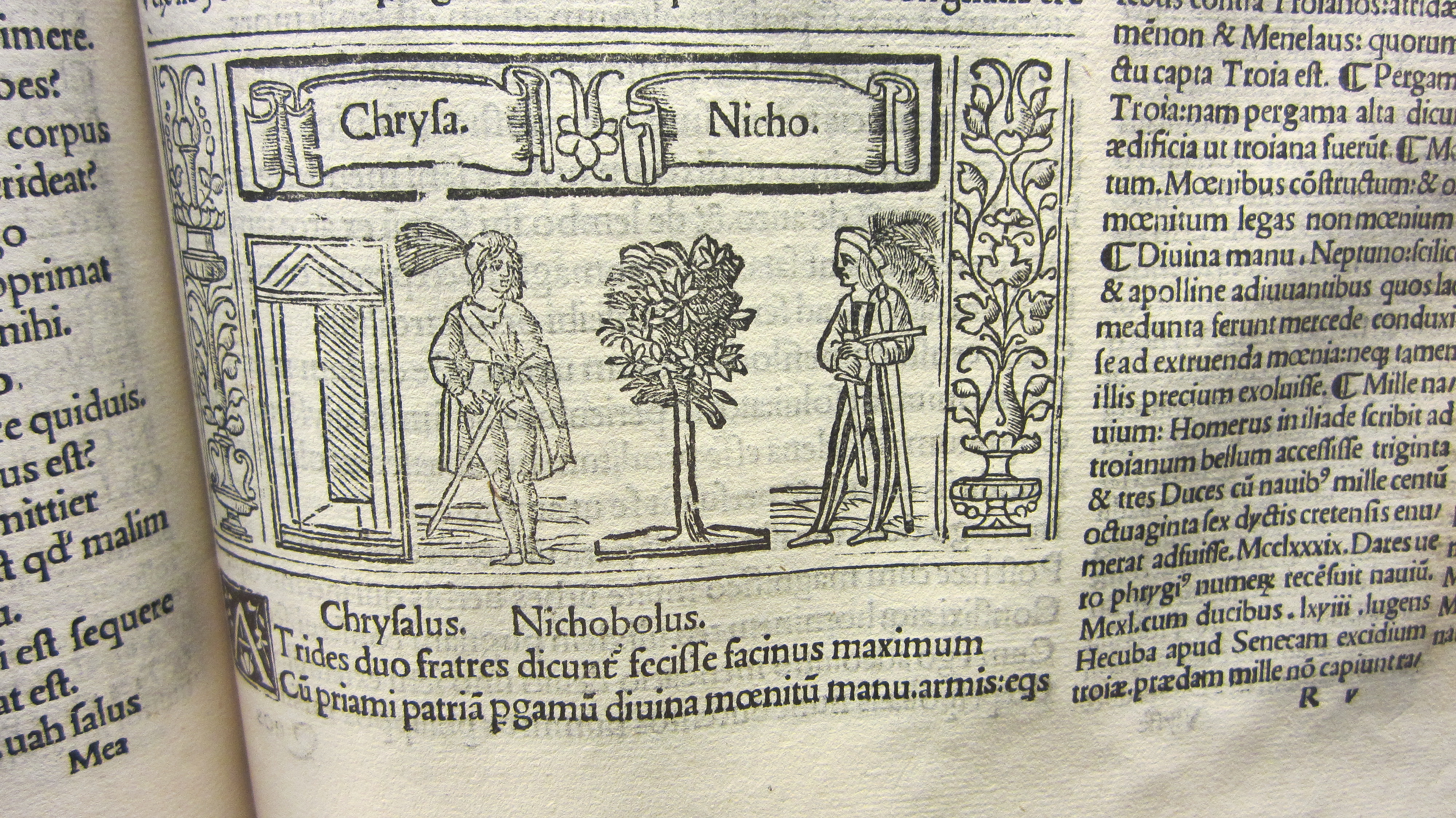
- Chrysalus and Nicobulus (from a 1511 edition)
- Original language: Latin
- Written by: Plautus
- Based on: Dis Exapaton by Menander
- Characters: Bacchis I (a prostitute); Slave (of Bacchis); Pistoclerus (son of Philoxenus); Boy (of Cleomachus); Bacchis II (sister of Bacchis I); Lydus (tutor to Pistoclerus); Chrysalus (slave of Nicobulus); Nicobulus (old man); Mnesilochus (son of Nicobulus); Philoxenus; Parasite (of Cleomachus); Artamo (slave of Nicobulus); Cleomachus (soldier)
- Genre: Roman comedy
- Setting: Athens

Bacchides is a Latin comedy by the early Roman playwright Titus Maccius Plautus. The title has been translated as The Bacchises, and the plot revolves around the misunderstandings surrounding two sisters, each called Bacchis, who work in a brothel. It includes Plautus' frequent theme of a clever servant outwitting his supposed superior to get money.

The play is probably an adaptation of the play Δὶς Ἐξαπατῶν (Dis Exapaton), meaning Twice Deceiving or The Double Deceiver, by the Greek playwright Menander. The beginning of it is lost, but the outline of the missing scenes can be partly reconstructed from twenty surviving fragments.

One feature of the play which has puzzled scholars is that while Menander's original play was called "The Twice Deceiving", there appear to be three deceptions in the Bacchides. Various solutions to this have been suggested. Several scholars have proposed that the third deception was added by Plautus himself and was not in the original Menander play.

Because of the variety of musical passages, the Bacchides is believed to have been written late in Plautus's career, either before or after the Pseudolus.

The play is set in Athens. The stage set shows two houses, that of Bacchis and that of Nicobulus. Between them is a shrine or altar of Apollo.

== Plot summary ==
While the young man Mnesilochus is abroad in Ephesus, collecting a debt on behalf of his father, he falls in love with a courtesan called Bacchis. But Bacchis is taken against her will to Athens by a soldier who has hired her services. His friend Pistoclerus, who has been instructed to look for Bacchis in Athens, falls in love with Bacchis's twin sister, also called Bacchis.

When Mnesilochus and his cunning slave Chrysalus return home, Chrysalus deceives Mnesilochus's father Nicobulus into thinking that part of the money is still in Ephesus; in this way Mnesilochus will be able to keep some of the money to pay for Bacchis's release from her contract with the soldier. But when by chance Mnesilochus hears that Pistoclerus has acquired a girlfriend called Bacchis, in his anger he gives all the money to his father, keeping none back. Too late, he learns from Pistoclerus that there are two Bacchides. He begs Chrysalus to play another trick on his father to get the money he needs. Chrysalus therefore tells Nicobulus that Mnesilochus has been making love to the wife of a soldier called Cleomachus who is threatening to kill Mnesilochus. To protect his son, Nicobulus willingly promises to pay the money.

Later, in yet another deception, Chrysalus persuades Nicobulus to pay another 200 gold pieces to prevent his son committing perjury. Shortly afterwards Nicobulus meets the soldier and learns that Bacchis is only a courtesan who owed the soldier money. Furious, Nicobulus and Pistoclerus's father Philoxenus go to the Bacchis sisters' house to confront their sons; the two sisters come out, tease them and charm them and persuade them to come in and enjoy the party.

== Metrical structure ==
Plautus's plays are traditionally divided into five acts. However, it is not thought that the act-divisions go back to Plautus's time, since no manuscript contains them before the 15th century. Also, the acts themselves do not always match the structure of the plays, which is often more clearly shown by the variation in metres.

A common pattern in Plautus is for a metrical section to begin with iambic senarii (which were unaccompanied by music), followed optionally by a musical passage or song, and ending with trochaic septenarii, which were recited or sung to the music of a pair of pipes known as tibiae. This pattern is referred to as the "ABC succession", where A = iambic senarii, B = other metres, and C = trochaic septenarii. Some of Plautus's plays, however, begin with song (for example, Persa and Cistellaria).

The Bacchides is notable for the variety of its musical passages. These include a polymetric song (612–669), in which Mnesilochus blames himself bitterly for losing his temper. This song has several changes of metre (trochaic, anapaestic, bacchiac, cretic) and includes a passage of 12 lines of the rarely found wilamowitzianus (626–631a). Later in the play there is a long passage of iambic octonarii, mixed with trochaic octonarii and septenarii, in which Chrysalus celebrates his triumph (925–996a); and there are also passages of cretics (1107–1116) and bacchiacs (1120–1140a), and two long passages in anapaestic metres (1076–1108 and 1149–1211).

If the trochaic septenarii passages are taken as indicating the end of each metrical section, the play can be analysed metrically as follows:

(AB)C, AC, AC, ABC, ABABBC, BBC

Clark (1976) analyses the play as having a symmetrical structure, centring around the intervention of the soldier's parasite in 573–611. The events in the first half are echoed in reverse order in the second half. He sees a structure such as the following (omitting the first two scenes):

- The Bacchises seduce Pistoclerus

- Chrysalus tricks Nicobulus

- Mnesilochus is angry

- The parasite demands Bacchis's return

- Mnesilochus is distressed

- Chrysalus tricks Nicobulus

- The Bacchises seduce the old men

Clark points out various verbal echoes between the corresponding scenes: for example, in sections 1 and 7, Pistoclerus and his father both compare the girls' sweet talk to bird-lime (viscus), used to trap birds (50, 1158); in sections 2 and 6, Nicobulus talks of the necessity of sailing to Ephesus (342–3, 775–6); and both Lydus (372) and Cleomachus (869) use the word sorbeo of sucking blood.

Similar symmetrical or chiastic structures can be found in other Plautus plays, such as Asinaria, Miles Gloriosus, Captivi, and Pseudolus.

The first two or three scenes of the Bacchides (perhaps 200 lines) are missing in the manuscripts of the P family, presumably because they all derive ultimately from an ancient copy which was damaged; they are also missing in the Ambrosian palimpsest (A), which in this play begins only at line 476. Some 20 short fragments quoted by ancient writers are thought to belong in this gap: these are numbered lines 1–31 in the Oxford text. Some of the fragments are in metres suitable for song (cretic, bacchiac, and one iambic octonarius), while others are in iambic senarii. The order of the fragments differs in different editions and is not entirely certain. However, it is most likely that, like most of Plautus's plays, Bacchides began with the spoken iambic senarii verse. The reconstruction given below is based on the arguments of Bader.

=== The Bacchises seduce Pistoclerus ===
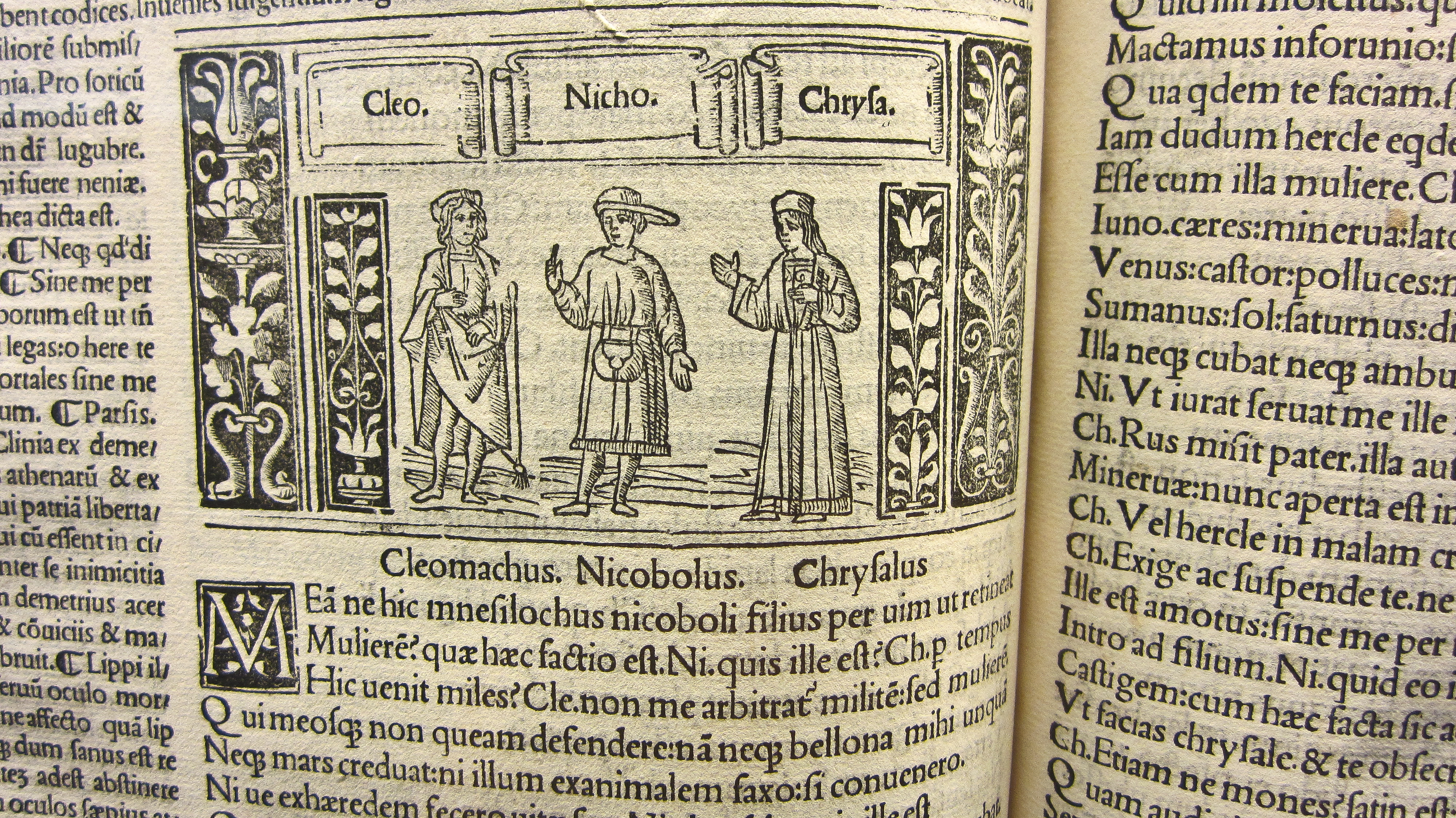
1511 edition, depicting Cleomachus, Nicobulus and Chrysalus

- Fragments: iambic senarii

The Athenian Bacchis orders her servants to sweep the house in preparation for her sister's arrival... In a delayed prologue, the young man Pistoclerus, comparing his wanderings throughout the city to those of Ulysses, explains the situation to the audience, probably mentioning the letter he has received from his friend Mnesilochus begging him to find the other Bacchis, and describing the soldier who has hired her...

- Fragments: iambic octonarius, cretic, bacchiac, iambic senarii

The sister arrives, accompanied by a slave boy sent by the soldier who has hired her for a year. The slave boy sings of the behaviour expected of a good slave (ia8) and the punishments of a bad one. He describes the fierce character of the soldier (ba4). He reminds Bacchis's sister of the terms of the contract: she is not to sleep with anyone else during the time of the contract (ia6)... When Pistoclerus sees Bacchis, he realises that this is the woman that he and Mnesilochus are seeking (cr)...

- Act 1.1 (35–108): trochaic septenarii (74 lines)

Bacchis and her sister discuss who is to speak. Eventually Bacchis tells Pistoclerus (who is standing nearby) that her sister is afraid that the soldier who has hired her services may enslave her and not allow her to return home at the end of her contract. She wishes that she had the money so that she could pay him to release her. Bacchis says she wants Pistoclerus to be present when the soldier arrives, and that she will give him a kiss if he does so. Pistoclerus at first is reluctant, fearing that Bacchis may seduce him and cause him a lot of expense, but eventually she wins him over. She sends him to the market to buy food for her sister's homecoming feast. When he has gone, Bacchis urges her sister to go and bathe after her long journey.

=== Chrysalus's first trick ===
- Act 1.2–2.3 (109–367): iambic senarii (259 lines)

Pistoclerus comes back from the market with a cook and some attendants carrying provisions. He is accompanied by Lydus, his paedagogus (a servant instructed to watch over children), who questions him disapprovingly. Pistoclerus ignores Lydus's calls to return home, and enters Bacchis's house; Lydus follows him.

Chrysalus, a slave of Pistoclerus's friend Mnesilochus, now enters. He tells the audience that he is returning home after a two-year absence. He salutes the shrine of Apollo in the centre of the stage and prays that he can find Pistoclerus before being spotted by Mnesilochus's father Nicobulus. Suddenly he sees Pistoclerus coming out of Bacchis's house. He informs Pistoclerus that Mnesilochus has returned and is anxious to know if Pistoclerus has been able to find his beloved, Bacchis, as he had requested. Pistoclerus assures him that he has found her. He says that Bacchis is still madly in love with Mnesilochus, but adds that a certain soldier has hired her and is demanding money to release her from her contract. Chrysalus tells him not to worry and that he will find the money. When Pistoclerus has gone back inside Chrysalus tells the audience that he and Mnesilochus have brought with them from Ephesus 1200 gold philippic coins which were a repayment of a loan Nicobulus had made earlier to a business partner in Ephesus.

Mnesilochus's father Nicobulus now comes out of his house. Meeting him, Chrysalus tells him a long invented story of how his friend in Ephesus was very reluctant to repay the loan and had to be forced to do so. Then, when they were leaving the harbour, they saw another ship which they suspected of being a pirate ship leaving at the same time; so they returned to harbour and deposited the gold in the temple of Diana for safety. For this reason, Mnesilochus, he says, managed to bring only a part of the gold; Nicobulus must go to Ephesus himself to collect the rest. He lies to Nicobulus that his son has gone to the forum, and Nicobulus goes off there at once. Chrysalus, who knows that Mnesilochus is still at the harbour, departs the other way.

- Act 3.1–3.3 (368–499): trochaic septenarii (130 lines)

Pistoclerus's paedagogus Lydus comes out of Bacchis's house in a shocked mood. He says he is going to Pistoclerus's father to inform him about his son's shameful behaviour.

Mnesilochus now enters, accompanied by attendants. He tells the audience that he has met Chrysalus and learnt about his plan to get money to pay for Bacchis.

Suddenly he sees Lydus coming with Pistoclerus's father Philoxenus. Lydus is complaining about how children these days are completely undisciplined and refuse to be obedient to their paedagogi. Mnesilochus greets Philoxenus, and Lydus contrasts Mnesilochus's good behaviour with the poor behaviour of Pistoclerus. He goes on to tell Mnesilochus how, in the house next door, he had witnessed Pistoclerus making love to a prostitute from Samos called Bacchis. Mnesilochus is very upset to hear this. Philoxenus and Lydus leave Mnesilochus to deal with Pistoclerus, and they go inside.

=== Mnesilochus's anger ===
- Act 3.4 (500–525): iambic senarii (30 lines)

Mnesilochus is very angry that he has apparently been betrayed by Pistoclerus and determines to give all the gold to his father instead of keeping some for Bacchis. He adds that he will beg his father to forgive Chrysalus for deceiving him. He goes into his father's house.

- Act 3.5–3.6 (525–572): trochaic septenarii (47 lines)

Pistoclerus comes out of Bacchis's house, telling Bacchis through the door that he is going to look for Mnesilochus. Mnesilochus now comes out of his own house and meets Pistoclerus. At first he is very angry with him, but then Pistoclerus explains that there are two girls called Bacchis. Mnesilochus goes with him into Bacchis's house.

=== Mnesilochus's distress ===
- Act 4.1–4.2 (573–611): iambic senarii (39 lines)

A "parasite" or hanger-on of the soldier appears, together with the slave boy who had accompanied Bacchis's sister earlier. They knock on Bacchis's door. Pistoclerus answers the door. The parasite tells him that Bacchis's sister must pay 200 gold philippic coins or the soldier will take her off to Elateia. Pistoclerus tells him to inform the soldier that she refuses to go and is now in love with someone else. He threatens to break the parasite's jaw if he doesn't go away. The parasite departs.

- Act 4.3–4.4 (612–669): polymetric song (tr8, an, ba, cr, wil, tr8, cr) (58 lines)

Mnesilochus comes out from Bacchis's house, blaming himself bitterly for being so hasty and throwing away the opportunity to rescue Bacchis's sister. Pistoclerus joins him and tries to console him, but in vain. Suddenly the cunning slave Chrysalus turns up, congratulating himself on his cleverness at having tricked the old man out of such a large sum. He sees Pistoclerus and Mnesilochus and realises immediately that something is wrong.

- Act 4.4 (cont.) (670–760): trochaic septenarii (90 lines)

Mnesilochus tells Chrysalus the bad news. Chrysalus is alarmed that he will be punished for the deception, but Mnesilochus reassures him. He begs Chrysalus to think up another trick to get the money. Suddenly Chrysalus has an idea. He tells Pistoclerus to fetch out some writing tablets and sealing wax. Then he makes Mnesilochus write a letter to his father warning him that Chrysalus is about to cheat him again, and he must keep him in chains. Mnesilochus and Pistoclerus return to Bacchis's house.

=== Chrysalus's second and third trick ===
- Act 4.5–4.8 (761–924): iambic senarii (163 lines)

Chrysalus carries the letter to Nicobulus's house, gleefully anticipating his success. Nicobulus comes out, fuming with rage at being deceived earlier. Chrysalus hands him the letter, and after reading it, Nicobulus goes inside to fetch some burly slaves, and he orders them to tie Chrysalus up. Chrysalus taunts Nicobulus by calling him foolish, and adds that since "those whom the gods love die young" he can't be loved by any god. The enraged Nicobulus declares that Chrysalus will never take his gold, to which Chrysalus replies that Nicobulus will soon be begging him to take it, when he learns the danger his son is in. Nicobulus is alarmed, and asks Chrysalus to explain. Chrysalus leads him to the door of Bacchis's house, and urges him to peep inside. Nicobulus does so and sees both Pistoclerus and Mnesilochus carousing with their girlfriends. Chrysalus refuses to explain any further, however.

Suddenly Cleomachus, the soldier who had hired Bacchis's sister, arrives in a fury, saying he will kill Mnesilochus. Chrysalus now tells Nicobulus that the woman he saw kissing his son is not a prostitute but the soldier's wife. Nicobulus is even more alarmed and orders the slaves to untie Chrysalus. Chrysalus suggests that the soldier can be bought off with some money. He speaks to the soldier for a moment and then goes to Nicobulus and tells him that he has struck a bargain for 200 gold pieces to save his son, which Nicobulus promises to pay. Chrysalus then swears by all the gods to the soldier that Mnesilochus has gone to the country, and that the girl has gone to the acropolis to visit the temple of Minerva. Cleomachus believes him and hurries off to the forum to look for her. Chrysalus urges Nicobulus to enter Bacchis's house to rebuke his son, but Nicobulus leaves this task to Chrysalus. Nicobulus goes inside to re-read the letter.

- Act 4.9 (925-996a): iambic octonarii (24 lines), then mixed trochaic, ia8, wilamowitziani (48 lines)

Chrysalus sings a song of triumph; he compares himself to Agamemnon or Ulysses, and Nicobulus to Priam, but instead of storming Ilium's citadel (arcem) he is going to storm the old man's money-chest (arcam). Nicobulus comes out again and asks Chrysalus if he has rebuked his son. Chrysalus says that he has and shows him a second letter.

- Act 4.9 (cont.) (997–1075): iambic senarii (79 lines)

Nicobulus reads the letter aloud. In the letter Mnesilochus begs his father for 200 gold pieces. He says he has sworn to give the girl this money before she goes away, and begs his father not to allow him to perjure himself; he admits that he has done wrong and says Chrysalus should be thanked for correcting him. Chrysalus advises Nicobulus not to give him the money, but Nicobulus says he feels sorry for his son. He goes inside, fetches the money, and hands it over to Chrysalus together with the money for the soldier. Chrysalus takes the 400 gold pieces triumphantly into Bacchis's house.

- Act 4.10–5.1 (1076–1108): anapaests (33 lines)

Pistoclerus's father Philoxenus now appears. He says he is worried about his son and hopes that Mnesilochus has persuaded him to behave more sensibly.

Nicobulus approaches. Nicobulus is fuming that he has been made a fool of not once but twice. He says he has met the soldier and discovered the whole truth. The two men greet each other and commiserate.

- Act 5.1 (cont.) (1109–1116): cretic (8 lines)

Nicobulus tells Philoxenus that both young men have been cavorting with prostitutes.

- Act 5.1 (cont.) (1117–1119): trochaic septenarii (3 lines)

The two old men decide to knock on Bacchis's door to confront their sons.

=== The Bacchises seduce Philoxenus and Nicobulus ===
- Act 5.2 (1120-1140a): bacchiac (29 lines)

The two Bacchises come to the door and tease the old men, calling them sheep. The sister says that one of them "has been shorn twice today already!"

- Act 5.2 (cont.) (1149–1206): anapaests (58 lines)

Nicobulus and Philoxenus tell them angrily that these "sheep" have come to fetch their "lambs", as well as the "dog" who is with them. The two ladies consult together and agree to seduce the old men. Meanwhile Philoxenus tells Nicobulus that he finds Bacchis's sister very attractive. He is ready to go inside, but Nicobulus remains angry and determined to punish Chrysalus; he is unpersuaded even when Bacchis offers to give him half the money back. Eventually, however, he is prevailed upon by the others to follow them inside.

- Act 5.2 (cont.) (1207–1211): trochaic septenarii (4 lines)

The leader of the company tells the audience that it is the two men's own immoral characters that have made them behave so disgracefully, and asks for applause.

== Plautus and Menander ==
In 1968 were published, pieced together from 13 fragments of papyrus discovered in Egypt, some 80 lines of a play believed to be Menander's Dis Exapaton (Δὶς Ἐξαπατῶν), allowing scholars to see in detail for the first time how Plautus made use of Menander's material. These lines correspond to Bacchides 494–562. It is evident that Plautus adapted, rather than simply translated, the Menander play. In Menander the characters have different names. Lydus is still Lydos, but Mnesilochus is Sostratos, Pistoclerus is Moschos, and Chrysalus is called Syros. In Menander's play, there is a scene where Sostratus tells his father about the money; this is followed by a choral interlude and then another (fragmentary) scene involving Sostratos and his father. All of this is omitted by Plautus. The simple meeting between Sostratos and his friend Moschos in Menander is greatly expanded in Plautus (534–539) to an elaborate symmetrical monologue more typical of the Plautine style. In lines 526–72 Plautus has used recitative verse (trochaic septenarii) in place of Menander's spoken iambic trimeters.

Plautus may have made other changes in his adaptation. For example, in Plautus, it is possible that the scene where Lydus comes out of the brothel has been moved to later in the play: since Lydus himself says that he spent only a few moments there, it is likely that in Menander he came out almost at once rather than nearly 200 lines later. Plautus may have moved the scene to replace a choral interlude in Menander.

Another change that it has been suggested that Plautus may have made is to introduce a third deception to Menander's play. The third deception involves the concept of fides ("loyalty, faith, keeping one's word"), which is a particularly Roman one. It is argued by Owens (1994) that the typically Roman behaviour of Nicobulus is contrasted with the untrustworthy deceptive behaviour of Chrysalus, which to a Roman audience might have seemed typically Greek. In the scene between Mnesilochus and Pistoclerus also, Plautus has greatly expanded on the importance of keeping one's word (lines 540–542), whereas in the corresponding Menander passage Sostratos merely accused Bacchis of acting unjustly.

== Etymology ==
Several of the characters names are significant. Nicobulus ironically means Victorious in counsel, Chrysalus means Goldie, Cleomachus means Glorious fighter, and Bacchis means Bacchant, a female worshipper of Bacchus, god of wine.

== Translations ==
- Henry Thomas Riley, 1912: Bacchides full text
- Paul Nixon, 1916–38: Bacchides full text
- Edward Holdsworth Sugden, 1942
- James Tatum, 1983
- John Barsby, 1986
- Deena and Douglass Parker Berg, 1999
- Wolfang de Melo, 2011
