= Bacchides (eunuch) =

Ancient Pontic Greek eunuch

Bacchides (Ancient Greek: Βακχίδης) was a eunuch of the Pontic Greek ruler Mithridates VI Eupator during the Third Mithridatic War.

In 71 BCE, when Mithridates's defeat at the hands of the Roman general Lucullus seemed imminent, Mithridates in despair dispatched Bacchides to Pharnacia (modern Giresun) to either kill -- or warn them to kill themselves -- his wives and sisters, lest they be captured by his enemies.

While some writers describe this as an act of despair, some, such as the Roman historian Plutarch, describe it as an act of strength, knowing "the strong man fears shame more than death".

The 2nd century CE Greek historian Appian wrote that the eunuch's name was "Bacchus".

The 1st-century BCE Greek historian Strabo mentions another "Bacchides" who was the governor of Sinope at the time when this town was besieged by Lucullus, who is possibly the same as the above.
