= Hosidius Geta =

Roman playwright (late 2nd/early 3rd century AD)

Hosidius Geta (/ˈɡɛtə/ GHET-ə; fl. late 2nd – early 3rd century AD) was a Roman playwright. Tertullian refers to him as his contemporary in the De Prescriptione Haereticorum.

Geta was the author of a tragedy in 462 verses titled Medea. It is the earliest known example of a Virgilian cento, that is, a poem constructed entirely out of lines and half-lines from the works of Virgil. The poet used Virgilian hexameters for the spoken parts of the play, and half-hexameters for the choral parts.

== Bibliography ==
- Text edited by R. Lamacchia, Medea. Cento Vergilianus (Teubner, 1981)
- Text, Translation, and Commentary by Maria Teresa Galli [Latin-Italian with English Summaries]. Vertumnus. Berliner Beiträge zur Klassischen Philologie und zu ihren Nachbargebieten, vol. 10, Göttingen: Edition Ruprecht 2017, ISBN 978-3-8469-0121-2

== Sources ==
- ancientlibrary.com^{[usurped]}
