= Sociae Mimae =

Sociae Mimae was a Roman guild for female stage artists, mimae (essentially singers, dancers and actresses), in Ancient Rome. It is the only ancient Roman guild exclusively for women of which there is currently any information. The guild financed its own burial grounds and was apparently quite well off.

Stage acting was divided into several categories: saltatrices (dancers), gesticularia (performers of gestures), embolaria (musicians), women who performed pantomime, dance (solo or in group) and singing (solo or in group), musical actors, actors in speaking roles, and gladiatrices (gladiators). Most female actors did not perform speaking roles, but there were a minority of elite actresses who did have such roles.

All of these professions were formally and technically classified as infamis, dishonorable professions (for both women and men). Because of this, they were often performed by slaves hired out by their enslavers; by former slaves; or by freeborn people born into the profession.

The guild has been referred to as the only guild in ancient Rome reserved for women. While women are confirmed to have been active in a number of professions, and were allowed to both be members in, and the protectors of, several guilds, among them the Merchant Guild, no other guilds exclusively for women are known.

The Sociae Mimae was able to afford their own graveyard in Rome, which indicates that it was a guild with resources. While the income of an average actors was no higher than that of a common laborer, stage performers also received personal gifts from the audience and from private benefactors. This caused them to be sometimes referred to as prostitutes, but a gift from a benefactor was not necessarily given in exchange for sex. There were also individual actresses who were employed at theatres for speaking parts and could receive a high income, and there are examples of female stage artists in Ancient Rome who lived lives in luxury.

The ancient stage acting profession existed until at least the fall of West Rome and in the East Rome (Byzantine Empire) until at least the 6th century. After the introduction of Christianity as a state religion in the 4th century, actors, who were already considered īnfāmēs, were subjected to even more accusations of immorality, and seen as symbols of the sins of the old Pagan society. Particularly female actors were condemned as prostitutes and harlots, and all actors were pressured to leave their profession for a life of pious virtue, or heavily condemned as sinners. In Carthage, so many actors left the profession that the city authorities asked actresses to return to the profession in 413 because the profession was about to die out. By the 5th century, the Christian condemnation of actresses resulted in the profession dying, and there were examples where women were forced in to the profession, something which was banned in Eastern Rome in 535.
