= Cistellaria =

Latin play by Titus Maccius Plautus

- Original language: Latin
- Written by: Plautus
- Based on: Synaristosai
- Characters: Selenium; Gymnasium; Gymnasium's mother; Alcesimarchus; Alcesimarchus's slave; Alcesimarchus's father; Melaenis; Lampadio; Phanostrata; Halisca; Demipho
- Genre: Roman comedy
- Setting: Sicyon

Premiere
- Date: late 3rd century BC
- Place: Rome?

Cistellaria, translated as The Casket, is a comedic Latin play of the late 3rd century BC by the early Roman playwright Titus Maccius Plautus. The story, set in the Greek town of Sicyon, concerns a girl called Selenium who was exposed as a baby and brought up by a courtesan called Melaenis. By a happy chance it is discovered that her birth mother, married to a senator Demipho, lives next door, enabling her to marry the young man Alcesimarchus who loves her.

The play was adapted from a lost comedy by Menander called Synaristosai ("The Women Who Lunched Together"). The Cistellaria appears to be one of Plautus's earliest plays. In line 202, the hope is expressed that the war with Carthage will soon end with victory for the Romans (the Second Punic War in fact ended in 202 BC). The same passage mentions "your allies old and new", which may be a reference to the treaty of alliance made with the Aetolian League in 209.

== Characters ==
- Selenium: a young courtesan, who turns out to be free-born
- Gymnasium: a prostitute, friend of Selenium
- Gymnasium's mother: (unnamed) also a prostitute
- Alcesimarchus: a young man of Sicyon, in love with Selenium
- Alcesimarchus's slave: (unnamed)
- Alcesimarchus's father: (unnamed)
- Melaenis: a prostitute, who adopted Selenium as a baby
- Lampadio: slave of Phanostrata
- Phanostrata: wife of Demipho, and birth-mother of Selenium
- Halisca: maidservant of Melaenis
- Demipho: a senator of Sicyon, husband of Phanostrata

== Metrical structure ==
Plautus's plays are traditionally divided into five acts. However, it is not thought that the act-divisions go back to Plautus's time, since no manuscript contains them before the 15th century. Also, the acts themselves do not always match the structure of the plays, which is often more clearly shown by the variation in metres.

A common pattern in Plautus is for a metrical section to begin with iambic senarii (which were unaccompanied by music), followed optionally by a musical passage or song, and ending with trochaic septenarii, which were recited or sung to the music of a pair of pipes known as tibiae.

Although parts of the play are now lost because pages are missing from the manuscripts, the structure of the play seems to be as follows, taking A = iambic senarii, B = other metres, C = trochaic septenarii:

BBC, ABC, ABABCBC, AC, BBAC

Instead of the usual iambic senarii, this play opens with a polymetric song. The last section also opens with a polymetric song. In addition there are three passages in iambic septenarii, and a wild passage in anapaests where the young lover Alcesimarchus sings of his distress.

=== Selenium outlines her problem ===
- Act 1.1 (1–37): polymetric song (ba, ia-tr, an, cr) (37 lines)

The courtesan Selenium comes out of her house with two other women, old and young, having given them lunch. Both of them thank Selenium for the lunch, though the old woman complains that the wine was too little.

- Act 1.1 (38–58): iambic septenarii (21 lines)

The old woman reminds Selenium that she and Selenium's mother were both prostitutes, and now her daughter Gymnasium plies the same trade.

- Act 1.1 (59–119): trochaic septenarii (61 lines)

Selenium, however, tells them that she has never slept with any man except Alcesimarchus, whom she loves and who has promised to marry her; but she is distressed because she has heard that he is engaged to marry the daughter of a rich man who lives next door. She then begs the old lady to let Gymnasium look after her house for three days, since her mother has called for her. She gives Gymnasium the key and departs.

=== Selenium's birth and parentage are explained ===
- Act 1.2–1.3 (120–202): iambic senarii (79 lines)

The old prostitute explains to the audience that years earlier she had found Selenium as a baby exposed in the street, and had given her to Selenium's mother to bring up. It appears that the latter had wished to use the baby to deceive a foreign lover.

After she leaves, the deity Auxilium ("Help") appears. She explains to the audience that a few years back a certain merchant had come from Lemnos to Sicyon; he had raped a well-born girl and fled back to Lemnos. In Lemnos he had married, but after giving birth to a daughter his wife had died. Later he had returned to Sicyon and married the same girl he had raped; and after learning about the baby that had been exposed, he had instructed her servant to make efforts to find her. Meanwhile Selenium had grown up, and a young man had fallen in love with her, and she with him; but his father wants him to marry a cousin from Lemnos.

=== Alcesimarchus's passion for Selenium ===
- Act 2.1 (203–228): anapaestic song (28 lines)

The young man Alcesimarchus enters and sings passionately about the torments of being in love. He relates how his father had detained him in the country for six days.

(There is a gap in the manuscripts here of about 100 lines. Lines 231–491 which follow the gap exist only in the Ambrosian palimpsest and are illegible in parts.)

- Act 2.2–2.3 (231–272): trochaic septenarii (42+ lines)

Alcesimarchus orders his slave to reproach him bitterly for failing to see Selenium during these six days. The slave does as he is told.

(253–272: Only a few traces survive. Another 70 lines is missing after 266.)

=== Alcesimarchus learns about the wedding preparations ===
Alcesimarchus visits Selenium's house and is told by Gymnasium about the wedding preparations.

- Act 2.3 (cont.) (273–304): iambic senarii (32 lines)

Alcesimarchus appears to become delirious. He calls on his slave to bring him his armour, a horse, and a troupe of soldiers. Gymnasium and the slave react with alarm. She advises him not to fight against love but to go to Selenium's mother and beg forgiveness.

(Another 70 lines are lost here.)

- Act 2.4 (305–373): iambic septenarii (37 lines)

(322–362 are fragments only.) Alcesimarchus's father, who is unnamed, visits Selenium's house to tell her to keep away from his son. He finds Gymnasium there, and mistakes her for Selenium. He is smitten by her beauty, and she teases him by flirting with him...

(There is another gap in the manuscript of about 55 lines between 372 and 389, and then only a few letters survive until line 449. Ten fragments quoted by the grammarians Priscian and Nonius, 15 lines in all, mostly in iambic senarii, are thought to belong in the gap. The last of these, 405–408, can definitely be placed as it matches the traces that survive.)

- Act 2.5–2.6 (cont.) (374–408): iambic senarii (15 lines)

Gymnasium's mother comes to Alcesimarchus's house to fetch Gymnasium, who seems reluctant to leave.

Lampadio, the servant who has been instructed to find Selenium, has been following Gymnasium's mother. He describes the ugly prostitutes he has seen in various brothels while searching for her....

- Act 2.7 (449–452): iambic octonarii (4 lines)

...Alcesimarchus pleads with Selenium and her mother Melaenis, but to no avail. Selenium departs.

- Act 2.7 (453–460): trochaic septenarii (8 lines)

He continues to plead but Melaenis chides him for breaking his oath.

- Act 2.7 (461–464): fragmentary, metre uncertain, probably iambic (4 lines)

Alcesimarchus still refuses to go.

- Act 2.7 (465–535): trochaic septenarii (68 lines)

He swears that he will never marry the Lemnian girl his father has chosen for him. Melaenis swears for her part that she will never let him marry her daughter. Alcesimarchus swears by a list of gods (he makes errors in their relationships and she has to correct him) that he will kill them both unless she sends Selenium back to him. He departs. Melaenis decides to follow him to make sure he doesn't do anything stupid. Suddenly she sees Lampadio approaching.

=== Melaenis finds out about Selenium's parents ===
- Act 2.8–2.9 (536–630): iambic senarii (95 lines)

Lampadio, the servant who has been told to look for Demipho's daughter, talks to himself about how he followed the old woman. His mistress Phanostrata (Demipho's wife) hears him and comes out of her house. He tells her that the old woman had told him that Gymnasium was not the girl he was looking for but that she had given the baby to a prostitute called Melaenis. He says the old lady refused to tell him where Melaenis lived but that he would soon find out.

Melaenis, who has overheard all this, steps forward and questions Lampadio. He tells her that the master of the house is Demipho and he explains about Demipho's two daughters, one the product of rape. Melaenis decides to go home and fetch Selenium so that she can restore her to her wealthy parents.

- Act 3.1–4.1 (631–670): trochaic septenarii (39 lines)

Melaenis comes back with Selenium and a maid. She is carrying a small casket (cistella) which contains a child's rattle which will prove Selenium's identity. She hands the casket to her maid, Halisca, and orders her to knock on Demipho's door.

Suddenly Alcesimarchus comes out of his house. He is carrying a sword and is about to kill himself. The three women rush towards him. He grabs Selenium and pulls her inside. Melaenis and Halisca follow him. In the confusion, Halisca drops the casket.

Lampadio comes back. He is angry because Gymnasium's mother has now denied everything she confessed earlier. He finds the casket. Phanostrata, who has come from the doorway of Demipho's house, suddenly recognises the casket as the one she had given her daughter.

=== Phanostrata and Demipho find their daughter ===
- Act 4.2 (671–703): polymetric song (an, ba, cr) (33 lines)

Halisca comes out of Alcesimarchus's house, looking frantically for the casket. Lampadio and Phanostrata overhear her as she sings.

- Act 4.2 (704–773): iambic septenarii (43 lines)

Halisca is about to go back when Lampadio and Phanostrata call her. She asks if anyone has found a casket. At first Lampadio and Phanostrata are suspicious of a trick and give nothing away. Eventually after she reveals that it contains a rattle, Lampadio says he knows where it is, but he wants a reward. Phanostrata ignores him and says she needs to speak to Halisca.

- Act 4.2 (747–773): iambic senarii (27 lines)

She asks Halisca where the owner of the casket is, and Halisca points to Alcesimarchus's house. She says Melaenis intends to return Selenium to her parents but meanwhile she would like the casket back. Phanostrata returns the casket and follows Halisca inside Alcesimarchus's house.

- Act 5.1 (774–787): trochaic septenarii (14 lines)

Demipho now arrives from a senate meeting. He asks Lampadio to explain what is going on, since he has heard a lot of gossip in the street. Lampadio tells him he has a new daughter. They go together into Alcesimarchus's house. The production troupe now come forward and tell the audience that the play ends here, and ask for applause.

== Translations ==
- English translation by Henry Thomas Riley at Perseus: Cistellaria
- Wolfang de Melo, 2011
