= Apollodorus =

Apollodorus (Greek: Ἀπολλόδωρος Apollodoros) was a popular name in ancient Greece. It is the masculine gender of a noun compounded from Apollo, the deity, and doron, "gift"; that is, "Gift of Apollo." It may refer to:

== Artists ==
- Apollodorus (painter), Athenian painter who lived at the end of the 5th century BC and introduced great improvements in perspective and chiaroscuro
- Apollodorus (sculptor) (fl. c. 324 BC), Greek sculptor in bronze so picky he often broke his works in pieces after he finished them

== Authors ==
- Apollodorus (fl. 1st or 2nd century AD), author of the Bibliotheca, sometimes called "Pseudo-Apollodorus" to distinguish him from Apollodorus of Athens (below), with whom he was sometimes confused
- Apollodorus of Acharnae (394–after 343 BC), Athenian litigant and orator, some of whose speeches are transmitted among the work of Demosthenes
- Apollodorus of Artemita (fl. 130–87 BC), Greek historian of the Parthian empire
- Apollodorus of Athens (c. 180 BC–after 120 BC), Greek historian and grammarian
- Apollodorus of Carystus (fl. 300–260 BC), New Comedy playwright
- Apollodorus of Cumae, Greek grammarian
- Apollodorus of Cyrene, Greek grammarian
- Apollodorus of Erythrae, ancient Greek writer
- Apollodorus of Gela (fl. 340–290 BC), New Comedy playwright
- Apollodorus of Lemnos, ancient Greek writer on agriculture
- Apollodorus of Pergamon, 1st century BC rhetorician
- Apollodorus of Tarsus, tragic poet
- Apollodorus of Telmessus, writer on dreams

== Philosophers ==
- Apollodorus the Epicurean (fl. 2nd century BC), Athenian philosopher and author of the Life of Epicurus, head of the Epicurean school in Athens
- Apollodorus of Phaleron (c. 429–4th century BC), follower of Socrates and narrator of the dialogue described by Plato in his Symposium
- Apollodorus of Seleucia (fl. c. 150 BC), Stoic philosopher

== Rulers and generals ==
- Apollodorus (general), Athenian general of the 4th century BC
- Apollodorus of Amphipolis (fl. 331 BC), Macedonian cavalry general under Alexander the Great
- Apollodorus of Cassandreia (died 276 or 275 BC), a tyrant of the city of Cassandreia
- Apollodorus of Susiana, satrap of Susiana appointed in 220 BC

== Other ==
- Apollodorus (jurist) (fl. 435–438 AD), jurist involved in the compilation of the Theodosian Code
- Apollodorus (physician), two physicians mentioned by Pliny the Elder
- Apollodorus (runner), Macedonian runner and Olympic champion of the 1st century AD
- Apollodorus of Boeotia, ambassador sent by the Boeotians to the Messenians in 183 BC
- Apollodorus of Cyzicus, two different persons from ancient Greece, one mentioned by Plato, the other by Diogenes Laertius
- Apollodorus of Damascus, Nabataean architect and engineer in the 2nd century AD
- Apollodorus of Macedonia (fl. 198 BC), Macedonian scribe, secretary to King Philip V of Macedon
- Apollodorus of Nicaea, citizen of Nicaea mentioned by Stephanus of Byzantium
- Apollodorus Logisticus, ancient Greek mathematician
- Apollodorus Pyragrus, Sicilian of the 1st century BC mentioned by Cicero
- Apollodorus the Sicilian (fl. 48 BC), loyal follower of Cleopatra

== See also ==
- Apollodorus of Smyrna, a copyist error for Apollonides of Smyrna
- Apollo (disambiguation)
- Apollinaris (disambiguation)
- Apollonia (disambiguation)
- Apollonius (disambiguation)
