= Didaskalia =

Didaskalia or didascalia may refer to:

- Didaskalia (journal)
- Didascalia Apostolorum
- Didaskalia Iakobou
- Εισαγωγική Διδασκαλία by Daniel Moscopolites

== See also ==
- Didascaliae
