= Hecyra =

Ancient Roman play by Terence

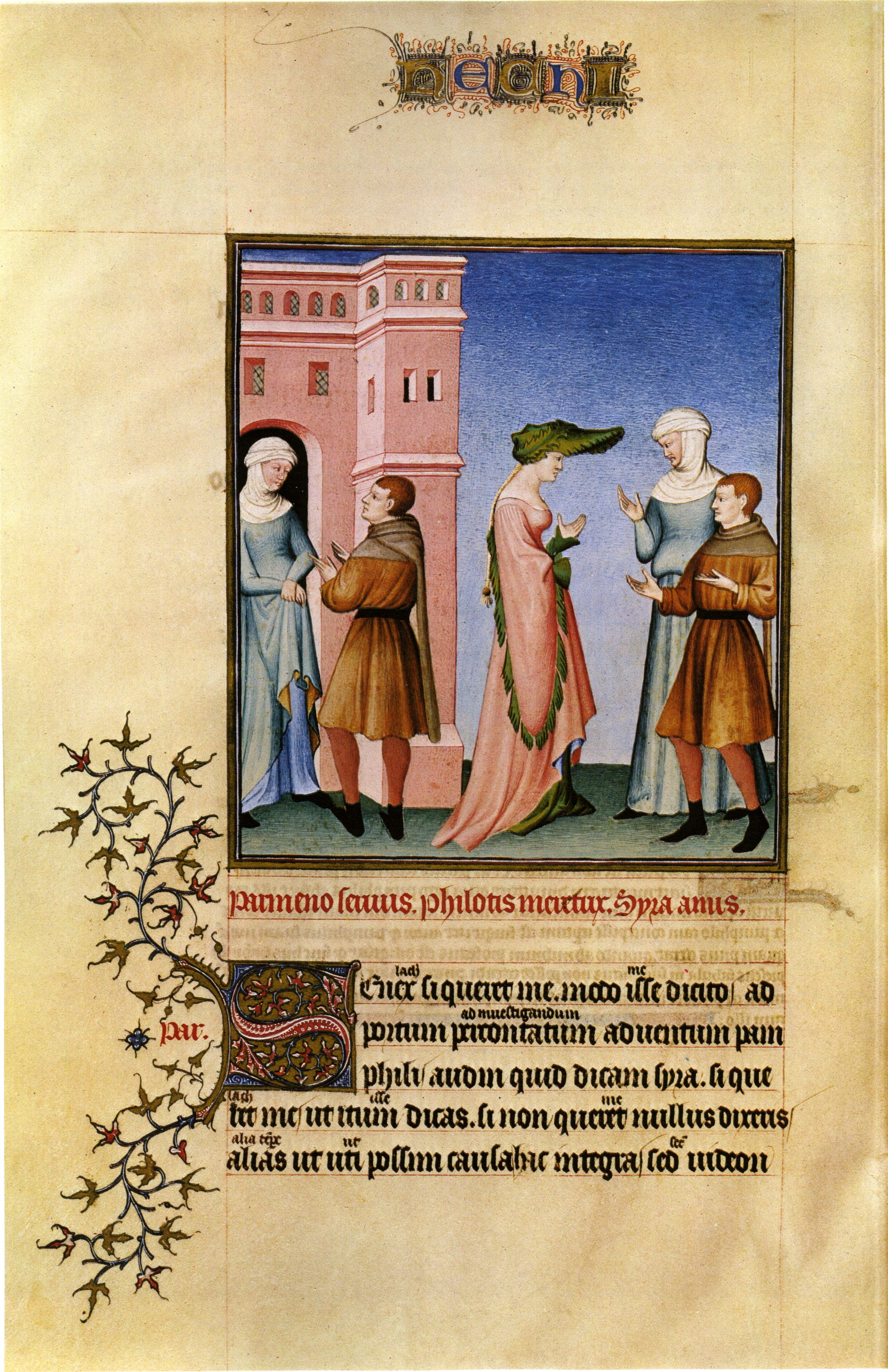
An early 15th century French manuscript depicts a scene in Hecyra, from the collection of the Bibliothèque de l'Arsenal.

Hecyra (The Mother-in-Law) is a comedic Latin play by the early Roman playwright Terence. The story concerns a young man, Pamphilus, who has a girlfriend, the courtesan Bacchis, but is forced by his father to marry a neighbour's daughter Philumena. Before the wedding took place Philumena was raped by an unknown man. When a baby is born, Pamphilus at first disowns Philumena, but in the end it turns out that he himself is the father of the baby and husband and wife are reconciled. Much of the play deals with the distress which Pamphilus's behaviour causes himself and his own and Philumena's parents. A comedic element is provided by a lazy gossip-hungry slave, Parmeno, who is made to run around on errands and is kept in the dark about what is happening. The mother-in-law in the title is Pamphilus's mother Sostrata, who is falsely accused of unkindness towards Philumena; but Pamphilus's own mother-in-law Myrrina also has an important role.

The second of Terence's plays to be written (after Andria), Hecyra was a failure at its first two stagings. The first in 165 BC was disrupted when a rumor spread that a tightrope-walker and boxers were about to perform. This upset is referred to in the prologue of Terence's fifth play Phormio, produced in 161 BC. In 160 BC the production was cancelled when the theater was stormed by a group of rowdy gladiator-fans. It was presented successfully only at its third attempt later that same year.

A musical phrase accompanying a single line of Hecyra was copied in the 18th century by Italian composer Arcangelo Corelli from a 10th-century manuscript and was for a long time believed to be all that remains of the entire body of ancient Roman music. However, musicologist Thomas J. Mathiesen comments that it is no longer believed to be authentic.

Hecyra is based on plays by Apollodorus of Carystus and Menander.

== Characters ==
- Laches – Athenian gentleman and father of Pamphilus.
- Sostrata – Wife of Laches. The mother-in-law of the play's title.
- Pamphilus – Son of Laches and Sostrata. Married to Philumena
- Phidippus – Athenian gentleman and father of Philumena. Neighbour to Laches
- Myrrhina – Wife of Phidippus.
- Syra – An old bawd.
- Philotis – A young prostitute.
- Bacchis – A courtesan and mistress to Pamphilus.
- Parmeno – Laches's slave.
- Sosia – Another slave to Laches.
- Philumena – Wife of Pamphilus and daughter of Phidippus and Myrrina. She does not appear on stage.

== Summary ==
The son of the elderly Laches and wife Sostrata, a young man named Pamphilus, is enamored with a prostitute, Bacchis, yet in a drunken fit one night, he decides to debauch a young woman named Philumena, the daughter of Phidippus and Myrrhina. After a struggle, he rapes Philumena and from her finger tears a ring, which he afterwards gives to his girlfriend, Bacchis.

After some hesitation, Pamphilus finally consents to an arranged marriage. By chance, the woman chosen for him is Philumena, and she alone knows that she had been raped by an unidentified man, and she hopes that her disgrace is concealed. When the young man and woman are first married, Pamphilus does not originally sleep with his wife, but after the marriage Bacchis rejects Pamphilus, and over time he becomes more and more enamored with his new wife.

Pamphilus is then called away from the city, and Philumena finds herself pregnant from the rape. She fears detection, and she especially avoids her mother-in-law, Sostrata. She returns to her parents' home, where Sostrata seeks her, but Philumena claims illness and will not allow the mother-in-law inside the house.

Pamphilus returns home during the birth of the baby, and the situation brings him great distress, as he fears his now beloved wife has been unfaithful, and he decides to set Philumena aside. Myrrhina, the wife of Phidippus, then begs him to keep the pregnancy a secret, but he declines to take back Philumena. Laches then states his suspicion that Pamphilus is still enamored with Bacchis, but this supposition is proven untrue. It is then that the stolen ring is discovered by Myrrhina on Bacchis's finger, and Pamphilus realizes the baby is his. He happily takes back his wife and new son.

The location of the play is Athens. The action takes place in the street in front of two houses, that of Pamphilus's family, and that of Philumena's next door.

== Metrical analysis ==
The metrical analysis below is based on the database Meters of Roman Comedy by Timothy Moore, published by the Washington University in St Louis.

The metres used in the play in terms of number of lines are as follows:

- iambic senarii (ia6): 45% (this metre was unaccompanied, the others sung)
- trochaic septenarii (tr7): 25%
- iambic septenarii (ia7): 14%
- iambic octonarii (ia8): 13%
- trochaic octonarii (tr8): 3%

Other metres (tr4, ia4, ia4cat) form less than 0.5% of the play. An unusual amount of this play (55% of the lines or 61% of the metrical elements) is accompanied by music, more than any other Terence play.

In many plays the metres form a pattern, dividing the plays into sections: A = ia6, B = other metres, C = tr7. However, in the Hecyra this pattern is less obvious.

The different metres are used for different purposes. The male characters (Parmeno, Laches, and Phidippus), apart from Pamphilus, often speak in the unaccompanied iambic senarii (ia6), whereas the main female characters (Sostrata, Myrrina, and Bacchis) sing most of their lines. Trochaic septenarii (tr7) are used in several passages when the characters show their ignorance about what is really going on, such as when Laches accuses his wife of mistreating Philumena. Iambic octonarii (ia8) are often used when the characters are expressing emotions, either joy or anguish. Iambic septenarii (ia7) have been called the "metre of love"; they are used in this play mostly in passages talking about Philumena.

=== Prologues ===
- Prologues 1 and 2 (1–57): ia6 (8 lines + 50 lines)

The two prologues speak about the reasons for failure of the first two productions of the Hecyra, but do not discuss the story. The background to the play is revealed in the second scene by the slave Parmeno, who, crucially, however, is never aware of the whole story. Thus the various developments in the plot come as a surprise to the audience.

=== Pamphilus's wife returns to her mother ===
- Act 1.1–1.2 (58–197): ia6 (140 lines)

A young courtesan, Philotis, and an old one, Syra, discuss the unfaithfulness of lovers, not least the young man Pamphilus, who has given up his girlfriend Bacchis to get married.

– The slave Parmeno comes out, and explains to Philotis that his young master Pamphilus was forced against his will by his father Laches to marry Philumena, the daughter of a neighbour. It seems that Pamphilus at first did not consummate the marriage, and continued to visit Bacchis, hoping that Philumena would lose patience and leave him. Gradually, however, Pamphilus began to transfer his affections to Philumena. But then he was sent abroad on family business to collect an inheritance on the island of Imbros. Philumena remained at home but (Parmeno says) fell out with Pamphilus's mother, Sostrata, and eventually went back to her own mother, refusing to see Sostrata when she called, saying that she was ill. Pamphilus's father, Laches, meanwhile has come from the country to confer with Philumena's father. Philotis makes an excuse and leaves.

- Act 2.1 (198–216): mixed ia8, ia6 (19 lines)

Laches and Sostrata come out quarrelling. He asks why women have to be so troublesome to their husbands and daughters-in-law.

- Act 2.1 (217–242): tr7 (26 lines)

Despite Sostrata's protestations, Laches blames his wife for the ill-feeling between her and Philumena.

- Act 2.2 (243–273): ia7 (31 lines)

Laches notices Philumena's father, Phidippus, coming out into the street and begs him to explain if there is a problem. Phidippus tells him that Philumena has no quarrel with Pamphilus but refuses to return until Pamphilus gets back from his trip. The two men depart to the forum.

- Act 2.3 (274–280): tr7 (7 lines)

Left alone, Sostrata complains that she has been accused unjustly. She goes inside.

=== Pamphilus discovers about the baby ===
- Act 3.1 (281–292): mixed tr8, tr7 (12 lines)

Pamphilus, who has now returned from his trip, is complaining to Parmeno how unhappy he is with the situation.

- Act 3.1 (293–326): ia8 (31 lines), ia7 (3 lines)

While Pamphilus sings of his distress, Parmeno tries to console him. Suddenly they hear a shriek from Phidippus's house. Pamphilus goes into Phidippus's house to investigate.

- Act 3.1 (327–335): ia6 (9 lines)

Parmeno stays alone in the street, explaining that he thinks that will be safest for him.

- Act 3.2 (336–360): ia7 (25 lines)

Sostrata comes out, intending to visit Philumena, but Parmeno advises against it. Now Pamphilus comes out of Phidippus's house; he tells his mother that Philumena has a "fever" and tells her to go back to her own house. Meanwhile he sends Parmeno away on an errand to help the slave boy bring his luggage from the port.

- Act 3.3 (361–408): tr7 (48 lines)

In a soliloquy, Pamphilus explains how when he went into the house he was shocked to discover Philumena in labour. Philumena's mother Myrrina had begged him to keep the matter a secret, explaining that two months before her marriage the girl had been raped by an unknown person. Myrrina had undertaken to have the baby exposed at once. But Pamphilus declares that though he loves Philumena there can be no question of taking her back after this.

=== Pamphilus refuses to take back his wife ===
- Act 3.3–3.4 (409–450): ia6 (42 lines)

Pamphilus sees Parmeno returning and explains that Parmeno, who knows that he had no intercourse with Philumena for the first two months of their marriage, must not find out about the baby or Philumena will be ruined.

– Now Parmeno returns. He is talking to another slave, Sosia, who had accompanied Pamphilus on the voyage; Sosia is telling Parmeno about the awfulness of the journey by sea. Pamphilus immediately sends the puzzled Parmeno away on another errand. Pamphilus sees his father and Philippus approaching, and stands to one side.

- Act 3.5 (451–484): tr7 (34 lines)

Laches and Phidippus come out. Laches asks Pamphilus about the inheritance he went to collect. The two fathers try to pretend that Philumena returned home because her father requested it, but Pamphilus says he already knows the whole story. He declares that since a quarrel has arisen between Philumena and Sostrata, he must give up his wife.

=== Phidippus discovers about the baby ===
- Act 3.5 (485–515): ia6 (34 lines)

Pamphilus tells Phidippus that he is very unwilling to give up Philumena since he loves her a lot but he must do so out of duty for his mother. Phidippus grows angry and says Pamphilus has grown proud since receiving the inheritance. He goes back to his house. Laches also goes inside to "vomit out" his anger on his wife for causing the quarrel.

- Act 4.1 (516–534): mixed metres (tr7, tr8, etc.) (19 lines)

Philumena's mother Myrrina comes out in distress. She says her husband Phidippus has discovered about the baby. Phidippus comes out and she lies to him that the father is Pamphilus. Phidippus angrily reproaches his wife for wanting to send his grandson to be exposed.

- Act 4.1 (535–565): tr7 (9 lines), ia8 (3 lines), tr7 (19 lines)

Phidippus mistakenly supposes she wants the marriage to be broken off merely because she doesn't like the fact that Pamphilus used to keep a mistress. He defends Pamphilus's behaviour and forbids Myrrina to have the baby exposed. He goes inside to order to servants not to expose the child.

- Act 4.1–4.2 (566–606): ia8 (41 lines)

Left alone, Myrrina expresses her distress. She is afraid to tell Phidippus that the child's father is an unknown rapist; nor does she herself want to bring up such a baby; it would equally bad to pretend that the child is Pamphilus's. She goes back inside.

– Sostrata and Pamphilus come out. Sostrata defends herself from the accusation that she has been unkind to Philumena, and now declares that she will go away and live with her husband in the country. This idea distresses Pamphilus.

- Act 4.3 (607–622): mixed iambic metres (16 lines)

Laches comes out and says he has overheard what they are saying, and despite Pamphilus's protestations encourages his wife to join him in the country.

=== Bacchis reveals that Pamphilus is the father ===
- Act 4.4 (623–726): ia6 (104 lines)

Phidippus comes back out from his house and Laches tells him that Sostrata is going to move to the country, so now Philumena can come back. Phidippus tells him that the separation is Myrrina's fault, not Sostrata's. He reveals to Laches that Philumena has had a child. Laches urges Pamphilus to take back his wife or at least the child. When he declines, Laches accuses Pamphilus of still being in love with Bacchis. Pamphilus, in distress, runs away. Phidippus suggests that they ought to summon Bacchis and talk to her. Meanwhile Phidippus goes to look for a nurse.

- Act 5.1 (727–754): mixed iambic-trochaic metres (28 lines)

Bacchis appears with two maids. Laches tells her that because of her affair with Pamphilus, Pamphilus's mother-in-law has broken up the marriage, and that they want to expose the baby. He begs her to find another boyfriend. Bacchis swears indignantly that as soon as Pamphilus got married she broke off the affair. Laches begs her to go into Phidippus's house and say the same thing to the women.

- Act 5.1 (755–767): tr7 (13 lines)

Bacchis promises that she will do so for the sake of Pamphilus. Laches thanks her and advises her to use him as a friend rather than to make him an enemy.

- Act 5.2 (768–798): tr8 (1 line), ia7 (29 lines), tr8 (1 line)

Phidippus returns with a nurse, whom he sends inside. Laches introduces Bacchis. Since Philippus doesn't trust her oath, she even offers up her maids for torture to prove her words. Although Bacchis is reluctant to meet Philumena, she agrees to go and talk to her. They go inside.

- Act 5.3 (799–815): tr7 (17 lines)

The slave Parmeno returns; he complains that his errand has been a waste of time. He is surprised to see Bacchis coming out of Phidippus's house. She tells him not to ask questions but to run immediately to fetch Pamphilus and tell him that Myrrina has recognised her ring as one that used to belong to Philumena.

- Act 5.3 (816–840): ia7 (25 lines)

When Parmeno has gone, Bacchis explains to the audience that ten months' previously Pamphilus, when drunk, had given her the ring, and confessed to her that he had taken it from an unknown girl he had raped. The baby is therefore his own.

- Act 5.4 (841–853): mixed trochaic metres (12 lines), ia8 (1 line)

Pamphilus arrives, joyfully questioning Parmeno (who still doesn't understand) about the ring.

=== Pamphilus thanks Bacchis ===
- Act 5.4 (854–858): ia6 (5 lines)

Pamphilus sees Bacchis and delightedly greets her.

- Act 5.4 (859–868): ia8 (10 lines)

He says it is always a pleasure to see her. She tells him Philumena seems a very nice person. He begs her not to reveal the embarrassing truth to his father.

- Act 5.4 (869–880): tr7 (12 lines)

Parmeno is still puzzled but grateful to have been of assistance. They all go inside.

== Bibliography ==
- English translation by Henry Thomas Riley at Perseus: Hecyra
- Gilula, Dwora (1979). "Terence's Hecyra: A Delicate Balance of Suspense and Dramatic Irony". Scripta Classica Israelica, vol 5.
- Goldberg, Sander M. (ed.) (2013). Terence: Hecyra. Cambridge Greek and Latin Classics.
- Moore, Timothy (2015). "Music and Gender in Terence’s Hecyra," in Women in the Drama of the Roman Republic, edited by Dorota Dutsch, Sharon James, and David Konstan (University of Wisconsin Press, 2015) 68–87.
- Slater, Niall W. (1988). "The Fictions of Patriarchy in Terence's "Hecyra"". The Classical World, Vol. 81, No. 4 (Mar.–Apr., 1988), pp. 249–260.
