= Codex Vaticanus Latinus 3868 =

Medieval manuscript of ancient Roman comedies

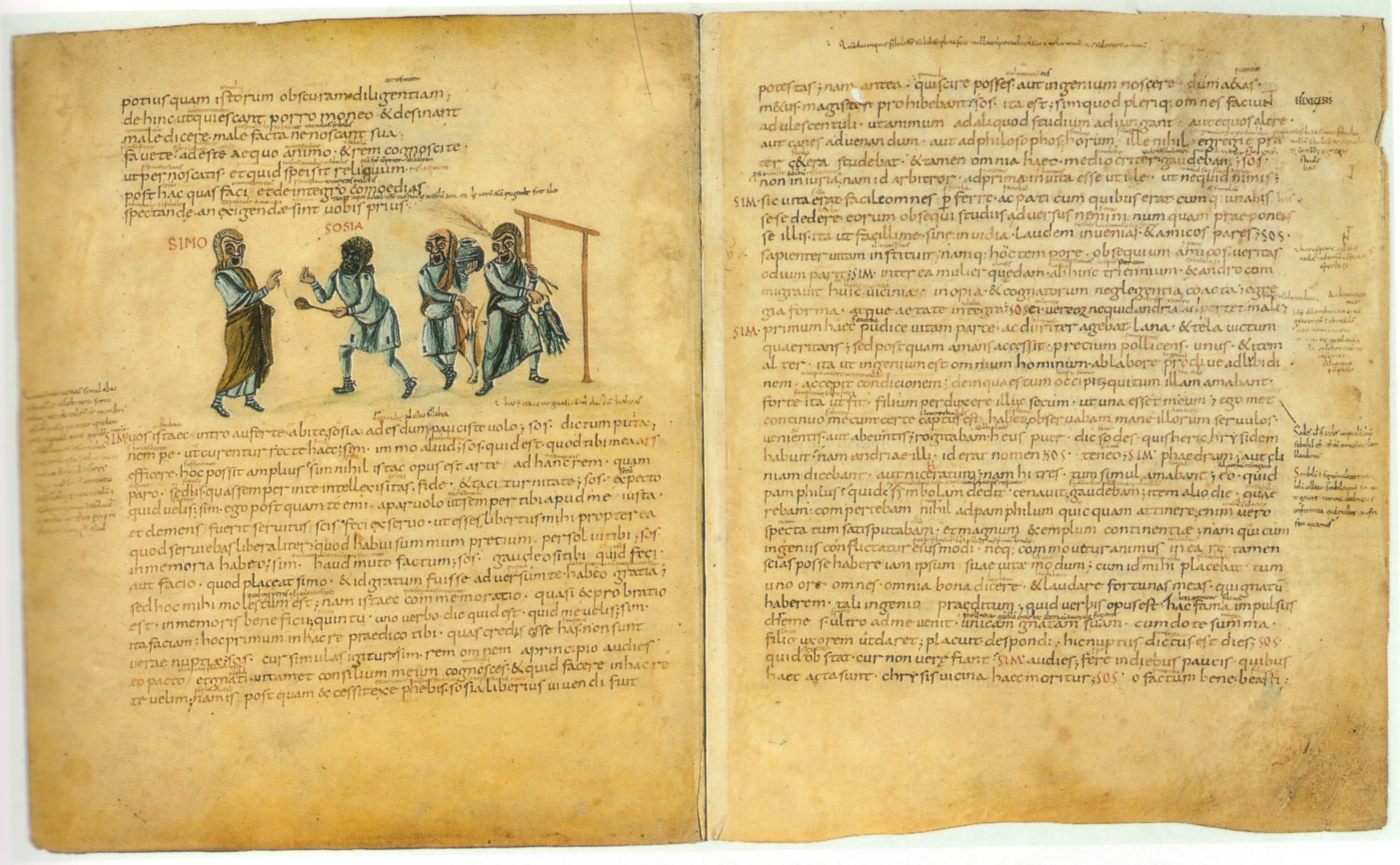
Vat. lat. 3868 (folios 4v/5r)

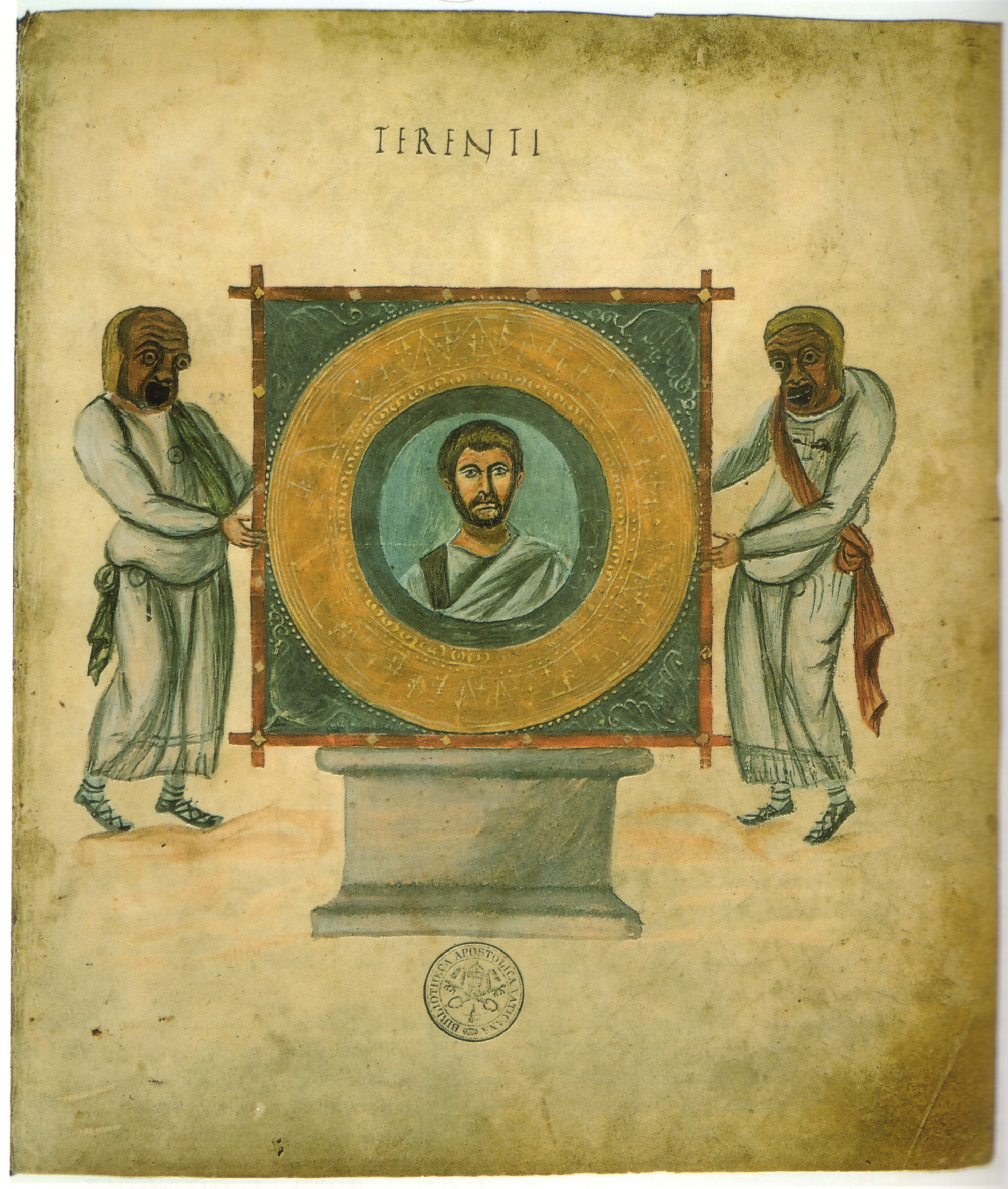
Folio 2 recto

The Vatican Terence (Terentius Vaticanus), or Codex Vaticanus Latinus 3868, is a 9th-century illuminated manuscript of the Latin comedies of Publius Terentius Afer, housed in the Vatican Library. According to art-historical analysis the manuscript was copied from a model of the 3rd century. The manuscript is referred to in the apparatus criticus of modern editions as "C".

== Description ==
The manuscript was made at Corvey in about the year 825 by a scribe named Hrodgarius. The illustrations were made by three artists, one of them was named Adelricus. It contains illustrations of 141 scenes. Bischoff dated the manuscript between 820 and 830.

It is an example of Carolingian art, but the illustrations follow an antique model. The text of the manuscript in English translation was edited by George Colman in 1768. The Latin text was edited by Christoph Stiegemann and Matthias Wemhoff.

The Vatican has digitized the manuscript and added it to its online library, DigiVatLib, as a part of its project to provide free, online access to the Vatican Library's collections of manuscripts and incunabula.

== The archetype of the codex ==
Since the end of the 19th century many scholars tried to estimate the age of the model from which Vaticanus 3868 was copied. According to Weitzmann the latter is a most faithful copy of a late classical original manuscript. On the basis of the art-historical data the original manuscript was dated to the 5th century by Weitzmann, Koehler, and Mütherich. The artist was schooled in the Greco-Asiatic manner. This point of view dominated before World War II.

In the 1960s another more detailed art-historical analysis was made. The pictures of female masks were compared with three female masks dated between the years ca. 242 – ca. 267. The hairstyle of the Terence portrait is close to the one favoured by emperors between the years 238 and 249, suggesting that models from which the codex was copied were made in the 3rd century.
