= Quod licet Iovi, non licet bovi =

Latin phrase

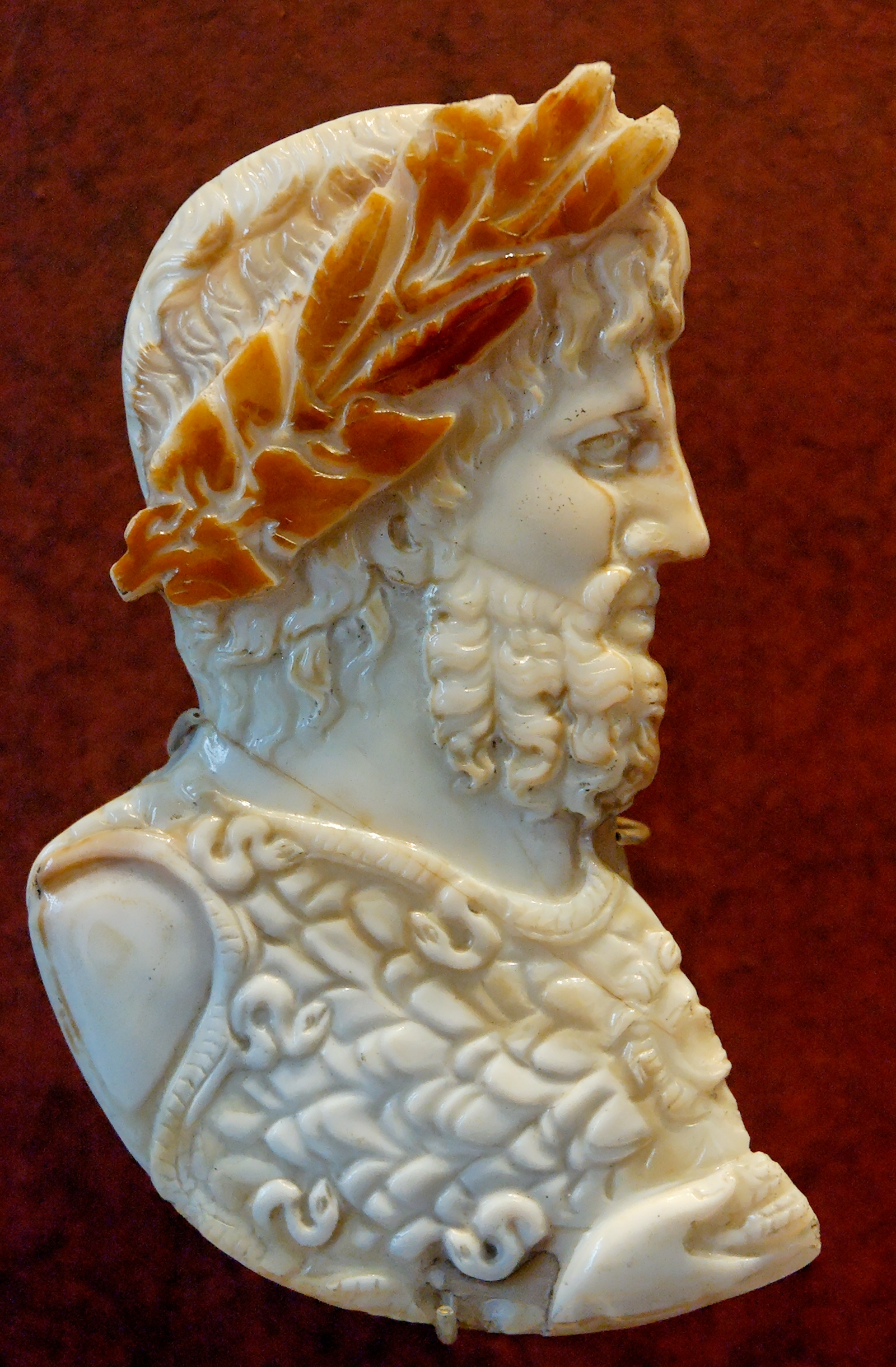
Jupiter's head crowned with laurel and ivy. Sardonyx cameo.

Quod licet Iovi, non licet bovi is a Latin phrase. Its literal meaning is "what is permissible for Jupiter is not permissible for a cow". "Permissible" here refers to Jupiter's abduction of Europa.

The phrase is often translated as "Gods may do what cattle may not". It indicates the existence of a double standard (justifiable or otherwise), and essentially means "what is permitted to one important person or group, is not permitted to everyone."

The origin of the phrase is unknown. It appears in 1784 in a play by Joseph Friedrich von Keppler, 1791 in a libretto by Karl Alexander Herklots and 1826 in the novella Memoirs of a Good-for-Nothing by Joseph Freiherr von Eichendorff. In his play Heauton Timorumenos, Terence, a playwright of the Roman Republic, coined a similar phrase: Aliis si licet, tibi non licet ("to others it is permitted; to you it is not permitted").

Hannah Arendt used the phrase as a title and theme for a well-known profile of Bertolt Brecht.

== See also ==
- List of Latin phrases
