= Heauton Timorumenos =

Ancient Roman play by Terence

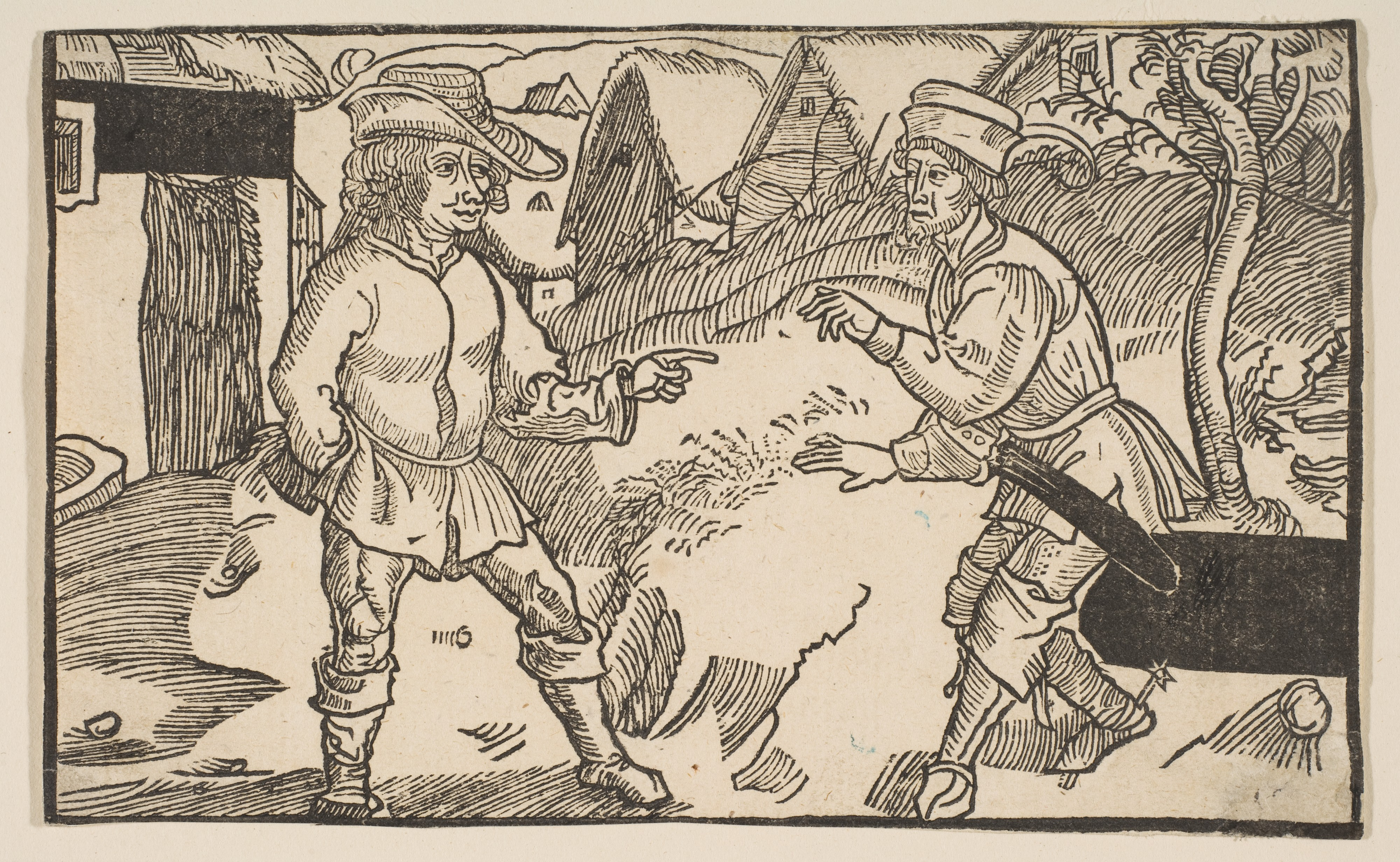
Illustration from a 19th-century edition

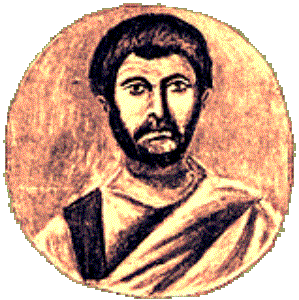
Portrait of the author, Terence

Heauton Timorumenos (Ancient Greek: Ἑαυτὸν τιμωρούμενος, Heauton timōroumenos, The Self-Tormentor) is a play written in Latin by Terence (Latin: Publius Terentius Afer), a dramatist of the Roman Republic, in 163 BC; it was translated wholly or in part from an earlier Greek play by Menander. The play concerns two neighbours, Chremes and Menedemus, whose respective sons, Clitipho and Clinia, are in love with different girls, Bacchis and Antiphila respectively. By a series of deceptions, Chremes' wily slave Syrus dupes Chremes into paying money owed to Bacchis, who is a prostitute. The other girl, Antiphila, is discovered to be Chremes' long-lost daughter, whom he promises in marriage to Clinia.

In his edition, A. J. Brothers calls this "the most neglected of the dramatist's six comedies". He adds: "Yet the Self-Tormentor, for all its occasional imperfections, in many ways shows Terence at his best; the plot is ingenious, complex, fast-moving, and extremely skilfully constructed, its characters are excellently drawn, and the whole is full of delightful dramatic irony. It deserves to be better known."

Heauton Timorumenos was either Terence's second play or his third; it is not clear which. In the prologue, Terence says he has altered the plot of the Greek play on which it is based by making it "double". However, due to the scant survival of Menander's play of the same name, there is no simple way to judge how much of Terence's version is translation and how much is invention.

The play is set in a village in the countryside of Attica. On the stage are two houses, one belonging to Chremes, and the other to his neighbour Menedemus. All the action takes place in the street in front of the houses.

The play is remembered for its famous line homo sum, humani nil a me alienum puto ("I am human, nothing that is human is alien to me") — for more detail on which, see the section § Homo sum, humani below.

== Characters ==
- Menedemus – an Athenian gentleman, newly moved to the countryside, father of Clinia
- Chremes – Menedemus's neighbour, father of Clitipho
- Clinia – Menedemus's estranged son, in love with Antiphila
- Clitipho – Chremes' son and a friend of Clinia, in love with Bacchis
- Syrus – Chremes' slave
- Dromo – Menedemus's slave
- Antiphila – a girl raised by a weaveress, and beloved of Clinia
- Bacchis – a wealthy courtesan, beloved of Clitipho
- Sostrata – Chremes' wife
- Phrygia – Bacchis's slave
- Canthara – a nurse, servant of Sostrata

== Plot ==
=== Prologue ===
The prologue serves to defend Terence's method of playwriting. He asks the audience to judge the play by its merits, rather than by the opinions of critics.

=== Act one ===
Menedemus, a wealthy farmer, explains to his neighbour Chremes why he is punishing himself by working hard in his fields. Menedemus explains that he had reproached his son Clinia for his having a relationship with a penniless girl, and had held up his own youth as a soldier as a virtuous contrast. Clinia, shamed, has taken Menedemus more literally than he intended and has gone to live as a soldier in the East. By coincidence, immediately after Menedemus exits, Chremes encounters his own son, Clitipho with Clinia, who has returned from the East. Clitipho begs Chremes not to tell Menedemus, as Clinia is still afraid of his father's wrath. Chremes agrees for the moment but adds that a father's duty is to be severe. Once alone, Clitipho swears he will never be a tyrant in the mould of his father.

=== Act two ===
Clinia has sent for his lover, Antiphila, who has been in mourning for the old weaving-woman who brought her up. Antiphila arrives accompanied by Bacchis, the wealthy courtesan with whom Clitipho is in love. Clitipho is angered that his slave, Syrus, has presumed to invite his mistress to his father's house, as his father will disapprove of her. Syrus conceives a ruse for the meantime where Bacchis will pose as Clinia's mistress and Antiphila as her servant. The women arrive; Bacchis praises Antiphila for her virtue and beauty but warns that beauty and men's attention fade, and that she ought to find a man to love who will be constant for life. They meet Clinia and the young lovers are overcome with joy at the reunion.

=== Act three ===
Next morning, Chremes informs Menedemus that his son has returned, but believing that Bacchis is Clinia's mistress, he warns Menedemus against welcoming him home, explaining that Clinia is now in love with a spendthrift mistress. He advises Menedemus to allow Syrus to trick him out of some money, rather than showing himself to be a soft touch by simply giving it. When Chremes returns to his house, he suggests to Syrus that he ought to find some trick to get the money out of Menedemus; it is the duty of slaves sometimes, he says, to deceive their masters. On entering the house, he is surprised to find Clitipho embracing Bacchis, and tells him off. Syrus agrees to help Chremes, but only because it dovetails with his own scheme directed against Chremes. Syrus tells Chremes that Antiphila had been pawned to Bacchis by the old weaveress in return for a loan, and that Bacchis is willing to release her for 1000 drachmas (10 minae); he advises Chremes to tell Menedemus to buy Antiphila as she is a good bargain: a captive from Caria whose friends will pay handsomely for her release. Chremes thinks it unlikely that Menedemus will go for this, but Syrus assures him that the plan will still be effective even if Menedemus refuses.

=== Act four ===
Sostrata, Chremes' wife, has discovered, by way of a ring that Antiphila has given to her for safekeeping while she bathes, that Antiphila is her long-lost daughter whom she had given away to be exposed on Chremes' direction. Syrus realizes that his plan to get Menedemus to buy Antiphila cannot now work, as she is not a slave. He withdraws to consider a better plan. Clinia, on the other hand, is overjoyed because Antiphila is now revealed to be a suitable wife for him, so he will be able to abandon the deception. But Syrus says that while Clinia may tell his father the truth, he must keep up the pretense to Chremes for a while longer because Clitipho will be in trouble if Chremes discovers that Bacchis is Clitipho's mistress. When Clinia objects that Chremes will not allow him to marry his daughter while he believes Bacchis is Clinia's lover, Syrus persuades him to maintain the ruse for a day to give Syrus the time to get Bacchis's money. Syrus then tells Bacchis, who is threatening to expose him, to go to Menedemus' house where she will get paid. Syrus then tricks Chremes by telling him the truth: he tells him that Clinia has told his father that Bacchis is Clitipho's mistress and that Clinia himself wishes to marry Antiphila. Syrus advises Chremes that he should pretend to go along with this 'trick' and offer to give Clinia dowry money. But Chremes refuses to do this as it would be dishonourable. Syrus therefore persuades him that he himself should pay the money to release Antiphila, and send Clitipho to pay it to her. Chremes follows this advice and hands the money to Clitipho, to Clitipho's astonishment and delight. Meanwhile, Menedemus tells Chremes that Clinia wishes to marry Antiphila. But Chremes warns Menedemus that what Clinia said is just a trick to try to get money to pay for Bacchis. He advises Menedemus that he should pretend to go along with Clinia's statement and tell Clinia that the marriage had been agreed.

=== Act five ===
A short time later Menedemus comes and tells Chremes that he has been a fool. He saw Clitipho go into a bedroom with Bacchis and he now knows that Clinia was telling the truth. Chremes is in despair as he realises that Bacchis and all her attendants will quickly ruin him. Menedemus repeats the advice that Chremes gave to him at the start of the play: he should make his son abide by his wishes. Chremes gives his assent to the match between Clinia and Antiphila, and offers a dowry of two talents. But he asks Menedemus to help save his son by pretending that he, Chremes, is giving away all his estate to make a sufficient dowry. Clitipho is distraught when he hears this news, but his father tells him he would rather have his estate be thus disposed of than go to Bacchis by way of his heir. Syrus prompts Clitipho to ask his mother if he is really her son. The parents quarrel. Sostrata and Menedemus beg Chremes not to treat his son so harshly and Chremes relents, but on the condition that Clitipho give up Bacchis and take a different wife. Clitipho, preferring a full stomach to passion, agrees to marry a respectable girl. In the last lines of the play, Clitipho persuades Chremes to pardon Syrus for the trick he played on him.

== Metrical scheme ==
Terence uses a variety of metres in this play. In terms of the number of lines the proportions are as follows:

- iambic senarii: 54% (this metre was unaccompanied)

In this play, iambic senarii are used for setting the scene and giving background details; for the conversations between the old men; and for narrative. There are also some moments, such as when Chremes realises he has been duped, or when Antiphila recognises Clinia, when the music stops to express surprise.

- trochaic septenarii: 26%

Trochaic septenarii are usually found at the end of a metrical section and are frequently used at moments when the action of the play moves on to a new phase.

- iambic octonarii: 13%

Iambic octonarii are used by the boys and by Syrus to express their anxieties. This metre is also used when Sostrata recognises her long-lost daughter's ring.

- iambic septenarii: 5%

Iambic septenarii are often associated with courtesans, as with Bacchis's second speech. They are also used here when Clinia expresses his joy at the prospect of marrying Antiphila.

- trochaic octonarii: 1%
- iambic quaternarii: 0.4%

Since a senarius is shorter than a septenarius, in terms of the number of metrical elements, in fact only 48% of the play was unaccompanied, and the rest was sung to the sound of tibiae or reed pipes.

=== Prologue ===
- Iambic senarii (lines 1–52) (49 lines)

Terence defends himself against the criticisms of an older poet, and asks the audience to give his play a fair hearing.

=== The scene is set ===
- Act 1.1 (53–174): iambic senarii (122 lines)

Chremes visits his neighbour Menedemus to ask why he spends the whole of every day working in the fields. Menedemus explains that he regrets having encouraged his son Clinia to go abroad to fight. He misses him dreadfully and is punishing himself by hard labour.

- Act 1.2 (175–180): mixed iambic-trochaic (7 lines)

Returning to his own house Chremes meets his son Clitipho, who tells him that Clinia has returned from abroad and is hiding in their house.

- Act 1.2–2.2 (181–241): iambic octonarii (60 lines)

After his father has gone in, Clitipho complains about the strictness of fathers. – Clinia comes outside and expresses his anxiety about his girlfriend Antiphila.

- Act 2.3 (242–256): trochaic septenarii (15 lines)

Chremes' slave Syrus and Menedemus's slave Dromo appear. Syrus reports that Antiphila is on her way together with some other women.

=== Syrus's first deception ===
- Act 2.3 (257–264): iambic octonarii (8 lines)

Clinia anxiously bewails his situation to Syrus, who reassures him that Antiphila still loves him.

- Act 2.3 (265–311): iambic senarii (47 lines)

Syrus narrates what happened when he and Dromo reached Antiphila's house and how he found Antiphila was still being faithful.

- Act 2.3 (312–339): trochaic septenarii (28 lines)

Clitipho now grows alarmed to hear that his own girlfriend Bacchis is in the group coming to his father's house. Syrus assures him that it is all part of a plan that he has devised. They will pretend that Bacchis is Clinia's girlfriend, and that Antiphila is Bacchis's maid.

=== The girls arrive ===
- Act 2.3 (340–380): iambic senarii (41 lines)

To persuade Clitipho to go along with his plan, Syrus pretends to be going to tell the women to go back again. Clitipho, desperate to see Bacchis, gives in and calls him back. As the women approach, Syrus tells Clitipho to make himself scarce.

- Act 2.4 (381–397): trochaic septenarii (17 lines)

The courtesan Bacchis enters chatting with the young Antiphila.

- Act 2.4 (398–404): iambic octonarii (7 lines)

Clinia blurts out how much he has missed Antiphila.

- Act 2.4 (405–409): iambic senarii (5 lines)

Antiphila starts to faint from surprise. Clinia hugs her. They go inside.
(Some time passes until daybreak.)

=== Syrus's second deception ===
- Act 3.1–3.2 (410–561): iambic senarii (152 lines)

Next morning Chremes goes to Menedemus's house and gives him the good news that his son has returned; but he advises him to say nothing for the time being. He suggests that Menedemus should allow Syrus to trick him out of 20 minae to avoid giving Clinia the impression that he is a soft touch who will support his every whim. On returning to his own house Chremes suggests to Syrus that he ought to perform some trick to get Menedemus to cough up the money that Clinia needs to pay for Bacchis.

- Act 3.3 (562–588): mixed iambic/trochaic (29 lines)

Chremes comes out of the house scolding Clitipho, whom he has caught embracing Bacchis. Syrus adds his own reproaches and instructs Clitipho to make himself scarce.

- Act 3.3. (589–590): iambic senarii (2 lines)

Clitipho departs in a surly mood.

- Act 3.3 (591–613): trochaic septenarii (23 lines)

Syrus explains his plan to Chremes. He tells him that Bacchis is holding Antiphila as a pledge against a debt of 1000 drachmas incurred by Antiphila's recently deceased mother, a Corinthian woman; Bacchis is willing to hand over Antiphila if the money is repaid. Syrus suggests he can persuade Menedemus to pay the money since he will tell Menedemus that Antiphila is a captive from Caria, and Menedemus will be able resell her for a profit. Chremes is doubtful, but Syrus boasts that even if Menedemus refuses to pay, the plan will still work.

=== Sostrata recognises her daughter ===
- Act 4.1 (614–622): iambic octonarii (9 lines)

Chremes' wife Sostrata comes out holding a ring which she says proves that Antiphila is her own daughter who was given away at birth to a Corinthian woman. Her old nurse confirms it is the same ring.

- Act 4.1 (623–667): trochaic septenarii (45 lines)

Seeing Chremes, Sostrata confesses that she failed to carry out his orders to expose the baby at that time and she begs his forgiveness. Syrus, overhearing them, immediately realises that the story is true and that his plan to get Menedemus to pay for Antiphila will no longer work.

=== Syrus thinks of a new plan ===
- Act 4.2 (668–678): iambic octonarii (10 lines)

Left alone on stage, Syrus expresses his anxiety. He desperately needs a new plan. Suddenly he thinks of one.

- Act 4.3 (679–707): iambic septenarii (29 lines)

Clinia now comes out singing of his happiness that the way is clear for him to marry Antiphila. Syrus tells him that he must take Bacchis with him when he goes; but he is welcome to tell his father the truth.

- Act 4.3 (708): iambic senarius (1 line)

In surprise, Clinia asks Syrus to explain.

- Act 4.3 (709–722): trochaic septenarii (14 lines)

Syrus explains that for his plan to work Chremes must continue to think that Bacchis is Clinia's girlfriend until he pays the money, otherwise his friend Clitipho will be left without a girlfriend.

=== Syrus's third deception ===
- Act 4.4 (723–748): iambic septenarii (26 lines)

Bacchis comes out, full of annoyance that she has not yet been paid. In order to put pressure on Syrus, she orders her slave girl Phrygia to run with a message to the house of a certain soldier who has been wooing her. Syrus stops her and assures her that she will receive the money, but first she and all her maids must transfer to Menedemus's house. He knocks on Menedemus's door and orders the dull-witted Dromo to go and fetch all the maids and their belongings. They all go into Menedemus's house except Syrus.

- Act 4.5–4.8 (749–873): iambic senarii (126 lines)

Chremes comes outside, delighted that the expensive Bacchis has moved to Menedemus's house. Syrus now tells him that Clinia has told Menedemus that Bacchis is Clitipho's girlfriend, and that he himself wants to marry Antiphila. In this way, says Syrus, Clinia hopes to get money from Chremes; Syrus suggests Chremes should pretend to go along with this idea temporarily. But (as Syrus knew he would) Chremes refuses to take part in any pretence and tells Syrus to try to get the money some other way. Syrus therefore suggests that Chremes should pay for Antiphila's release himself, and that it would be best to send Clitipho as the go-between. Chremes agrees and he goes inside to fetch the money.
– Clitipho arrives back from his walk, still annoyed. Syrus tells him that Bacchis is now in Menedemus's house. Clitipho is at first dismayed, but then, to his astonishment, Chremes comes out and gives him money to take to pay Bacchis. Syrus and Clitipho depart to Menedemus's.
– Left on his own, Chremes wonders how much money he will need to pay Antiphila's dowry when she gets married.
– Now Menedemus comes out and tells Chremes that Clinia wants to marry Antiphila. But Chremes warns him that it is all a trick. He suggests Menedemus should pretend to go along with the trick and tell Clinia that the engagement has been agreed on. Each returns to his own house.

- Act 5.1 (874–907): trochaic septenarii (34 lines)

Some time later Menedemus comes out again, telling himself that he has been a fool, but that Chremes has been an even greater one. Meanwhile Chremes also comes out, scolding his wife for talking so much about her new daughter. Menedemus tells him that Clinia didn't ask for any money, but that Clitipho went into a back bedroom with Bacchis and closed the door.

=== Chremes punishes Clitipho ===
- Act 5.1 (908–939): iambic senarii (32 lines)

Suddenly the music stops as Chremes realises that he has been duped. He is horrified at the thought of the expense that Bacchis and all her troupe of maids are going to cause him. As to Antiphila's marriage, he agrees to it, and promises a dowry of two talents. But to punish Clitipho, he requests Menedemus to tell Clitipho that Chremes has offered his whole fortune as a dowry, meaning that Clitipho will inherit none of it.

- Act 5.2 (940–979): trochaic septenarii (40 lines)

Clitipho comes out, dismayed that his father has acted in this way. Chremes tells him that he is not annoyed with Clitipho or Syrus, but he has acted to prevent Bacchis squandering all his fortune. He goes inside.

=== All is forgiven ===
- Act 5.2 (980–999): iambic octonarii (21 lines)

Clitipho turns to Syrus and miserably asks what he is to do. Syrus hurriedly devises a new plan. He tells Clitipho that it seems that he can't really be Chremes's true son but only adopted. Clitipho agrees and goes inside to talk to his mother. Syrus congratulates himself on his clever plan.

- Act 5.2 (1000–1002): iambic septenarii (3 lines)

Suddenly Syrus sees Chremes coming out, and, unsure of Chremes' mood, he escapes to Menedemus's house.

- Act 5.3 (1003–1023): mostly iambic octonarii, some trochaic septenarii (17 lines)

Chremes and Sostrata come out, having a row. Each calls the other stupid. Chremes says that Clitipho is certainly her son since they behave the same way.

- Act 5.4–5.5 (1024–1067): trochaic septenarii (44 lines)

Clitipho begs his mother to tell him if he is really her son. Sostrata reassures him but Chremes continues to speak angrily to Clitipho and call him all sorts of names. – Now Menedemus comes out and begs Chremes to forgive Clitipho. Chremes eventually agrees, but one condition: Clitipho must get married at once to a suitable girl. Clitipho is forced to agree and names one he is prepared to marry. Before the play ends Clitipho persuades Chremes also to forgive Syrus.

== Homo sum, humani ==
The most famous line in the play is line 77:

homo sum: humani nil a me alienum puto.

It means "I am human, nothing that is human is alien to me".

The metre of the line is an iambic senarius. To be read metrically, it requires the elisions homo s(um) humani and m(e) alienum.

The line was quoted twice by Cicero (Leg. 1.33 and Off. 1.29–30) and later by Seneca and many other writers. St Augustine (Epist. 155.14) recounts that he had heard that when it was spoken "whole theatres burst into applause (theatra tota ... applausisse)".

In its original context it is a defensive reply by the busybody old man Chremes to his neighbour Menedemus, who says "Have you got so much free time as to concern yourself with other people's affairs which have nothing to do with you?", to which Chremes replies, "I'm a man: nothing human is not my concern". In later centuries, it received a much wider interpretation:

Some would see in it, as Michel de Montaigne did, a man's confession of his emotional and spiritual weakness. Others, like John of Salisbury, perceive an expression of Christian charity. Others again make it a disavowal of intolerance and prudery in regard to human behaviour. Most would say that it had to do with being 'humane' in some very positive sense of this much used word...

It is pronounced by the character Cremes to justify his meddling. Nevertheless, the quote has remained for posterity as a justification of what human behavior should be. The phrase is often linked with pride, yet it usually reflects humility and an acknowledgment of personal fallibility, much like the sayings "to err is human" and "let him who is without sin cast the first stone".

Among English authors who quoted it was Henry Fielding in Tom Jones (1749, Book XV, ch. VIII) who applies the quotation to his hero: “He was one who could truly say with him in Terence, Homo sum, humani nihil a me alienum puto.”

A shortened version of the line, HVMANI NIHIL ALIENVM, is used as the motto of various institutions, such as the Law Society of Scotland and the Australian Academy of the Humanities and Wolfson College, Oxford.

Michel Montaigne had it written on one of the beams in the ceiling of the famous third-floor library in his tower where he wrote the Essays.

Karl Marx considered this passage a personal maxim.

In the 1880 novel The Brothers Karamazov by Fyodor Dostoevsky, a character references the line.

== Nam deteriores omnes ==
A less well known line from the play (line 483) is quoted as the epigraph to Chapter 25 of George Eliot's novel Daniel Deronda:

Nam deteriores omnes sumus licentiae, saith Terence; or, as a more familiar tongue might deliver it, 'As you like' is a bad finger-post.

Terence's line means "For all of us are worse for licence" ("licence" here used in the sense of "free rein to do as we like").

== In literature and culture ==
A poem in Charles Baudelaire's Les Fleurs du mal is named for Terence's play.

== See also ==
- Quod licet Iovi, non licet bovi
- Lucius Ambivius Turpio
