= Lucius Ambivius Turpio =

Lucius Ambivius Turpio (often referred to simply as "Turpio") was an actor, stage manager, patron, promoter and entrepreneur in ancient Rome around the time of the playwright Terence, that is, around the 2nd century BC. Formerly working with the playwright Caecilius Statius, and already known as a promoter of contemporary comic writers, Turpio moved on to serve as the producer and lead actor in most if not all of Terence's plays.

== Career ==
In some ways, Turpio served as Terence's metatheatrical mouthpiece on stage. In several of his plays Terence began with a prologue to the audience explaining his method of playwriting, ostensibly spoken by an actor in a manner suggesting a close relationship with the playwright. In at least two plays—Heauton Timorumenos (The Self-Tormentor) and Hecyra (The Mother-in-Law)—this speaker in the prologue explicitly identifies himself as Turpio.

The general scholarly opinion is that it was Turpio who purchased all of Terence's pieces after they were put up for sale, and his acting troupe that was the primary performer of most of Terence's works.
