= Didascaliae =

Compilation of production notices for Roman theatre works

Didascaliae are a compilation of production notices for several stage works of ancient Rome. This incomplete record was probably compiled some time around the 1st century BC, and contains notes on the Stichus and Pseudolus of Plautus (in Manuscript A) and all the plays of Terence (in the manuscript and in the commentary by Aelius Donatus), after which they were sometimes called Didascaliae Terentianae. The notes contain information about the first performance of the works, games that were played there, the plays' directors and producers (such as Lucius Ambivius Turpio), musical composers, the nature of the musical score, the Roman consuls that year, etcetera. In some cases, details about subsequent revivals are also preserved.
