= Terence =

Roman comic playwright (c. 195/185 BC–c.159 BC

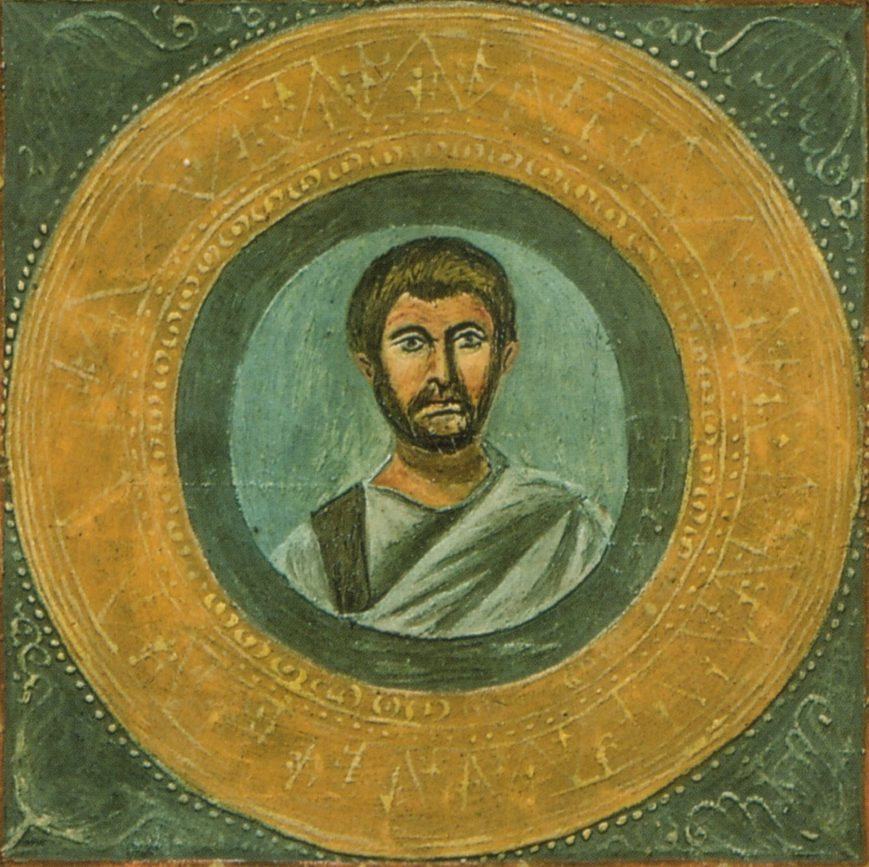
- Terence, 9th-century illustration, possibly copied from 3rd-century original
- Born: Publius Terentius Afer c. 195/185 BC
- Died: c. 159? BC
- Occupation: Playwright
- Writing career
- Language: Latin Berbers
- Years active: 166–160 BC
- Period: Roman Republic
- Genre: Fabula palliata

Publius Terentius Afer (/təˈrɛnʃiəs, -ʃəs/; c. 195/185 – c. 159 BC), better known in English as Terence (/ˈtɛrəns/), was a playwright during the Roman Republic. He was the author of six comedies based on Greek originals by Menander or Apollodorus of Carystus. All six of Terence's plays survive complete and were originally produced between 166 and 160 BC.

According to ancient authors, Terence was born in Carthage and was brought to Rome as a slave, where he gained an education and his freedom; around the age of 25, Terence is said to have made a voyage to the east in search of inspiration for his plays, where he died either of disease in Greece, or by shipwreck on the return voyage. However, Terence's traditional biography is often thought to consist of speculation by ancient scholars who lived too long after Terence to have access to reliable facts about his life.

Terence's plays quickly became standard school texts. He ultimately secured a place as one of the four authors taught to all grammar pupils in the Western Roman Empire, and retained a central place in the European school curriculum until the 19th century, exercising a formative influence on authors such as William Shakespeare and Molière.

== Life and career ==
The manuscripts of Terence's plays contain didascaliae, or production notices, recording the dates, occasions, and personnel of early productions of the plays, and identifying the author of the Greek original. Other traditional information about the life of Terence derives from the Vita Terenti, a biography preserved in Aelius Donatus' commentary, and attributed by him to Suetonius. However, it is not likely that Terence's contemporaries would have considered a dramatist important enough to write down his biography for posterity, and the narrative given by Suetonius' sources is often construed as conjecture based on the play texts and didascaliae.

=== Conditions of performance ===
In the 2nd century BC, plays were regular features of four annual Roman festivals: the Ludi Romani (September), the Ludi Plebeii (November), the Ludi Apollinares (July), and the Ludi Megalenses (April); plays would also be staged at votive games, triumphs, and the more elaborate aristocratic funerals. Because the Roman calendar ran some two and a half months ahead of the Sun in the 160s, Terence's plays that premiered at the Megalensia, though officially scheduled in April, would actually have premiered in late January.

There was no permanent theatre in Rome until the construction of the Theatre of Pompey in 55 BC, and Terence's plays would have been performed on temporary wooden stages constructed for the occasion. The limited space available would probably have accommodated an audience of less than 2,000 persons at a given performance. Admission was free to the entire population, seemingly on a first-come-first-served basis, except for the reservation of seats for members of the Senate after 194 BC; descriptions of 2nd century theatre audiences refer to the presence of women, children, slaves, and the urban poor.

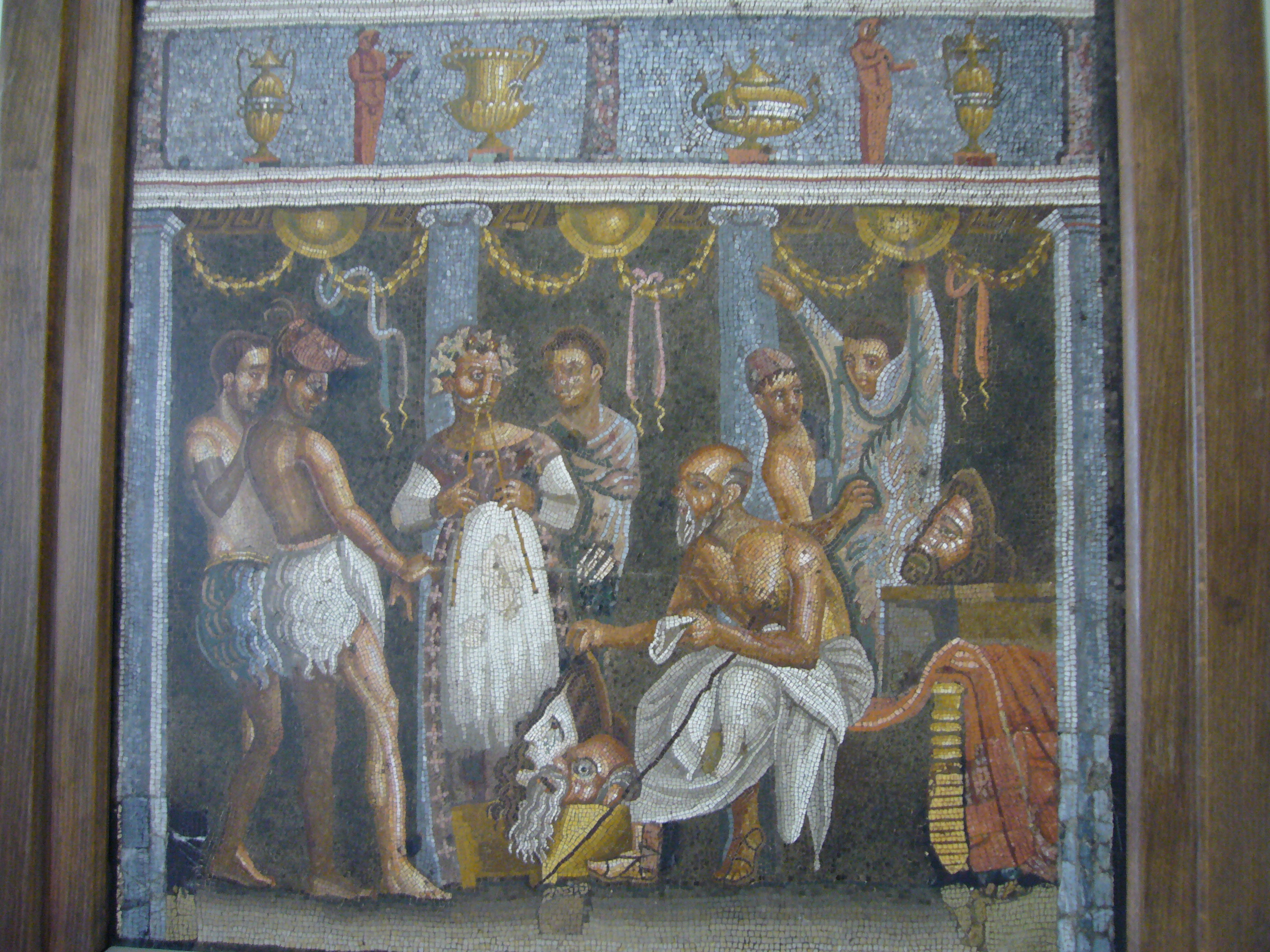
Mosaic from the House of the Tragic Poet depicting preparations for a Greek play

In Greek New Comedy, from which the Roman comic tradition derived, actors wore masks which were conventionally associated with stock character types. Ancient authors make conflicting statements on whether Roman actors also wore masks in the time of Terence. For a time, Christian Hoffer's 1877 dissertation On the Use of Masks in Publius Terentius' Comedies won universal acceptance for the view that masks were not worn at the original performances of the plays of Terence. However, most more recent authorities consider it highly likely that Roman actors of Terence's time did wear masks when performing this kind of play, and "hard to believe" or even "inconceivable" that they did not. Donatus states that the actors wore masks in the original productions of the Eunuchus and the Adelphoe.

=== The didascaliae ===
According to the didascaliae, each of Terence's plays was originally produced by the acting company of Lucius Ambivius Turpio, and musical accompaniment for each of the plays was provided by a tibicen named Flaccus, a slave in the service of a certain Claudius. The traditional and generally accepted chronology of the plays established according to the didascaliae is as follows:

- 166 BC: Andria at the Ludi Megalenses
- 165 BC: abortive production of Hecyra at the Ludi Megalenses
- 163 BC: Heauton timorumenos at the Ludi Megalenses
- 161 BC: Eunuchus at the Ludi Megalenses; Phormio at the Ludi Romani
- 160 BC: Adelphoe, and second abortive production of Hecyra, at the funeral games of Aemilius Paullus; third (and successful) production of Hecyra at the Ludi Romani

The didascalia for each play also identifies its position in the corpus by chronological order. The didascaliae state that Eunuchus was the second play (facta II), and Heauton timorumenos was the third (facta III), testimony seemingly contradicted by the dates of production, as well as by Donatus' statement that the Eunuchus was "published third" (edita tertium). Some scholars have explained the discrepancy by positing an unsuccessful production of Eunuchus in 165 or 164 BC, or by interpreting the numbering in reference to the order of composition rather than the order of production. The didascalic numbering, seemingly discounting the unsuccessful productions of Hecyra, reckons it the fifth play.

The didascaliae also appear to record some information about revival performances at least as late as the 140s. Patrick Tansey has argued that the didascalia to Phormio in the codex Bembinus contains garbled names of the consuls in 106 BC, which would be the last attested production of Terence before the Renaissance, though the consuls of 141 BC had similar names.

=== The prologues ===
The Greek plays which provided the Roman comedians with their material typically had a prologue which either preceded the play, or interrupted the first act after one or two scenes. In the plays of Plautus, the prologue usually, but not invariably, provides exposition of the plot; Terence abandons the traditional expository function of the prologue entirely and uses it to provide a different kind of entertainment centring on replies to criticism of his work.

Terence particularly refers the "slanders" he has suffered to a certain "old" and "spiteful" poet. Because Terence says this man was the translator of Menander's Phasma and Thesaurus (Eu. 9–10), Donatus (or an earlier commentator from whom Donatus gleaned this information) was able to identify him as Luscius Lanuvinus, although no names are used in the prologues. Nothing survives of Luscius' work save two lines of the Thesaurus quoted by Donatus, nor is anything known about Luscius independently of Terence's prologues except that Volcacius Sedigitus rated Luscius the ninth-best Latin comic poet (and Terence the sixth-best). Terence's description of Luscius as "old" may refer to a style of play-writing that Terence considered old-fashioned rather than to advanced age. Terence's judgement of Luscius' work is that "by translating them well and writing them badly, he has made good Greek plays into Latin ones that aren't good" (Eu. 7–8), and that Luscius' theatrical successes were due more to the efforts of the actors than of the author. (Ph. 9–11)

=== Suetonian biography ===
According to Suetonius, Terence was born in Carthage. He came to Rome as a slave in the household of an otherwise unknown senator named P. Terentius Lucanus, who educated and freed him because of his talent and good looks. Terence then took the nomen "Terentius" from his patron. Possibly winning noblemen's favour by his youthful beauty, Terence became a member of the so-called Scipionic Circle.

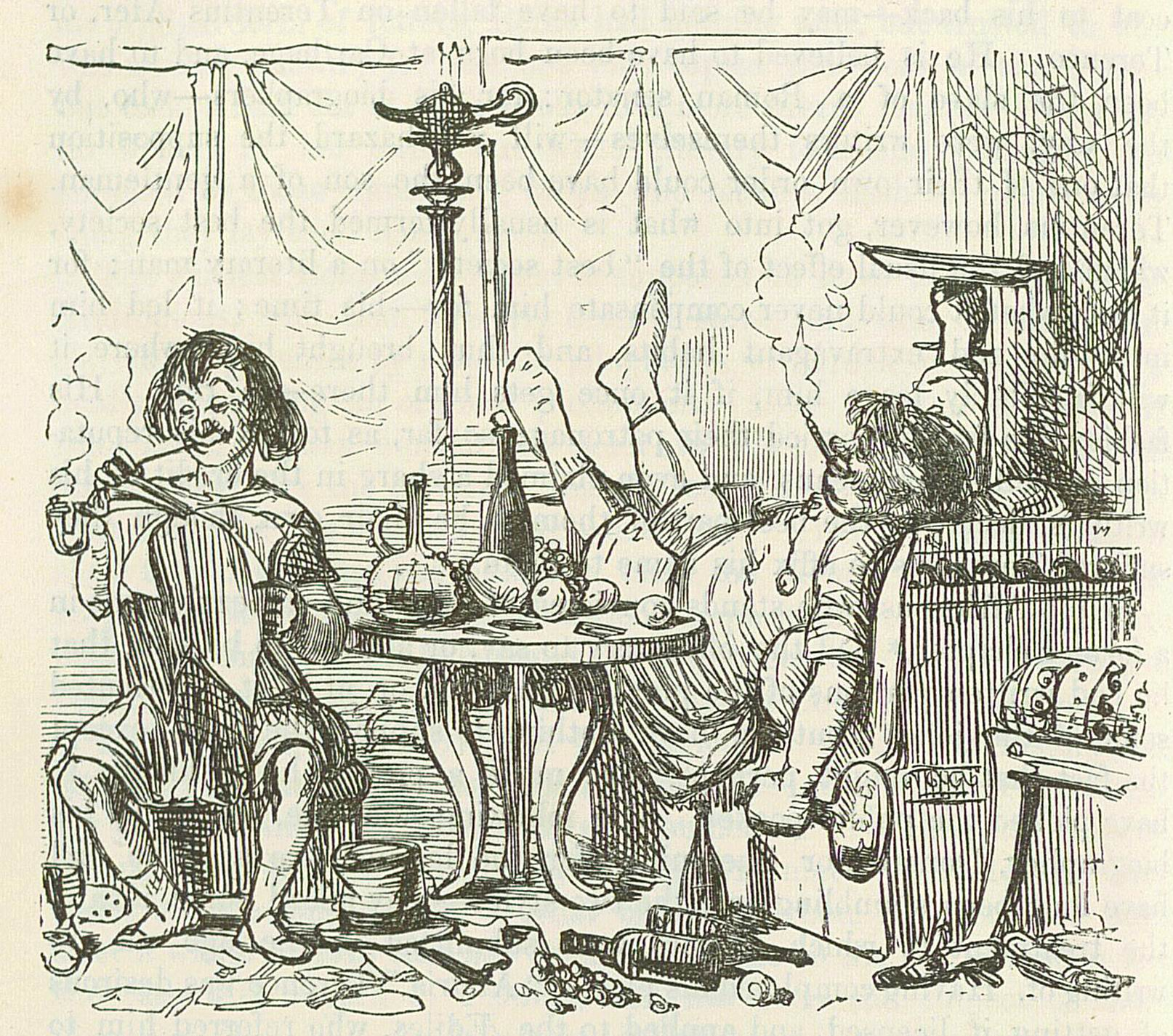
Humorous engraving by John Leech of Terence reading the Andria to Caecilius

When Terence offered his first play, Andria, to the aediles, they bade him first read it to Caecilius. Terence, shabbily dressed, went to the older poet's house when he was dining, and when Caecilius had heard only a few lines, he invited the young man to join him for the meal. The historicity of this meeting has been doubted on the grounds that it is improbable Terence, with his aristocratic patrons, would have been unable to dress himself decently for such an important interview; a suspiciously similar story is told about the tragedians Accius and Pacuvius; and Jerome's statement that Caecilius died the year after Ennius implies that Caecilius died two years before Andria was produced. However, Thomas Carney argues that Jerome's dating of Caecilius' death is not above suspicion, and besides, a delay of several years between this meeting and production is entirely plausible, as Caecilius may have been impressed by the novice playwright's work even while the discussion showed Terence the need for revision. R. C. Flickinger argues that the reported state of Terence's clothing shows that he had not yet become acquainted with his rich and influential patrons at the time of this meeting, and it was precisely Caecilius' death shortly thereafter, and the consequent loss of his support, which caused a two-year delay in production.

All six of Terence's plays pleased the people; the Eunuchus earned 8,000 nummi, the highest price that had ever been paid for a comedy at Rome, and was acted twice in the same day. Donatus, who appears to understand that Terence himself received this entire amount, interprets the price that Suetonius says was paid for the Eunuchus as 8,000 sesterces. However, Dwora Gilula argues that the term nummus, inscribed on the title page in 161 BC, would refer to a denarius, a coin containing a much larger quantity of silver, so that the price paid for the Eunuchus was really 32,000 sesterces.

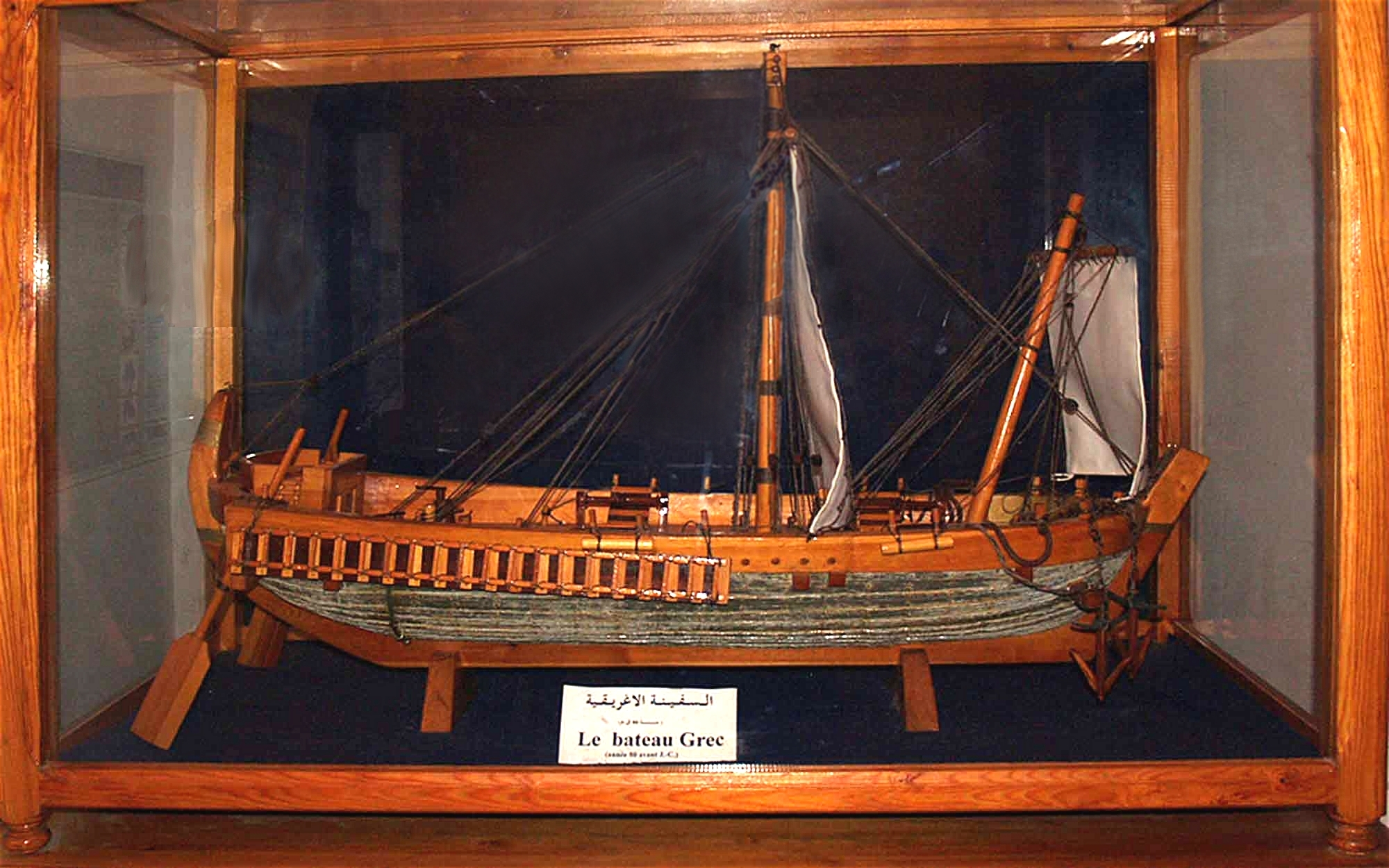
Model of a Greek ship of the 1st century BC, reconstructed from the Mahdia shipwreck

When he was about the age of 25 (or, according to some manuscripts, 35), Terence travelled to Greece or Asia and never returned. Suetonius' sources disagree about the motive and destination of Terence's voyage, as well as about whether he died of illness in Greece, or died by shipwreck on the return voyage. Suetonius places Terence's death "in the consulship of Gnaeus Cornelius Dolabella and Marcus Fulvius Nobilior," i.e., in 159 BC. It is possible that the fateful voyage to Greece was a speculative explanation of why he wrote so few plays inferred from Terence's complaint in Eunuchus 41–3 about the limited materials at his disposal.

As transmitted in the manuscript tradition, the Vita attributes the claim to Q. Cosconius that Terence died by shipwreck while returning from Greece "cum C et VIII fabulis conversis a Menandro," an expression interpreted by some to refer to 108 new plays that Terence had adapted from Menander, but by Carney as "108 stories dramatised by Menander," who is credited with having written exactly this number of plays. If this number refers to new Terentian plays, it is improbable that Terence worked at such a rate after having previously finished less than one play a year, and some editors delete the number, supposing that the numeral CVIII is simply a double copying of the preposition CVM, subsequently rationalised as a number.

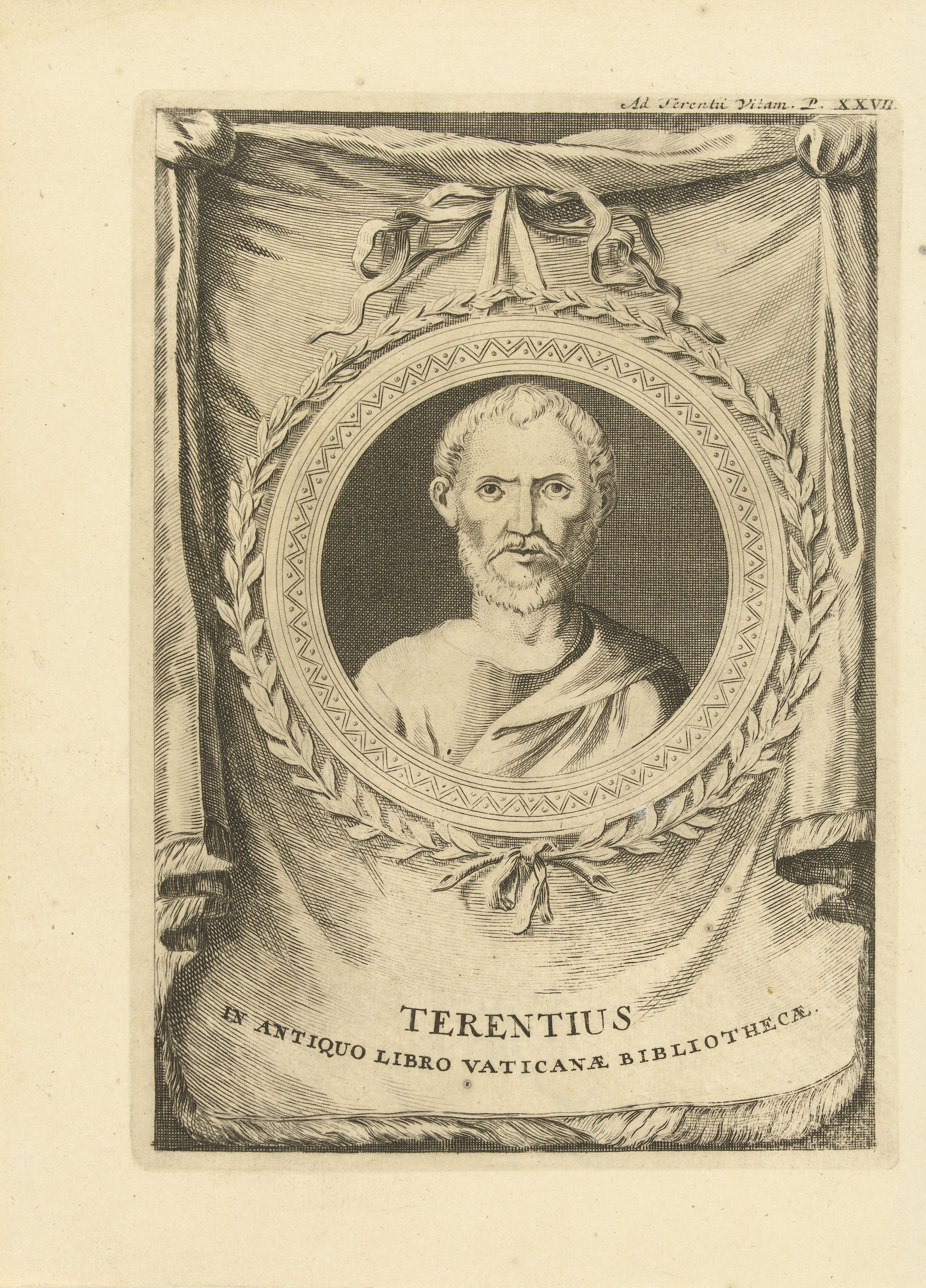
1726 portrait of Terence, created by Dutch artist Pieter van Cuyck

Terence was said to have been of "moderate height, slender, and of dark complexion." Suetonius' description of Terence's complexion is likely an inference from his supposed African origin, and his description of the poet's physique may have originated as a metaphor for the "lightness" of his verse style, just as the poet Philitas of Cos was said to have weighted his shoes with lead lest he blow away in the wind. Likenesses of Terence found in medieval manuscripts have no authenticity. Suetonius says that Terence was survived by a daughter who later married a Roman knight, and was said to have left 20 acres of gardens on the Appian Way, a report contradicted by another of Suetonius' sources who says that Terence died poor.

=== Name and ethnicity ===
Ancient biographers' reports that Terence was born in Africa may be an inference from his name and not independent biographical information. His cognomen Afer ("the [North] African") may indicate that Terence hailed from ancient Libya. However, such names did not necessarily denote origin, and there were Romans who had this cognomen who were not Africans, such as Domitius Afer.

It has often been asserted on the basis of the name that Terence was of Berber descent, as the Romans distinguished between Berbers, called Afri in Latin, and Carthaginians, called Poeni. However, lexicographic evidence does not support the validity of this distinction during Terence's lifetime. If Terence was born as a slave in Carthage, it is possible his mother was an ethnic Italian brought there as a war captive by Hannibal. Carney argues that Terence must have been born from the Italiote Greek population enslaved by Hannibal, as this would explain his proficiency in Latin and Greek. F. H. Sandbach notes that in the modern world, it is rare, but not entirely unknown, for an author to achieve literary distinction in a second language.

=== Dates ===
Terence's date of birth is uncertain, though Sesto Prete infers from Terence's characterisation of himself as a "new" writer (Eu. 43), and of a rival poet as "old" (Hau. 23), that Terence was young when he wrote his plays in the 160s. Suetonius' statement that Terence died at about the age of 25 in 159 BC would imply that he was born in 184 BC, the same year as the death of Plautus, and was only 18 years old when he produced his first play. The variant reading that Terence was in his 30s when he died suggests instead that he was born ten years earlier in 194, which would appear to be supported by the statement attributed to Fenestella that Terence was older than Scipio and Laelius. Jerome's Chronicon places Terence's death in 158 BC.

== Plays ==
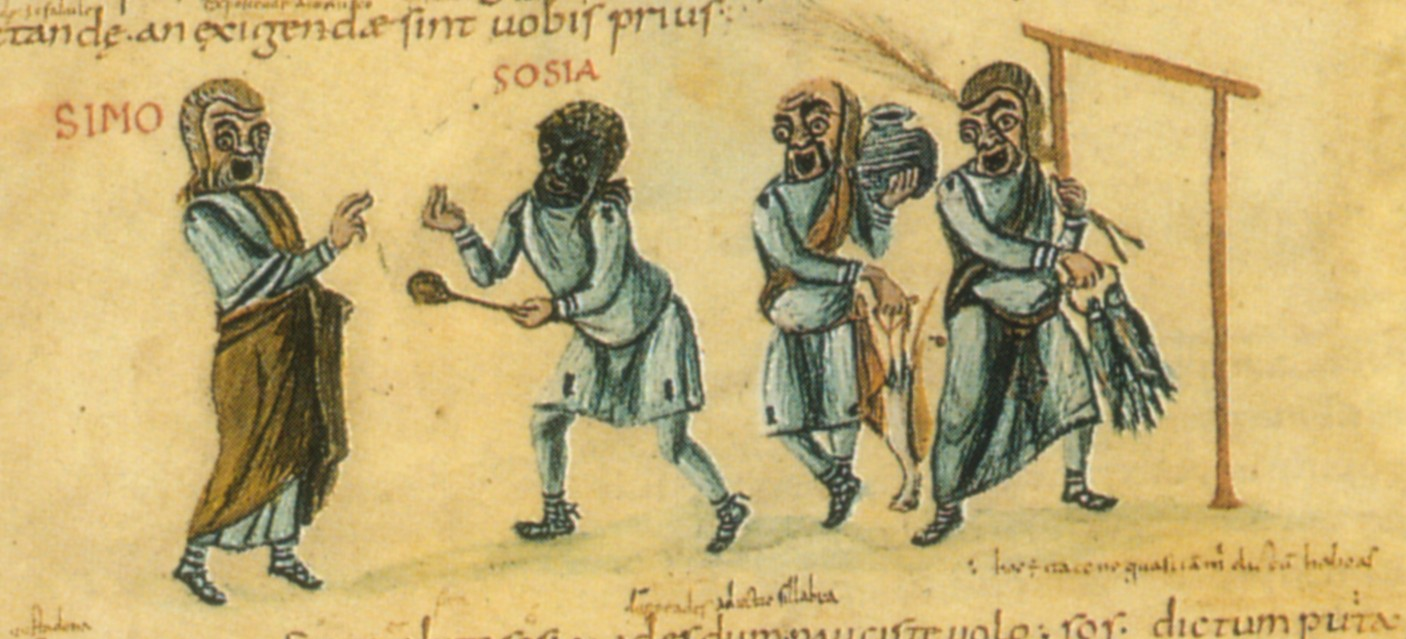
Miniature from the Vatican Terence of masked actors performing the first scene of the Andria

Like Plautus, Terence adapted Greek plays from the late phases of Attic comedy. Unlike Plautus, however, Terence's writing style emphasized simple, conversational Latin, pleasant and direct, over visual humor.

Five of Terence's plays are about a pair of young men in love (in the Hecyra there is only one young man, who is already married, but who suspects his wife of infidelity). In all the plays there are two women involved, one a citizen, the other a prostitute. In four of the plays (not Hecyra nor Adelphoe) a recognition (anagnorisis or anagnorismos) occurs which proves that one of the girls is the long-lost daughter of a respectable citizen, thus clearing the way for her marriage.

Terence's six plays are:

- Andria (The Girl from Andros) (166 BC)

A young Athenian, Pamphilus, is desperately in love with Glycerium, a foreign girl of low class, and has made her pregnant. But his father Simo wants him to marry the daughter of his friend Chremes. Meanwhile his friend Charinus is in love with the daughter that Pamphilus rejects. The wily slave Davus advises Pamphilus to agree to the marriage, believing that Chremes will object to it because of his affair with Glycerium, but the plan goes wrong when Chremes agrees to the marriage after all. Pamphilus is furious with Davus. Simo is also furious since he believes that birth of Glycerium's baby is just one of Davus's tricks. The situation is saved when, thanks to the arrival of a stranger from Andros, Chremes realises that Glycerium is his own long-lost daughter. The two young men get to marry the women of their choice and Davus is rescued from punishment.

- Heauton Timorumenos (The Self-Tormentor) (163 BC)

An Athenian farmer, Chremes, asks his neighbour Menedemus why he works all day on his farm. Menedemus says he is punishing himself for allowing his anger over his son Clinia's love affair with a poor girl to push the boy into going abroad on military service; he misses him terribly. On returning home Chremes finds that Clinia has returned and is visiting Chremes' son Clitipho. Chremes' wily slave Syrus brings Clinia's girlfriend Antiphila to Chremes' house; but he also brings Clitipho's girlfriend, the courtesan Bacchis. To conceal Clitipho's affair, he says they will pretend to Chremes that Bacchis is Clinia's girlfriend, and that Antiphila is one of Bacchis's servants. In another ruse he suggests that Chremes should persuade Menedemus to buy Antiphila so that Clinia can stay with Bacchis. However, when Clitipho's mother discovers from a ring that Antiphila is her own daughter, whom Chremes had ordered to be exposed as a baby, this plan falls through. Undeterred, Syrus tricks Chremes into paying money to Bacchis for Antiphila's release. But when Chremes learns that it is Clitipho who is in love with Bacchis, he is furious, especially at the thought of how much Bacchis will cost. At first he threatens to disinherit Clitipho, but eventually he forgives him on condition that he agrees to marry a suitable girl at once. Clinia, meanwhile, is allowed to marry Antiphila. Syrus is also forgiven.

- Eunuchus (The Eunuch) (161 BC)

A young man, Phaedria, is in love with a courtesan, Thais. He reluctantly agrees to leave town for a couple of days so that Thais can spend time with a rival lover, Thraso, who has promised to give her a certain slave girl who had previously been in her family. Before leaving town, Phaedria gives Thais an African maid and a eunuch. But while he is absent his 16-year-old brother Chaerea, at the suggestion of the slave Parmeno, disguises himself as the eunuch, gains access to Thais's house, and rapes the young girl, who is actually an Athenian citizen kidnapped in childhood. Thais's plans to restore the girl to her family are ruined. The situation is resolved when Chaerea begs Thais for forgiveness and offers to marry the girl himself. Phaedria gets to continue his affair with Thais, but is persuaded to share her with Thraso, who is richer than he is and can defray the expense of her upkeep. Parmeno, despite the gleeful predictions of Thais's maid Pythias, in the end escapes punishment.

- Phormio (161 BC)

While their fathers are away Antipho has fallen in love with a poor orphaned citizen, and his cousin Phaedria has fallen for a slave girl. Phormio, a parasite, has helped Antipho to marry the poor girl by making a false claim in court. When Antipho's father Demipho returns he is furious because he had wanted Antipho to marry his brother Chremes's daughter. Chremes agrees to pay Phormio 30 minae on condition that he removes the girl and marries her himself. Too late Chremes realises that the poor girl is his own daughter. He tries to undo the arrangement with Phormio, but Phormio has already paid the money to Phaedria to buy his slave girl. Phormio escapes punishment since Chremes' wealthy wife Nausistrata is furious not only about Chremes' secret second marriage but that he had been embezzling her money to pay for it. Antipho is allowed to keep his wife, Phaedria to keep his girlfriend, and Phormio is invited to dinner.

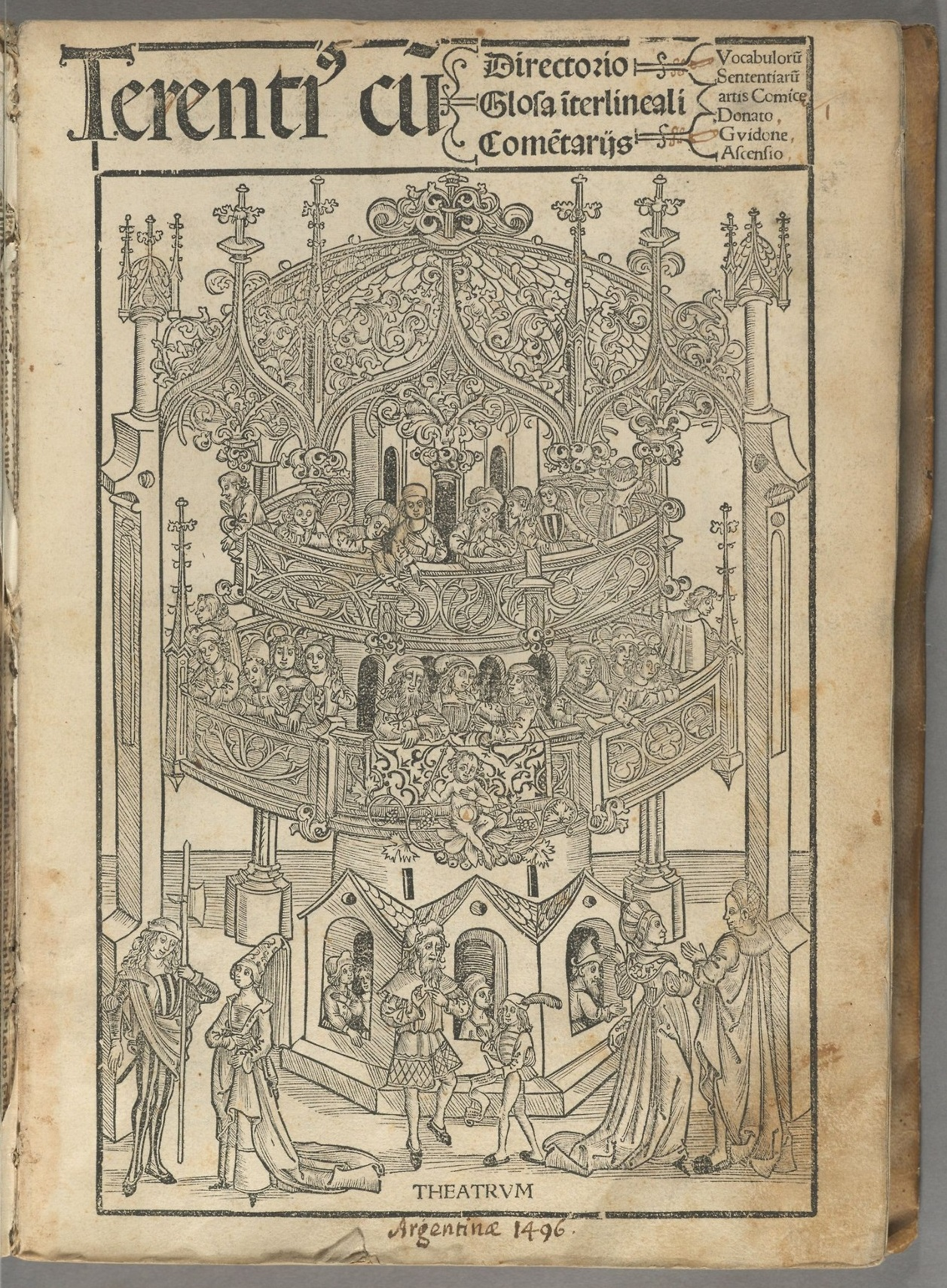
1496 edition of Terence's Works

- Hecyra (The Mother-in-Law) (165 BC, but eventually performed in 160 BC)

Laches' son, Pamphilus, has been made to marry Philumena, daughter of their neighbour Phidippus. At first he refused to sleep with her, because of his love for a courtesan, Bacchis, but gradually he grows to love his wife. But while he is away Philumena leaves their home and moves back to her father's house. Everyone blames the mother-in-law, Sostrata, or else his continuing love for Bacchis. But when Pamphilus returns he discovers that the real reason for her departure is that she is about to give birth to a child, which he believes is not his. He therefore decides to divorce Philumena even though he still loves her. The situation is resolved when Philumena's mother Myrrina discovers Philumena's ring which Pamphilus had given to Bacchis. It is revealed that Pamphilus had drunkenly raped a young unknown woman some ten months ago and taken her ring, making Pamphilus the father of Philumena's child. The couple reconcile, and the gossipy slave Parmeno and the two fathers are kept in the dark about the rape.

- Adelphoe (The Brothers) (160 BC)

Micio, a wealthy Athenian bachelor, has brought up Aeschinus, the adopted elder son of his brother Demea, in town in an indulgent way. Meanwhile Demea has brought up his younger son Ctesipho in the village in a strict fashion. When Ctesipho falls in love with a slave-girl, Aeschinus on his behalf abducts the girl from the slave-dealer, Sannio, who owns her. Meanwhile, however, the widowed neighbour, Sostrata, alarmed that Aeschinus seems to have abandoned her daughter whom Aeschinus had made pregnant, sends her relative Hegio to complain to Micio, to Aeschinus's embarrassment. A rascally slave, Syrus, plays his part by negotiating with the slave-dealer, and by keeping Demea out of the way of Ctesipho by various ruses. When Demea at last finds Ctesipho and his girlfriend in Micio's house, he is furious and reproaches Micio for interfering in Ctesipho's upbringing. The situation is resolved when Demea takes control. Changing from strictness to indulgence, he suggests that they should forego Aeschinus's wedding procession and simply knock down the dividing wall between the two houses; in addition he insists that Micio must marry Sostrata, give Syrus his freedom and some business capital, and grant Hegio an income from part of his land. Ctesipho is allowed to keep his music-girl.

== Ancient commentary ==
Jerome mentions in Contra Rufinum I.16 that "my teacher Donatus" had written a commentary on the comedies of Terence. Donatus' commentary does not survive in the form in which he originally wrote it. It is commonly believed that an unknown medieval scribe, using two or more manuscripts of Terence containing marginal notes excerpted from Donatus, copied the notes in order to reconstitute the commentary as a separate book, incorporating extraneous material in the process, assigning notes to verses where they did not originally belong, or including material that had been otherwise changed in the course of transmission. Citations from Donatus' commentary which are not found in the extant redaction occur in Priscian and in scholia to the Codex Bembinus and Codex Victorianus. Another ancient commentary is attributed to one Eugraphius, of whom nothing is known but his authorship of this commentary. Donatus' commentary on the Heauton timorumenos is lacking, but his references to this play in his commentary on other parts of the corpus and Eugraphius' commentary help to make up the gap.

In its extant form, Donatus' commentary is prefaced by Suetonius' Vita Terenti, a short essay on the genre of comedy and its differences from tragedy now commonly called De fabula, and a separate, shorter work on the same subject which in some manuscripts begins with the heading De comoedia. Friedrich Lindenbrog was able to identify the De fabula as the work of an earlier commentator on Terence named Evanthius (probably identical with the grammarian Evanthius said in Jerome's Chronicon to have died at Constantinople in AD 358) because the grammarian Rufinus of Antioch (5th cent. AD), in a work On the Metres of Terence, quotes the De fabula and ascribes it to Evanthius. Evanthius' work is otherwise lost. The De comoedia has continued to be considered the work of Donatus.

== Manuscripts of Terence ==
The manuscripts of Terence can be divided into two main groups. One group has just one representative, the Codex Bembinus (known as A), dating to the 4th or early 5th century AD, and kept in the Vatican library. This book, written in rustic capitals, is one of the earliest surviving manuscripts of any Latin writer. It has the plays in the order An., Eu., Hau., Ph., Hec., Ad. Three small fragments of similar antiquity survive as well.

Approximately 650 manuscripts exist of later date. These are often known as the "Calliopian" manuscripts, based on subscriptions to the plays found in several of the earlier manuscripts indicating the text had been corrected by someone named Calliopius; nothing further is known of this individual. They date from the 9th century onwards and are written in minuscule letters. This group can be subdivided into three classes. The first class, known as γ (gamma), dates to the 9th, 10th, and 11th centuries and includes manuscripts P (Parisinus), C (Vaticanus), and possibly F (Ambrosianus), and E (Riccardianus) among others. They have the plays in the order An., Eu., Hau., Ad., Hec., Ph.. Manuscript C is the famous Codex Vaticanus Latinus 3868, which has illustrations which seem to be copied from originals dating in style to the mid-third century.

Another group, known as δ (delta), has the plays in alphabetical order: An., Ad., Eu., Ph.(=F), Hau., Hec. This consists of 3 or 4 10th-century manuscripts: D (Victorianus), G (Decurtatus), p (Parisinus), and perhaps also L (Lipsiensis).

All the remaining manuscripts belong to the "mixed" group and contain readings copied from both γ and δ, and so are of little value in establishing the text.

It is thought that the γ group and the δ group go back to two archetypes, both now lost, called Γ (Gamma) and Δ (Delta), and that both of these were copied from a single archetype, also now lost, known as Σ (sigma). According to A. J. Brothers, manuscript A, although it contains some errors, generally has a better text than Σ, which has a number of changes designed perhaps to make Terence easier to read in schools. Both A and the now lost Σ are believed to be derived from an even earlier archetype known as Φ (phi), the date of which is unknown.

In addition to these manuscripts there are also certain commentaries, glossaries, and quotations in ancient writers and grammarians which sometimes assist editors in establishing the original reading. The best known of these is the Commentum Terenti, a commentary by the 4th-century grammarian Aelius Donatus, which is often helpful, although the part dealing with the Heauton Timorumenos is missing.

== Cultural legacy ==
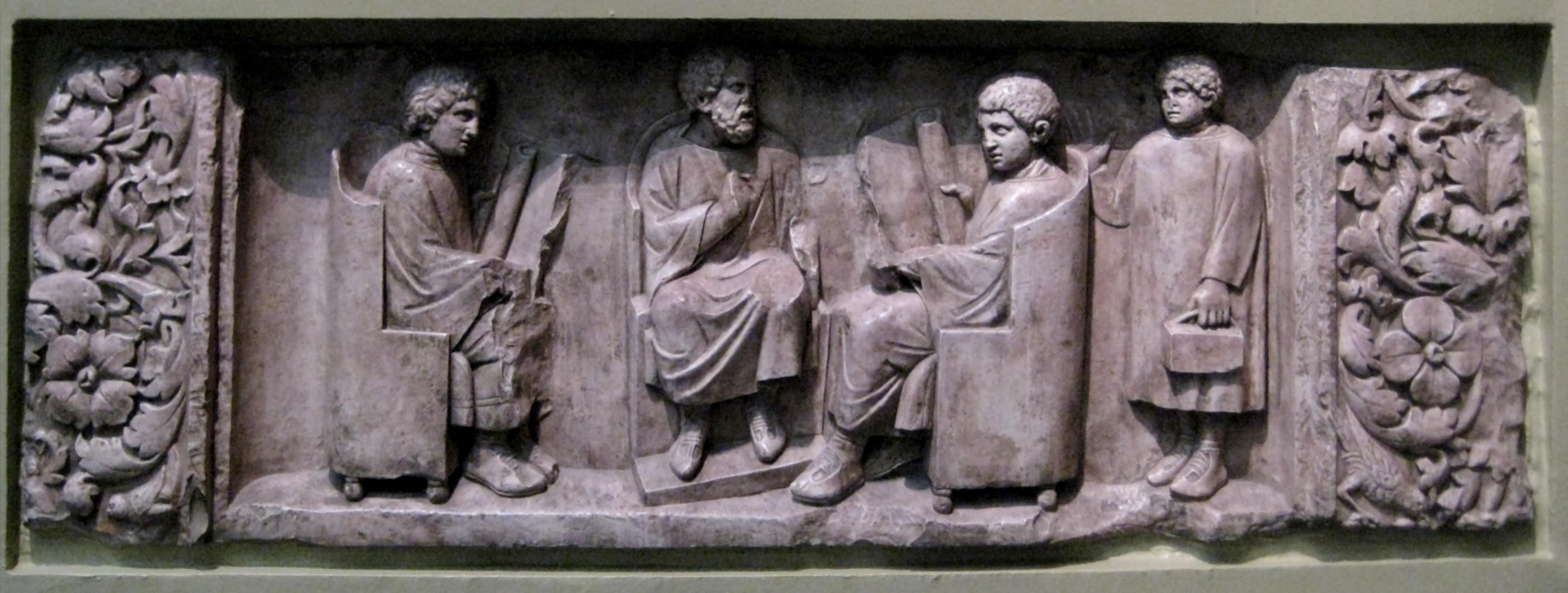
Roman relief of a teacher with three students, c. 180–185 AD

At a relatively early date, Terence's play texts began to circulate as literary works for a reading public, as opposed to scripts for the use of actors. By the end of the 2nd century BC, Terence had been established as a literary "classic" and a standard school text. Cicero (born 106 BC) recalls that when he was a boy, his education in rhetoric included an assignment to recount Simo's narrative from the first scene of the Andria in his own words. Throughout the imperial period, Terence was second only to Vergil as the most widely known and read of Latin poets, and he remained a core school author while other Republican authors were displaced from the curriculum by Vergil and other Augustan poets. By the late 4th century AD, Terence had become one of the four main canonical school authors (the others being Cicero, Sallust, and Vergil), canonised in a celebrated work by Arusianus Messius, and later referred to by Cassiodorus as "Messius' quadriga." St Jerome, St Augustine of Hippo, and the pupils of a "grammarian" friend of St Sidonius Apollinaris were all set to read the Eunuchus in school, and in another of his letters, Sidonius describes reading the Hecyra together with his son at home.

Terence was one of the few canonical classical authors to maintain a continuous presence in medieval literacy, and the large number of surviving manuscripts bears witness to his great popularity. Adolphus Ward said that Terence led "a charmed life in the darkest ages of learning", a remark approved by E. K. Chambers, but Paul Theiner takes issue with this, suggesting that it is more appropriate to attribute "a charmed life" to authors who survived the Middle Ages by chance in a few manuscripts found in isolated libraries, whereas the broad and constant popularity of Terence "rendered elfin administrations quite unnecessary."

Roman students learning to write would regularly be assigned to copy edifying sententiae, or "maxims", a practice adopted from Greek paedagogy, and Terence was a rich source of such sententiae. Scores of Terentian maxims enjoyed such currency in late antiquity that they often lost nominal association with their author, with those who quoted Terence qualifying his words as a common proverb. Through the Middle Ages, Terence was frequently quoted as an authority on human nature and the mores of men, without regard for which character spoke the line or the original dramatic context, as long as the quotation was sententious in itself when separated from the rest of the play.

Augustine was a lifelong admirer of Terence's observations on the human condition, and 38 quotations from 28 distinct passages of Terence have been identified in Augustine's works. Notwithstanding his respect for Terence's moralising, when Augustine writes in the Confessions about his school days, he quotes the scene from the Eunuchus where Chaerea recounts how he and Pamphila looked together at a painting of Zeus intruding in the home of Danaë, after which Chaerea, emboldened by the example of the pagan god, took the opportunity to rape Pamphila. Augustine argues that it is not necessary for students to be exposed to such "vileness" (turpitudo) merely to learn vocabulary and eloquence.

In the 10th century, Hrotsvit of Gandersheim wrote six plays based on the lives of Christian saints, on the model of the six comedies of Terence. In a preface explaining her purpose in writing, Hrotsvit takes up Augustine's critique of the moral influence of the comedies, saying that many Christians attracted by Terence's style find themselves corrupted by his subject matter, and she has undertaken to write works in the same genre so that the literary form once used "to describe the shameless acts of licentious women" might be repurposed to glorify the chastity of holy virgins. As Terence's subject matter is trivial while Hrotsvit's is important, his plays are in verse while hers are in prose, her plays are written in the same style as other medieval literature and lack verbal reminiscences of Terence apart from some oaths and interjections, and she does not respect the unity of time or other ancient dramatic conventions, it has been argued that Terence's influence on Hrotsvit is superficial, and the only similarity between them is that they each wrote six plays.

Hrotsvit's indebtedness to Terence lies rather in situations and subject matter, transposed to invert the Terentian plot and its values; the place of the Terentian hero who successfully pursues a woman is taken by the girl who triumphs by resisting all advances (or a prostitute who abandons her former life), and a happy ending lies not in the consummation of the young couple's marriage, but in a figurative marriage to Christ. Whereas in the Eunuchus, Chaerea entered a courtesan's home disguised as a eunuch to gain access to his beloved, two of Hrotsvit's plays (Abraham and Paphnutius) feature a man entering a brothel disguised as a lover in order to win a woman to repentance and a life of continence. Robert Talbot reads Hrotsvit's plays as a Christian allegorisation of Terence designed to rehabilitate the comedies themselves, as Hrotsvit's reconfiguration of the genre to demonstrate the superiority of heavenly love to earthly love will enable readers to read Terence in a new way, with their minds directed from the sinful content to a higher Christian meaning. Hrotsvit did not exercise a significant influence on European literature before her works were rediscovered and printed in 1501.

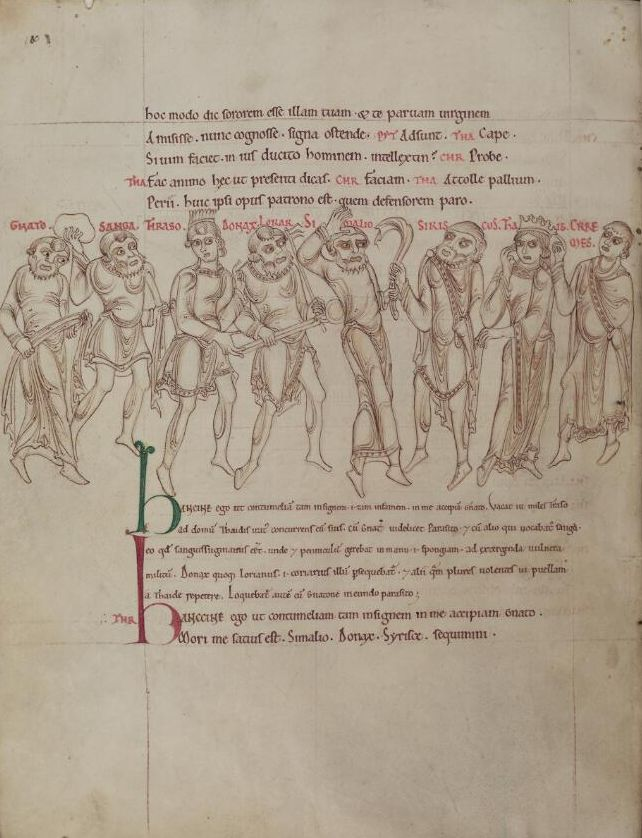
Mid-12th-century illustrated Latin manuscript of Terence's Comedies from St Albans Abbey, now held at the Bodleian Library, Oxford

In the Divine Comedy, Dante's guide Vergil tells him that Terence is in Limbo among the virtuous pagans (Purg. XXII, 94–105), and shows him Thais, the character from the Eunuchus, in the eighth circle of hell where flatterers are punished. (Inf. XVIII, 133–5) It has been claimed that Dante did not know Terence directly, and his references to Terence are derived from citations in Cicero or medieval florilegia. However, Terence was one of the most commonly read authors in the 14th century, and Joseph Russo argues that considering the access Dante would have had to manuscripts of Terence and the desire he would have had to read Terence, the logical conclusion is that "Dante must have known Terence."

Renaissance humanists delighted in Terence. Giovanni Boccaccio copied out in his own hand all of Terence's comedies in a manuscript that is now in the Laurentian Library.

The first printed edition of Terence appeared in Strasbourg in 1470, while the first certain post-antique performance of one of Terence's plays, Andria, took place in Florence in 1476. There is evidence, however, that Terence was performed much earlier. The short dialogue Terentius et delusor was probably written to be performed as an introduction to a Terentian performance in the 9th century (possibly earlier).

Beatus Rhenanus writes that Erasmus, gifted in his youth with a tenacious memory, held Terence's comedies as closely as his fingers and toes. In the De ratione studii (1511), a central text for European curricula, Erasmus wrote, "among Latin authors, who is more useful for learning to speak than Terence? He is pure, concise, and near to everyday conversation, and pleasant to youth as well for his genre of plot." Martin Luther wrote that "I love Terence" and considered his comedies useful not only to help schoolboys improve their language skills, but also to teach them about society, because Terence "saw how it goes with people"; even if there were some "obscene" passages in the comedies, Luther insisted that they were no less appropriate for young people to read without censorship than the Bible, which "contains amatory things everywhere." The indexes of the Weimar edition of Martin Luther's works note nearly 200 references to Terence and his plays.

The preservation of Terence through the church enabled his work to influence much of later Western drama. Two of the earliest English comedies, the 16th-century Ralph Roister Doister and Gammer Gurton's Needle, are thought to parody Terence's plays. Montaigne and Molière cite and imitate him.

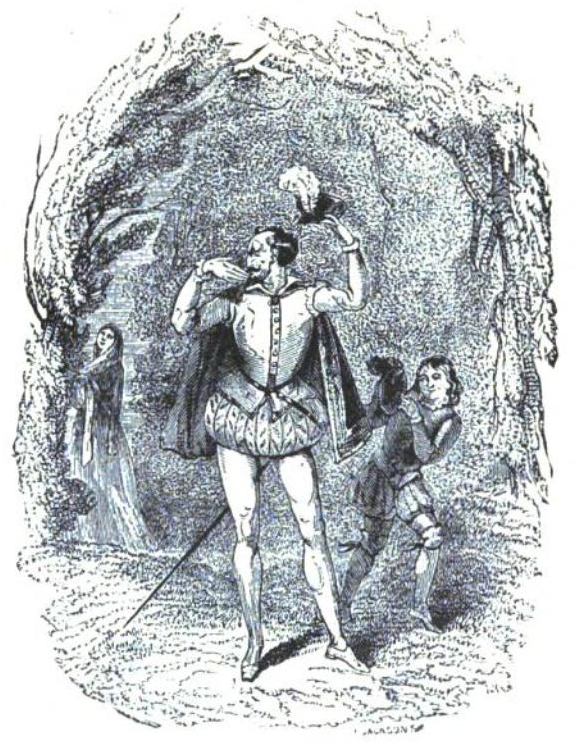
Engraving of Shakespeare's "thrasonical" soldier Armado.

Based on what is known about a typical curriculum at a grammar school such as William Shakespeare went to, it may be considered certain that Shakespeare must have studied Terence as a boy. In Shakespeare's day, a typical schoolboy at the age of 9 would begin to memorise a great part, if not all, of Terence. A quote from the Eunuchus in Shakespeare's The Taming of the Shrew is not taken direct from the play, but quoted in a form in which it is found in William Lily's Latin Grammar and Nicholas Udall's Floures for Latine spekynge, with the syntax adapted to form an independent sentence. However, the indebtedness of the character of Armado in Love's Labour's Lost to Thraso in the Eunuchus points to Shakespeare's familiarity with the play as a whole. Chaerea's exultation upon coming out of Thais' house after the rape, declaring himself content to die in that blissful moment, also seems to be echoed in Othello II.1 and The Merry Wives of Windsor III.3. Shakespeare's encounter with Terence in grammar school introduced him to comedy and scenic structure, laying the foundations for his art.

Terence's plays were a standard part of the Latin curriculum of the neoclassical period. In a letter prescribing a course of education for his nephew Peter Carr, Thomas Jefferson listed Terence among classical poets Carr already had read or would read at school. Jefferson copied four extracts from the Andria into his literary commonplace book, seemingly in the late 1760s and 1770s, and the presence of three different editions of Terence in the carefully selected second Monticello library is a clear indication that Terence formed a part of Jefferson's retirement reading.

In 1781, John Adams offered his son John Quincy Adams a copy of Anne Dacier's edition of Terence with a parallel French translation, writing, "Terence is remarkable, for good Morals, good Taste and good Latin—his Language has a Simplicity and an elegance, that makes him proper to be accurately studied, as A Model." This was declined, as John Quincy believed his teacher would not like him to have a translation "because when I shall translate him he would desire that I might do it without help." John Quincy eventually read the Andria over three evenings in February 1786, and was not impressed with the pace of his Harvard class, which finished the play three months later. He recorded in his diary that "The Play is interesting, and many of the Sentiments are fine", and though he found the plot highly improbable, "the Critic can never find Perfection, and the person that is willing to be pleased with what he reads, is happier than he who is always looking for faults."

In 1816, John Quincy's son George Washington Adams performed in a school production of Andria in the role of the old man Crito, to the relief of the family, who had worried he might be given a less "respectable" part. George's grandmother Abigail Adams, having read the play, took exception to "the manners and morals". Grandfather John, after rereading all six of Terence's comedies, also expressed apprehension about whether they were fit to be taught or exhibited to impressionable youths, who lacked sufficient life experience to recognise certain characters and their deeds as morally repugnant and react appropriately. Accordingly, Adams undertook a month-long project to go through the plays excerpting approximately 140 passages that he considered illustrative of human nature as it is the same in all ages and countries, adding translations and comments explaining the moral lessons his grandsons should draw from the texts. John Quincy believed the manners and plots of Terence's plays were too remote from modern life for there to be a danger of a detrimental influence on students' morals, but praised his father's project, writing, "You have indeed skimmed the cream of Terence and sent it to my boys—I trust they will preserve it and that it will aid them in drawing all the solid benefit from the amanuensis of Laelius and Scipio, which he can afford to their future lives." When Adams sent his grandson Charles Francis Adams his excerpts from the Phormio, he remarked, "in these Plays of Terence ... Are not the Slaves Superior Beings to the Citizens? Every Smart Expression; every brilliant Image, every Moral Sentiment is in the Mouth of a Slave." In 1834, when Charles read the works of Terence, copying in his grandfather's comments and making other notes, he responded, "In returning to answer these questions, I must disagree with the sentiment. I cannot overlook the characters of Menedemus and Chremes, of Micio and Demea which contain more moral sentiment than all the Slaves in the six Plays."

American playwright Thornton Wilder based his novel The Woman of Andros on Terence's Andria.

Due to his cognomen Afer, Terence has long been identified with Africa and heralded as the first poet of the African diaspora by generations of writers, including Juan Latino, Alexandre Dumas, Langston Hughes and Maya Angelou. Phyllis Wheatley, the first published African-American poet, asked why the Muses had inspired "one alone of Afric's sable race." Thomas Jefferson, on the other hand, in an attempt to prove that African-Americans were naturally incapable of poetry, claimed that Terence had been "of the race of whites." Two of his plays were produced in Denver with black actors.

Questions as to whether Terence received assistance in writing or was not the actual author have been debated over the ages, as described in the 1911 edition of the Encyclopædia Britannica:

[In a prologue to one of his plays, Terence] meets the charge of receiving assistance in the composition of his plays by claiming as a great honour the favour which he enjoyed with those who were the favorites of the Roman people. But the gossip, not discouraged by Terence, lived and throve; it crops up in Cicero and Quintilian, and the ascription of the plays to Scipio had the honour to be accepted by Montaigne and rejected by Diderot.

== Editions ==
=== Works of Terence ===
- Dacier, Anne, ed. (1688). Les comédies de Térence traduites en françois, avec des remarques, par Madame D***. Paris. 3 vols.
- Bentley, Richard, ed. (1726). Publii Terentii Afri Comoediae. Cambridge.
- Umpfenbach, Franz, ed. (1870). P. Terenti Comoediae. Berlin: Weidmannsche Buchhandlung.
- Ashmore, Sidney G., ed. (1910). The Comedies of Terence (2nd ed.). New York: Oxford University Press.
- Kauer, Robert; Lindsay, Wallace M., eds. (1926). P. Terenti Afri Comoediae (2nd ed.). Oxford: Clarendon Press.
- Kauer, Robert; Lindsay, Wallace M., eds. (1958). P. Terenti Afri Comoediae (2nd ed. with additions to the apparatus by Otto Skutsch ed.). Oxford: Clarendon Press.
- Marouzeau, Jules, ed. (1942–49). Comédies. Paris: Les Belles-Lettres. 3 vols.
- Barsby, John, ed. (2001). Terence. Loeb Classical Library. Cambridge, MA: Harvard University Press. 2 vols.
- Victor, Benjamin, ed. (2023). Terence, Comédies. I. Andrienne, Hécyre. Paris: Les Belles Lettres.

=== Individual plays ===
- Shipp, G. P., ed. (1960). Andria (2nd ed.). Melbourne: Oxford University Press.
- Monti, Richard C., ed. (1986). Andria. Bryn Mawr Latin Commentaries. Bryn Mawr, PA. 2 vols.
- Goldberg, Sander M., ed. (2022). Andria. Cambridge Greek and Latin Classics. Cambridge: Cambridge University Press.
- Brothers, A. J., ed. (1988). The Self-Tormentor. Warminster: Aris & Phillips. ISBN 0-85668-302-7.
- Fabia, Philippe, ed. (1895). Eunuchus. Paris: Armand Colin. Introduction and commentary in French.
- Barsby, John, ed. (1999). Eunuchus. Cambridge Greek and Latin Classics. Cambridge: Cambridge University Press.
- Dziatzko, Karl; Hauler, Edmund, eds. (1913). Phormio (4th ed.). Leipzig: Teubner. Introduction and commentary in German.
- Martin, R. H., ed. (1959). Phormio. London: Methuen.
- Maltby, Robert, ed. (2012). Phormio. Aris & Phillips Classical Texts. Oxford: Oxbow Books. ISBN 978-0-85668-606-1.
- Carney, T. F., ed. (1963). P. Terenti Afri Hecyra. Pretoria: Classical Association of Rhodesia and Nyasaland.
- Ireland, S., ed. (1990). The Mother-in-Law. Warminster: Aris & Phillips. ISBN 0-85668-373-6.
- Goldberg, Sander M., ed. (2013). Hecyra. Cambridge Greek and Latin Classics. Cambridge: Cambridge University Press.
- Dziatzko, Karl; Kauer, Robert, eds. (1903). Adelphoe (2nd ed.). Leipzig: Teubner. Introduction and commentary in German.
- Martin, R. H., ed. (1976). Adelphoe. Cambridge Greek and Latin Classics. Cambridge: Cambridge University Press.
- Gratwick, A. S., ed. (1999). The Brothers (2nd ed.). Warminster: Aris & Phillips.

=== Ancient commentary ===
- Wessner, Paul, ed. (1902–1908). Aeli Donati Commentum Terenti. Leipzig: Teubner. 3 vols.
  - Wessner, Paul, ed. (1902). Aeli Donati Commentum Terenti. Vol. I. Leipzig: Teubner. Contains the Vita Terenti, excerpts from Evanthius of Constantinople, and commentary by Donatus on the Andria and Eunuchus.
  - Wessner, Paul, ed. (1905). Aeli Donati Commentum Terenti. Vol. II. Leipzig: Teubner. Contains commentary by Donatus on the Adelphoe, the Hecyra, and the Phormio.
  - Wessner, Paul, ed. (1908). Aeli Donati Commentum Terenti. Vol. III, pt. 1. Leipzig: Teubner. Contains commentary on all six plays by Eugraphius.
  - Vol. III, pt. 2, which would have contained the scholia Bembina, was never published.
- Cupaiuolo, Giovanni, ed. (1992). De fabula (2nd ed.). Naples: Loffredo. Critical edition of Evanthius with Italian introduction, translation, and commentary.
- Cioffi, Carmela, ed. (2017). Aeli Donati quod fertur Commentum ad Andriam Terenti. Berlin: De Gruyter. doi:10.1515/9783110515404. ISBN 978-3-11-051509-1.

== See also ==
- Translation
- Metres of Roman comedy
- Codex Vaticanus 3868
- List of slaves
- Roman Africans
- Quod licet Iovi, non licet bovi
- Trochaic septenarius
