= Apollodorus of Boeotia =

Apollodorus from Boeotia was a man of 2nd-century BCE ancient Greece who, together with Epaenetus, went as ambassador from Boeotia to Messenia in 183 BCE, just at the time when the Messenians, terrified by Lycortas, the general of the Achaeans, were inclined to negotiate for peace. The influence of the Boeotian ambassadors decided the question, and the Messenians concluded peace with the Achaeans.
