= Apollodorus of Nicaea =

Apollodorus was a man mentioned among the distinguished people of Nicaea by the 6th-century writer Stephanus of Byzantium.
