= Apollodorus Logisticus =

Ancient Greek mathematician

Apollodorus Logisticus was a man of ancient Greece who appears to have been a mathematician, if as is usually supposed, he is the same as the one who is called Arithmetikos (ἀριθμητικός).

Whether he is the same as the Apollodotus of whom Plutarch quotes two lines, is not quite certain.
