= Apollodorus Pyragrus =

Apollodorus Pyragrus was a man of ancient Sicily who was one of the most influential citizens of the town of Agyrium (modern Agira). He is described by the writer Cicero as having given evidence against the praetor Verres, who was notorious for his misgovernment of Sicily.
