= Apollodorus of Gela =

Ancient New Comedy playwright

Apollodorus of Gela (Greek: Ἀπολλόδωρος ὁ Γελῷος), Magna Graecia, in Sicily was a New Comedy playwright. According to Eudokia Makrembolitissa and the Suda, he was a contemporary of Menander, and accordingly lived between the years 340 and 290 BC.

Both the Suda and Eudokia attribute to him seven comedies, of which they give the titles. But while the editors of the Suda ascribes them to Apollodorus of Gela, they assign one of these same comedies in another passage to Apollodorus of Carystus. Other writers also frequently confound the two comic poets.

== Surviving Titles and Fragments ==
- Aischrion ("Aeschrion")
- Apoleipousa ("The Woman Who Leaves")
- Grammateidiopoios ("Maker of Writing Tablets")
- Deusopoios ("The Cloth-Dyer")
- Sisyphus ("Sisyphus")
- Philadelphoi ("Brother-Loving Men") or Apokarteron ("Man Who is Starving Himself")
- Pseudaias ("The False Ajax")

In addition to these seven plays, there are nine other titles (and associated fragments) which are only credited to "Apollodorus" by the ancient authorities, without specifying whether they were written by Apollodorus of Carystus or Apollodorus of Gela. They are as follows:

- Adelphoi ("Brothers")
- Aphanizomenos ("The Disappearing Man")
- Galatai ("The Galatians")
- Diamartanon ("The Man Who Is Failing Utterly")
- Kitharodos ("The Citharode")
- Lakaina ("The Laconian Woman")
- Paidion ("The Little Child")
- Paralogizomenoi ("The Beguiling Men")
- Synepheboi ("People Who Were Adolescents Together")
