= Apollodorus (physician) =

Apollodorus (Ancient Greek: Ἀπολλόδωρος) is the name of two physicians mentioned by Pliny the Elder, one of whom was a native of Citium (modern Kition), in Cyprus, the other of Tarentum (modern Taranto). Perhaps it was one of these who wrote to Ptolemy, king of Egypt, giving him directions as to what wines he should drink, though to which king of this name his precepts were addressed is not mentioned. A person of the same name wrote a work Ointments and Chaplets (Περὶ Μύρων καὶ Στεφάνων) quoted by Athenaeus, and another, quoted by the same author, On Venomous Animals (Περὶ Θηρίων), which is possibly the work that is several times referred to by Pliny.
