= Phormio (play) =

Ancient Roman play by Terence

Phormio is a Latin comic play by the early Roman playwright Terence, based on a now lost play by Apollodorus of Carystus entitled Epidikazomenos ("The Claimant"). It is generally believed to be Terence's fifth play. It was first performed at the Ludi Romani of 161 BC. Structurally, Phormio is considered to be one of the best Roman comedies.

== Characters ==
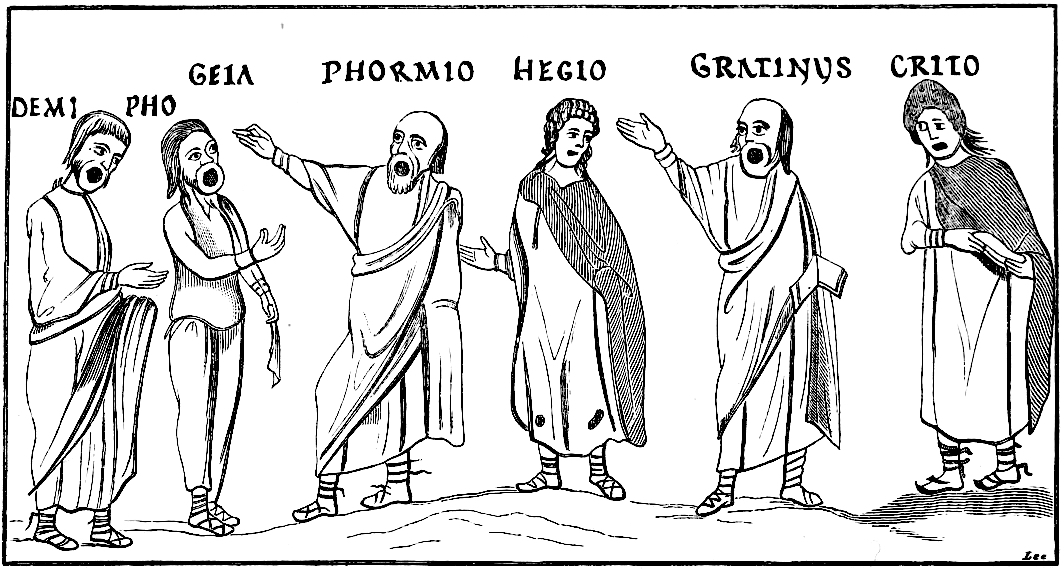

- Demipho – an Athenian nobleman
- Chremes – Brother of Demipho
- Antipho – Son of Demipho, in love with Phanium
- Phaedria – Chremes' son, in love with Pamphila
- Geta – Demipho's slave
- Davos – Geta's friend and fellow slave
- Phormio – A "parasite" (who performs services in return for food)
- Hegio – Demipho's friend and legal advisor
- Cratinus – Demipho's friend and legal advisor
- Crito – Demipho's friend and legal advisor
- Dorio – A slave-dealer
- Sophrona – Phanium's nurse
- Nausistrata – Chremes's wife
- Phanium – Chremes's daughter from his secret marriage on Lemnos. She does not appear on stage.
- Pamphila – The music-girl belonging to Dorio. Like Phanium, she does not appear on stage.

== Setting ==
The play is named after the character Phormio, a cunning "parasite" (that is, a person who makes a living by performing services for richer people). The plot is set in Athens, and revolves around the love affairs of two young men, Antipho and Phaedria, who are cousins. The scene is a street in Athens in which are the doors to three houses, belonging to Antipho's father Demipho, Phaedria's father Chremes, and a slave-dealer named Dorio (whose house is probably on the spectators' right, next to the exit leading to the forum). When the play begins, the two fathers are away from Athens on business trips. Neither of the two girls ever appears on stage.

== Metrical structure ==
In both Plautus and Terence's plays the usual pattern is to begin each section with iambic senarii (which were spoken without music), then a scene of music in various metres, and finally a scene in trochaic septenarii, which were apparently recited to the accompaniment of tibiae (a pair of reed pipes). In his book The Music of Roman Comedy, Moore calls this the "ABC succession", where A = iambic senarii, B = other metres, C = trochaic septenarii.

In the Phormio, the metres form the following pattern:

ABC, ABAC, ABC, ABC, AC

When compared with the traditional acts, it can be seen that in some places the metrical scheme is different; for example, although there are still five sections, the third section begins halfway through Act 2; and the 4th section extends into Act 5.

The abbreviations ia6 = iambic senarii, tr7 = trochaic septenarii, ia8 = iambic octonarii and so on.

== Plot summary ==
=== Prologue ===
- Prologue (lines 1–34): ia6 (34 lines)

The play begins with a prologue in which the poet replies to criticisms made earlier by another, unnamed, poet, and begs the audience to listen attentively to his new play.

=== The boys' love affair problems ===
- Act 1.1–1.2 (35–152): ia6 (118 lines)

The play proper opens with a dialogue between a cunning old slave, Geta, and his friend Davus, another slave. Geta explains how when the two brothers Demipho and Chremes went away separately on business he had been ordered to watch over their two sons; how Phaedria had immediately fallen in love with a lyre-player but had no money to buy her from her slave-dealer owner; and how meanwhile Antipho had fallen in love with a poor orphan girl whose guardian, an old nurse, refused to let him have her without marrying her since she was a free-born citizen. Geta goes on to relate how their friend Phormio had managed to arrange this by falsely claiming in a court that Antipho was her closest relative and was therefore obliged by law either to provide the girl with a dowry or to marry her.

- Act 1.2–1.4 (153–195): mixed metres (mostly ia8, but also tr8, tr7, ia4, tr4) (43 lines)

The next scene is a duet between the two cousins, Antipho terrified of what his father will say when he returns and finds out about the marriage, while Phaedria envies Antipho for having a girl available at all times. Suddenly Geta enters running with news.

- Act 1.4 (196–215): tr7 (20 lines)

Geta informs the boys that Antipho's father Demipho has arrived in Athens and is about to appear. Antipho, terrified of his father's approach, runs away. At line 203, the saying Fortune favors the bold has what may be its first appearance in Latin literature.

=== Demipho tries to undo Antipho's marriage ===
- Act 1.4 (216–230): ia6 (15 lines)

Geta advises Phaedria on how best to confront his uncle.

- Act 2.1 (231–253): mixed, mostly ia8 (21 lines)

Demipho enters in a furious mood, and not seeing Phaedria and Geta at first, he expresses his feelings in a soliloquy.

- Act 2.1 (254–314): ia6 (61 lines)

Phaedria tries to defend Antipho, and Geta also excuses himself on the grounds that as a slave he was not allowed to give evidence in court. Demipho sends him off to find Phormio, while he himself goes off to consult some friends.

- Act 2.2 (315–347): tr7 (33 lines)

Geta returns from the forum, accompanied by Phormio. He tells Phormio about the latest turn of events. Phormio boasts that since he, Phormio, has no money, there is nothing Demipho can do to him.

- Act 2.3, 2.4 (348–464): ia6 (117 lines)

Now Demipho and his three friends enter. Geta and Phormio pretend not to have seen them and stage an argument in which Phormio attacks Demipho's character for wanting to annul a marriage which a court has ordered. Eventually Demipho addresses Phormio directly and the two have an argument in which Demipho offers Phormio a paltry sum of 5 minae for taking the girl away. Phormio refuses and threatens to go to court again if Demipho tries to annul the marriage. He departs.

In the final scene of the act Demipho consults his three friends, but they all give contradictory advice. He decides to wait for his brother to arrive back from his trip so that he can consult him.

=== Phaedria's money problem ===
- Act 3.1–3.2 (465–503): mixed metres (tr8, tr7, ia8, tr8) (39 lines)

Antipho enters, and in a soliloquy chides himself for leaving it to others to defend him. Geta appears and reassures him that his interests have been well looked after.

- Act 3.2–3.3 (504–566): mixed, mostly tr7 (63 lines)

Now Antipho's cousin Phaedria emerges from a house accompanied by the slave-dealer Dorio. Phaedria begs Dorio to give him more time to raise the money to buy the lyre-player that he loves, but Dorio refuses. Pressured by Geta and Antipho, Dorio eventually agrees to let him have the girl if he can produce the sum of 30 minae by the following morning.

When Dorio has gone, Phaedria is in despair and Antipho urges Geta to find some solution to the problem. Phaedria declares that he will follow his girl wherever she is taken, or else commit suicide. Geta agrees to do what he can, if only perhaps Phormio can assist him. Antipho goes into the house to comfort his wife.

=== Chremes tries to undo Antipho's marriage ===
- Act 4.1–4.4 (567–712): ia6 (146 lines)

Demipho enters with his brother Chremes, who explains that when he went to the island of Lemnos to fetch his illegitimate daughter as a wife for Antipho he discovered that the girl and her mother had already departed for Athens. Now his plans are in disarray and he is afraid that his Athenian wife might discover about his Lemnian affair.

Geta now enters, and in a soliloquy he praises Phormio's cleverness. Suddenly he sees Chremes and Demipho. Meanwhile Antipho emerges from the house and listens to the conversation without revealing himself to Demipho and Chremes. Geta addresses Demipho and Chremes and tells them that Phormio is willing to marry the girl himself, for the sum of 30 minae. Despite Demipho's protests, Chremes agrees and says he will take the money out of the rent of his wife's property on Lemnos which he went to collect. The two brothers go inside Chremes' house.

Antipho now comes forward and reproaches Geta for betraying him, but Geta reassures him that it is all just a trick. Antipho departs for the forum.

Demipho and Chremes now come out of the house. Demipho is carrying a bag of money which he says he is going to take to the forum to pay Phormio in front of witnesses. Demipho remains on stage and so he is able to overhear the soliloquy which follows.

Sophrona, the nurse who has been looking after Chremes' daughter Phanium since her mother's death, comes out of Demipho's house and sings of her despair since she has heard that the boy's father is vehemently opposed to the marriage. Chremes recognises her and comes forward. She addresses him as "Stilpo", the pseudonym he used on Lemnos, but he begs her not to use that name any more as he fears the anger of his Athenian wife. After some misunderstanding it is revealed that Phanium is the same girl that has married Antipho.

- Act 4.5–5.5 (713–840): mixed metres (mostly ia8 and ia7, but also tr8, tr4cat, ia6) (128 lines)

Demipho enters with Geta. Demipho is complaining about having had to pay Phormio. He goes into Chremes' house to ask Chremes' wife Nausistrata to inform Phanium that Phanium must leave. Meanwhile Geta, after soliloquising on the punishment he may get for his deceptions, goes into Demipho's house to warn Phanium.

Demipho comes out accompanied by Nausistrata, who is complaining that Chremes hasn't brought her all the rent money she is due from her estates on Lemnos. She is about to go into Demipho's house to see Phanium when Chremes comes out. He tells Demipho he needs to get the money back. Nausistrata is suspicious but agrees to go back to her own home for now.

Antipho now appears from the forum, reflecting on his own misery compared with his cousin's good fortune in getting the money he needs to buy his lyre-player. Phormio now enters and tells Antipho that Phaedria has run away to enjoy a few days with his girlfriend.

Act 5.6 (841–883): tr7 (43 lines)

Geta now comes running out of Demipho's house. He sees Antipho and at first teases him by taking his time to reveal the good news; but finally he informs him that his father now accepts the marriage. They go into the house together.

=== The truth comes out ===
Act 5.7–5.9 (884–1010): ia6 (127 lines)

Phormio, left behind, soliloquises that he must devise a new plan to keep the money.

Demipho and Chremes now come out. Demipho sees Phormio and tells him he has changed his mind and wants his money back. Phormio indignantly refuses, on the grounds that he has had to break off another engagement in order to marry Phanium. He also reveals that he knows the secret of Chremes' bigamous second marriage. Chremes is anxious to let him have the money but Demipho tries to arrest Phormio and drag him off to court. Phormio calls out for Nausistrata to come out.

In the final scene, while Chremes is speechless with terror in case his wife throws him out, Phormio reveals to Nausistrata that Phanium is Chremes' daughter; he also says that the 30 minae has been spent on purchasing Phaedria's music-girl. When Chremes protests, Nausistrata tells him that a man with two wives can hardly complain if his son has one mistress.

- Act 5.9 (1011–1055): tr7 (45 lines)

Demipho begs Nausistrata to forgive Chremes. She declares that she will forgive her husband only when she has consulted with Phaedria. And finally at Phormio's suggestion, she invites Phormio to dinner.

== Translations ==
- English translation by Henry Thomas Riley at Perseus: Phormio
