= Apollodorus (jurist) =

Graeco-Roman jurist

Apollodorus was a Graeco-Roman jurist of the 5th century AD, who was one of the commission appointed by Theodosius II to compile the Codex Theodosianus. In the year 429 he appears as comes and magister memoriae, and he appears as comes sacri consistorii in the years 435 and 438. There seems to be no reason, beyond sameness of name and nearness of date, to identify him with the Apollodorus who was comes rei privatae under the emperors Arcadius and Honorius in the year 396, and was proconsul of Africa in the years 399 and 400.

To Apollodorus, proconsul of Africa, are addressed some of the letters of Quintus Aurelius Symmachus, who was connected with him by affinity.
