= Apollodorus (sculptor) =

Apollodorus was a sculptor of ancient Greece, who made statues in bronze. He was so fastidious that he often broke his works in pieces after they were finished, and hence he obtained the surname of "the madman", in which character he was represented by the sculptor Silanion. Assuming from this that the two artists were contemporary, Apollodorus flourished about 324 BCE.

A little further on, Pliny names an Apollodorus among the artists who had made bronze statues of philosophers.

On the base of the Venus de' Medici, Apollodorus is mentioned as the father of the sculptor Cleomenes. Classicist Friedrich Thiersch suggests that he may have been the same person as the subject of this article, for that the statue of the latter by Silanion may have been made from tradition at any time after his death. Apollodorus, however, is so common a Greek name that no such conclusion can be drawn from the mere mention of it.
