= Apollodorus of Telmessus =

Apollodorus of Telmessus is called by Artemidorus a notable or famous man (ἀνὴρ ἐλλόγιμος), and seems to have written a work on dreams. This seems to have specifically been on the subject of Oedipal dreams. His works are now lost.
