= Apollodorus of Cyrene =

Apollodorus of Cyrene (Greek: Ἀπολλόδωρος ὁ Κυρηναῖος) was a grammarian of ancient Greece, who was often cited by other Greek grammarians, as by the Scholiast on Euripides, in the Etymologicum Magnum, and in the Suda. From Athenaeus it would seem that he wrote a work on drinking vessels (ποτήρια), and if we may believe the authority of the 16th-century Italian mythographer Natalis Comes, he also wrote a work on the gods, but this may possibly be a confusion of this Apollodorus with the celebrated grammarian and mythographer Apollodorus of Athens.
