= Apollodorus of Tarsus =

Apollodorus of Tarsus (Greek: Ἀπολλόδωρος ὁ Ταρσεύς) was a tragic poet of ancient Greece, who is mentioned by Eudocia and in the Suda as having written six tragedies (Child-Killer (Τεκνοκτόνος), Greeks (Ἕλληνες), Odysseus (Ὀδυσσεύς), Suppliants (Ἱκέτιδες), Thorn-Scourged (Ἀκανθοπλὴξ), and Thyestes (Θυέστης); only the titles of these plays have survived. Nothing further is known about him.

There is another Apollodorus of Tarsus, who was probably a grammarian, and wrote commentaries on the early dramatic writers of Greece.
