= Apollodorus of Lemnos =

Apollodorus of Lemnos was a writer of ancient Greece who wrote on agriculture. He lived previous to the time of the philosopher Aristotle. He is mentioned by the Roman scholar Marcus Terentius Varro and by Pliny.
