= Apollodorus of Carystus =

Ancient Attic New Comedy writer

Apollodorus of Carystus (Greek: Ἀπολλόδωρος ὁ Καρύστιος) in Euboea, was one of the most important writers of the Attic New Comedy, who flourished in Athens between 300 and 260 B.C. He is to be distinguished from the older Apollodorus of Gela (342—290), a contemporary of Menander who was also a writer of New Comedy. He wrote 47 comedies and obtained the prize five times. Terence's Hecyra and Phormio were adapted from the Hekyra and Epidikazomenos, respectively, of Apollodorus.

== Surviving titles and fragments ==
- Amphiareus ("Amphiaraus")
- Anteuergeton ("Man Who Returns a Kindness")
- Apokarterountes ("People Starving Themselves to Death")
- Apoleipousa ("The Woman Who Leaves")
- Grammateidiopoios ("Maker of Writing Tablets")
- Diabolos ("The Accuser")
- Hekyra ("The Mother-In-Law")
- Ennea ("Nine")
- Epidikazomenos ("The Claimant")
- Hiereia ("The Priestess")
- Proikizomene ("The Woman with a Dowry") or Himatiopolis ("The Female Clothes-Seller")
- Sphattomene ("The Woman Being Slaughtered")

In addition to these twelve plays, there are nine other titles (and associated fragments) which are only credited to "Apollodorus" by the ancient authorities, without specifying whether they were written by Apollodorus of Carystus or Apollodorus of Gela. They are as follows:

- Adelphoi ("Brothers")
- Aphanizomenos ("The Disappearing Man")
- Galatai ("The Galatians")
- Diamartanon ("The Man Who Is Failing Utterly")
- Kitharodos ("The Citharode")
- Lakaina ("The Laconian Woman")
- Paidion ("The Little Child")
- Paralogizomenoi ("The Beguiling Men")
- Synepheboi ("People Who Were Adolescents Together")
