= Apollodorus (general) =

Apollodorus (Ancient Greek: Ἀπολλόδωρος) was an Athenian general of the 4th century BCE. He commanded the Persian auxiliaries which the Athenians had solicited from the king of Persia, Artaxerxes III, against Philip of Macedon in 340. Artaxerxes, who was keen to block the advance of Philip, ordered his satraps to render all aid they could, and the satrap Arsites stepped in to provide mercenaries. Apollodorus became engaged with these troops in protecting the town of Perinthus (modern Marmara Ereğlisi) while Philip invaded its territory. Apollodorus's forces had laid in significant provisions, and successfully repelled the siege.

Apollodorus was buried with civic honors in the Athenian Kerameikos.
