= Apollodorus of Cumae =

Apollodorus (Greek: Ἀπολλόδωρος) was a Greek grammarian from Cumae, who was said to have been the first person that was given the titles of grammarian and critic. According to Pliny, his fame was so great that he was honored by the Amphictyonic council of the Greeks.
