= Apollodorus of Macedonia =

Apollodorus of Macedonia served as secretary to King Philip V of Macedon. He and another scribe of the name of Demosthenes accompanied the king to the colloquy at Nicaea, on the Malian Gulf, with Tiberius Quinctius Flamininus, in 198 BCE.
