= Apollodorus of Susiana =

Apollodorus was a governor, or satrap, of Susiana. He was appointed to this office by the ruler Antiochus III the Great, after the rebellion of his general Molon and his brother Alexander had been put down, in 220 BCE.
