= Loeb Classical Library =

Series of Greek and Latin texts with English translations

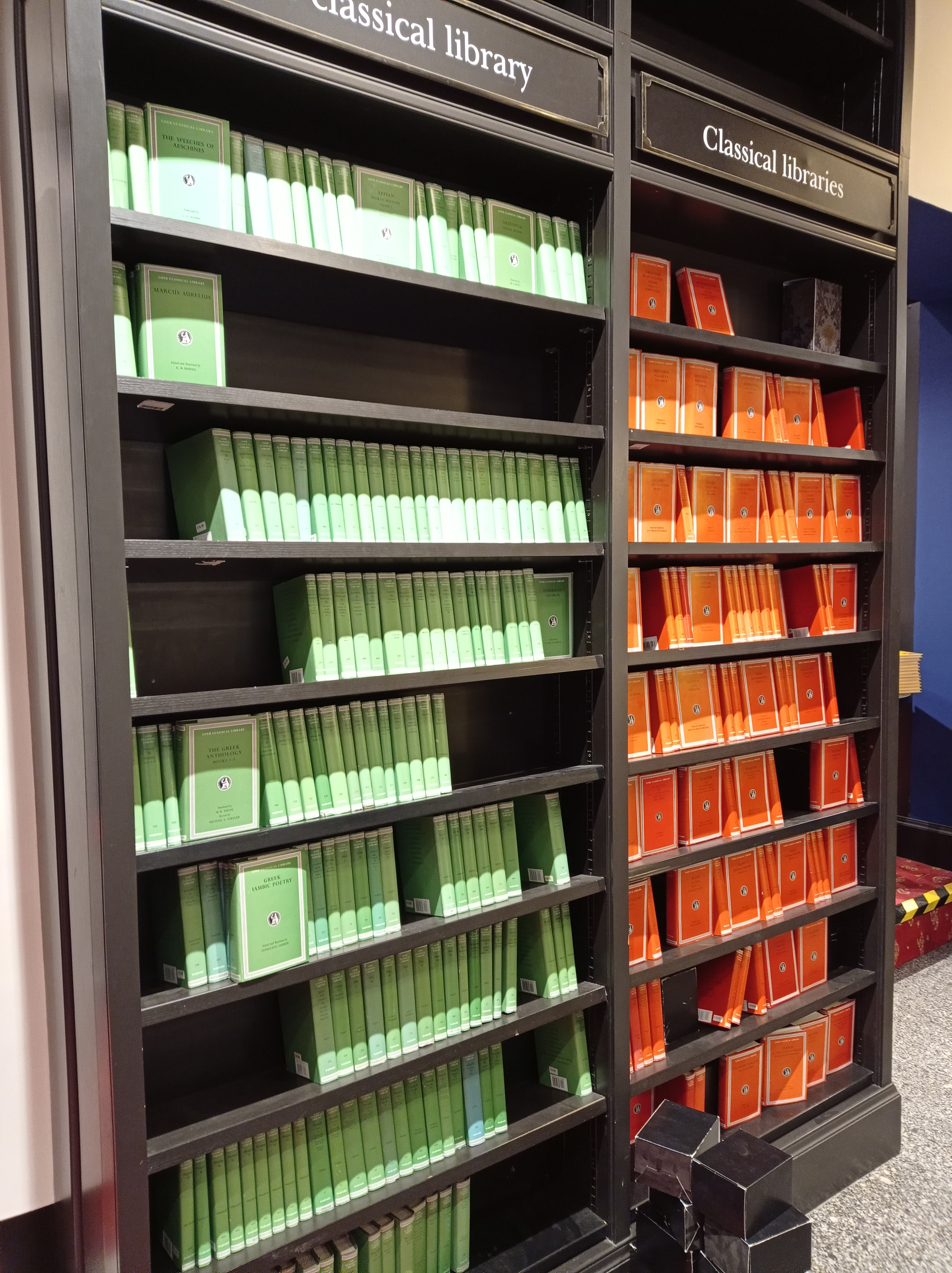
Greek (green) and Latin (red) volumes of the Loeb Classical Library in the Waterstone's bookshop on Gower Street London

Volume 170N of the Greek collection, revised edition

Volume 6 of the Latin collection, second edition 1988

The Loeb Classical Library (LCL; named after James Loeb; /loʊb/, German: [løːp]) is a monographic series of books originally published by Heinemann and since 1934 by Harvard University Press. It has bilingual editions of ancient Greek and Latin literature, with the original Greek or Latin text on the left-hand page and a fairly literal translation on the facing page.

== History ==
Under the inspiration drawn from the book series specializing in publishing classical texts exclusively in the original languages, such as the Bibliotheca Teubneriana, established in 1849 or the Oxford Classical Texts book series, founded in 1894, the Loeb Classical Library was conceived and initially funded by the Jewish-German-American banker and philanthropist James Loeb (1867–1933). The first volumes were edited by Thomas Ethelbert Page, W. H. D. Rouse, and Edward Capps, and published by William Heinemann, Ltd. (London) in 1912, already in their distinctive green (for Greek text) and red (for Latin) hardcover bindings. Since then scores of new titles have been added, and the earliest translations have been revised several times. In recent years, this has included the removal of bowdlerization from earlier editions, which often reversed the gender of the subjects of romantic interest to disguise homosexual references or (in the case of early editions of Longus's Daphnis and Chloe) translated sexually explicit passages from the Ancient Greek into Latin, rather than English.

Since 1934, the library has been co-published with Harvard University. Profit from the editions continues to fund graduate student fellowships at Harvard University.

The Loebs have only a minimal critical apparatus, when compared to other publications of the text. They are intended for the amateur reader of Greek or Latin, and are so nearly ubiquitous as to be instantly recognizable.

In 1917 Virginia Woolf wrote (in The Times Literary Supplement):

The Loeb Library, with its Greek or Latin on one side of the page and its English on the other, came as a gift of freedom. ... The existence of the amateur was recognised by the publication of this Library, and to a great extent made respectable. ... The difficulty of Greek is not sufficiently dwelt upon, chiefly perhaps because the sirens who lure us to these perilous waters are generally scholars [who] have forgotten ... what those difficulties are. But for the ordinary amateur they are very real and very great; and we shall do well to recognise the fact and to make up our minds that we shall never be independent of our Loeb.

Harvard University assumed complete responsibility for the series in 1989 and in recent years four or five new or re-edited volumes have been published annually.

In 2001, Harvard University Press began issuing a second series of books with a similar format. The I Tatti Renaissance Library presents key Renaissance works in Latin with a facing English translation; it is bound similarly to the Loeb Classics, but in a larger format and with blue covers. A third series, the Dumbarton Oaks Medieval Library, was introduced in 2010 covering works in Byzantine Greek, Medieval Latin, and Old English. Volumes have the same format as the I Tatti series, but with a brown cover. The Clay Sanskrit Library, bound in teal cloth, was also modeled on the Loeb Classical Library.

As the command of Latin among generalist historians and archaeologists shrank in the course of the 20th century, professionals came increasingly to rely on these texts designed for amateurs. As Birgitta Hoffmann remarked in 2001 of Tacitus' Agricola: "Unfortunately the first thing that happens in bilingual versions like the Loebs is that most of this apparatus vanishes and, if you use a translation, there is usually no way of knowing that there were problems with the text in the first place."

In 2014, the Loeb Classical Library Foundation and Harvard University Press launched the digital Loeb Classical Library, which they described as "an interconnected, fully searchable, perpetually growing, virtual library of all that is important in Greek and Latin literature".

== Influence ==
The Loeb Library serves as a model to be emulated for:

- The Dumbarton Oaks Medieval Library (medieval Latin, Byzantine Greek, and Old English; bound in pale brown), published by Harvard University Press.
- The Library of Arabic Literature (Arabic, bound in dark blue), published by New York University Press
- The Clay Sanskrit Library (transliterated Sanskrit; bound in teal), published by New York University Press and the JJC Foundation
- The I Tatti Renaissance Library (Italian Renaissance Latin Literature; bound in pale blue), founded in 2001 and published by Harvard University Press;
- The Murty Classical Library of India (various Indian languages and Persian; bound in cerise), founded in 2015 and published by Harvard University Press.
- The Seiyō koten sōsho Western (Greek and Latin) Classics Library, established in 1997 and published by the Kyoto University Press.
- The Biblioteka Renesansowa ("Renaissance Library"), founded in 2008 and published by the Warsaw University Press.
- The Bibliotheca Graecorum et Romanorum Mexicana, founded in 1944 and published by the Institute for Philological Research of the Universidad Nacional Autónoma de México.
- The Col·lecció Fundació Bernat Metge (Greek and Latin Classics), founded in 1922 for publishing critical bilingual editions of classical Greek and Latin texts with parallel Catalan translations.
- The Biblioteca Clásica Gredos, founded in 1977 by the publishing house es:Editorial Gredos in Barcelona, for publishing critical bilingual editions of classical Greek and Latin texts with parallel Spanish translations.
- The Collection Budé, founded in 1920 by the publishing house Les Belles Lettres in Paris, for publishing critical bilingual editions of classical Greek and Latin texts with parallel French translations.
- The Sammlung Tusculum, founded in 1923 by the publishing house de:Ernst-Heimeran-Verlag, for publishing critical bilingual editions of classical Greek and Latin texts with parallel German translations.
- The Scrittori greci e latini book series, founded in 1974 by the publishing house Arnoldo Mondadori Editore in Milan, for publishing critical bilingual editions of classical Greek and Latin texts with parallel Italian translations. In 1991 the publisher established a paperback series of bilingual editions of classics Classici Greci e Latini (Oscar Mondadori), published under the imprint of Oscar Mondadori.
- The Soviet Biblioteka antichnoi literatury Library of Classical (Greek and Latin) Literature (1963–1989), published by the publishing house Khudozhestvennaya Literatura in Moscow, for bringing out critical editions of classical texts in Russian.
- The Biblioteka antychnoi literatury Library of Classical (Greek and Latin) Literature, founded in 2017 by the publishing house Apriori in Lviv, for bringing out critical editions of classical texts in Ukrainian.
- The Clássicos gregos & latinos book series, founded in 1989 by the publishing house Edições 70 in Lisbon, for bringing out critical editions of classical texts in Portuguese.
- The Klassikeroversættelser book series, founded in 2000 by the University Press of Southern Denmark in Odense, for bringing out critical editions of classical texts in Danish.
- The collection Klassieke bibliotheek, published between 1949 and 1954 by the publishing house nl:Uitgeverij en Drukkerij De Spaarnestad in Haarlem, for making the best classical texts available in Dutch.
- The book series Humanitas Yunan ve Latin Klasikleri, founded in the mid-2000s by the publishing house Kabalcı in Istanbul for bringing out critical editions of classical Greek and Latin texts with parallel Turkish translations.
- In Romania, the three following book series have published Greek and Latin originals, alongside Romanian translations, namely, the Biblioteca textelor clasice greceşti şi latineşti (Bucharest: Casa Școalelor, 1919-1928), the Scriitori greci şi latini book series (Bucharest: Editura Academiei Republicii Socialiste România, 1959-1989), and the Clasici latini și greci – Rubicon book series (Oradea: Ratio et Revelatio, 2021-).

== Volumes ==
The listings of Loeb volumes at online bookstores and library catalogues vary considerably and are often best navigated via ISBNs.

=== Greek ===
==== Poetry ====
===== Homer =====
- L170N) Iliad, Second Edition: Volume I. Books 1–12. ISBN 978-0-674-99579-6.
- L171N) Iliad: Volume II. Books 13–24. ISBN 978-0-674-99580-2.
- L104) Odyssey: Volume I. Books 1–12. ISBN 978-0-674-99561-1.
- L105) Odyssey: Volume II. Books 13–24. ISBN 978-0-674-99562-8.

===== Hesiod =====
- L057N) Volume I. Theogony. Works and Days. Testimonia. ISBN 978-0-674-99720-2.
- L503) Volume II. The Shield. Catalogue of Women. Other Fragments. ISBN 978-0-674-99721-9.

===== Nonnus =====
- L344) Dionysiaca: Volume I. Books 1–15 ISBN 978-0674993792.
- L354) Dionysiaca: Volume II. Books 16–35 ISBN 978-0674993914.
- L356) Dionysiaca: Volume III. Books 36–48 ISBN 978-0674993938.

===== Other epic poetry =====
- L496) Homeric Hymns. Homeric Apocrypha. Lives of Homer. ISBN 0674996062.
- L497) Greek Epic Fragments (including the Epic Cycle). ISBN 0674996054.
- L001) Apollonius Rhodius: Argonautica. ISBN 0674990013.
- L019N) Quintus Smyrnaeus: Posthomerica. ISBN 0674997166.
- L219) Oppian, Colluthus, and Tryphiodorus. ISBN 0674992415.
- L562) Orphic Collection. ISBN 978-0674997783.

===== Lyric, iambic and elegiac poetry =====
- L142) Greek Lyric Poetry: Volume I. Sappho and Alcaeus
- L143) Greek Lyric Poetry: Volume II. Anacreon, Anacreontea, Choral Lyric from Olympus to Alcman
- L476) Greek Lyric Poetry: Volume III. Stesichorus, Ibycus, Simonides, and Others
- L461) Greek Lyric Poetry: Volume IV. Bacchylides, Corinna, and Others
- L144) Greek Lyric Poetry: Volume V. The New School of Poetry and Anonymous Songs and Hymns
- L258N) Greek Elegiac Poetry: From the Seventh to the Fifth Centuries BC. Tyrtaeus, Solon, Theognis, and Others
- L259N) Greek Iambic Poetry: From the Seventh to the Fifth Centuries BC. Archilochus, Semonides, Hipponax, and Others
- L056) Pindar: Volume I. Olympian Odes. Pythian Odes. ISBN 978-0-674-99564-2.
- L485) Pindar: Volume II. Nemean Odes. Isthmian Odes. Fragments. ISBN 978-0-674-99534-5.

===== Other Hellenistic poetry =====
- L129) Callimachus: Hymns, Epigrams. Lycophron. Aratus.
- L421) Callimachus: Aetia, Iambi, Hecale and Other Fragments. Hero and Leander
- L550) Callimachus: Miscellaneous Epics and Elegies. Other Fragments. Testimonia
- L028) Greek Bucolic Poets: Theocritus. Bion. Moschus
- L508) Hellenistic Collection: Philitas. Alexander of Aetolia. Hermesianax. Euphorion. Parthenius

===== Greek Anthology =====
- L067) Volume I. Book 1: Christian Epigrams. Book 2: Christodorus of Thebes in Egypt. Book 3: The Cyzicene Epigrams. Book 4: The Proems of the Different Anthologies. Book 5: The Amatory Epigrams. Book 6: The Dedicatory Epigrams
- L068) Volume II. Book 7: Sepulchral Epigrams. Book 8: The Epigrams of St. Gregory the Theologian
- L084) Volume III. Book 9: The Declamatory Epigrams
- L085) Volume IV. Book 10: The Hortatory and Admonitory Epigrams. Book 11: The Convivial and Satirical Epigrams. Book 12: Strato's Musa Puerilis
- L086) Volume V. Book 13: Epigrams in Various Metres. Book 14: Arithmetical Problems, Riddles, Oracles. Book 15: Miscellanea. Book 16: Epigrams of the Planudean Anthology Not in the Palatine Manuscript

==== Drama ====
===== Aeschylus =====
- L145N) Volume I. Persians. Seven Against Thebes. Suppliant Maidens. Prometheus Bound. ISBN 978-0-674-99627-4.
- L146N) Volume II. Oresteia: Agamemnon. Libation-Bearers. Eumenides. ISBN 978-0-674-99628-1.
- L505) Volume III. Fragments. ISBN 978-0-674-99629-8.

===== Sophocles =====
- L020) Volume I. Ajax. Electra. Oedipus Tyrannus ISBN 0-674-99557-0
- L021) Volume II. Antigone. The Women of Trachis. Philoctetes. Oedipus at Colonus ISBN 0-674-99558-9
- L483) Volume III. Fragments ISBN 0-674-99532-5

===== Euripides =====
- L012) Volume I. Cyclops. Alcestis. Medea
- L484) Volume II. Children of Heracles. Hippolytus. Andromache. Hecuba
- L009) Volume III. Suppliant Women. Electra. Heracles
- L010N) Volume IV. Trojan Women. Iphigenia among the Taurians. Ion
- L011N) Volume V. Helen. Phoenician Women. Orestes
- L495) Volume VI. Bacchae. Iphigenia at Aulis. Rhesus
- L504) Volume VII. Fragments: Aegeus-Meleager. ISBN 978-0-674-99625-0.
- L506) Volume VIII. Fragments: Oedipus-Chrysippus. Other Fragments. ISBN 978-0-674-99631-1.

===== Aristophanes =====
- L178) Volume I. Acharnians. Knights
- L488) Volume II. Clouds. Wasps. Peace
- L179N) Volume III. Birds. Lysistrata. Women at the Thesmophoria
- L180N) Volume IV. Frogs. Assemblywomen. Wealth
- L502) Volume V. Fragments ISBN 0-674-99615-1

===== Fragments of Old Comedy =====
- L513) Volume I. Alcaeus to Diocles
- L514) Volume II. Diopeithes to Pherecrates
- L515) Volume III. Philonicus to Xenophon. Adespota

===== Menander =====
- L132) Volume I. Aspis. Georgos. Dis Exapaton. Dyskolos. Encheiridion. Epitrepontes
- L459) Volume II. Heros. Theophoroumene. Karchedonios. Kitharistes. Kolax. Koneiazomenai. Leukadia. Misoumenos. Perikeiromene. Perinthia
- L460N) Volume III. Samia. Sikyonioi. Synaristosai. Phasma. Unidentified Fragments

==== Philosophers ====
===== Early Greek Philosophy =====
- L524) Volume I. Introductory and Reference Materials
- L525) Volume II. Beginnings and Early Ionian Thinkers, Part 1
- L526) Volume III. Early Ionian Thinkers, Part 2
- L527) Volume IV. Western Greek Thinkers, Part 1
- L528) Volume V. Western Greek Thinkers, Part 2
- L529) Volume VI. Later Ionian and Athenian Thinkers, Part 1
- L530) Volume VII. Later Ionian and Athenian Thinkers, Part 2
- L531) Volume VIII. Sophists, Part 1
- L532) Volume IX. Sophists, Part 2

===== Aetius =====
- L555) Placita

===== Aristotle =====
- L325) Volume I. Categories. On Interpretation. Prior Analytics ISBN 0-674-99359-4
- L391) Volume II. Posterior Analytics. Topica ISBN 0-674-99430-2
- L400) Volume III. On Sophistical Refutations. On Coming-to-be and Passing Away. On the Cosmos ISBN 0-674-99441-8
- L228) Volume IV. Physics, Books 1–4 ISBN 0-674-99251-2
- L255) Volume V. Physics, Books 5–8 ISBN 0-674-99281-4
- L338) Volume VI. On the Heavens ISBN 0-674-99372-1
- L397) Volume VII. Meteorologica ISBN 0-674-99436-1
- L288) Volume VIII. On the Soul. Parva Naturalia. On Breath ISBN 0-674-99318-7
- L437) Volume IX. History of Animals, Books 1–3 ISBN 0-674-99481-7
- L438) Volume X. History of Animals, Books 4–6 ISBN 0-674-99482-5
- L439) Volume XI. History of Animals, Books 7–10 ISBN 0-674-99483-3
- L323) Volume XII. Parts of Animals. Movement of Animals. Progression of Animals ISBN 0-674-99357-8
- L366) Volume XIII. Generation of Animals ISBN 0-674-99403-5
- L307) Volume XIV. Minor Works: On Colours. On Things Heard. Physiognomics. On Plants. On Marvellous Things Heard. Mechanical Problems. On Indivisible Lines. The Situations and Names of Winds. On Melissus, Xenophanes, Gorgias ISBN 0-674-99338-1
- L316) Volume XV. Problems, Books 1–21 ISBN 0-674-99349-7
- L317) Volume XVI. Problems, Books 22–38. Rhetorica ad Alexandrum ISBN 0-674-99350-0
- L271) Volume XVII. Metaphysics, Books 1–9 ISBN 0-674-99299-7
- L287) Volume XVIII. Metaphysics, Books 10–14. Oeconomica. Magna Moralia ISBN 0-674-99317-9
- L073) Volume XIX. Nicomachean Ethics ISBN 0-674-99081-1
- L285) Volume XX. Athenian Constitution. Eudemian Ethics. Virtues and Vices ISBN 0-674-99315-2
- L264) Volume XXI. Politics ISBN 0-674-99291-1
- L193) Volume XXII. The Art of Rhetoric ISBN 0-674-99212-1
- L199) Volume XXIII. Poetics. Longinus, On the Sublime. Demetrius, On Style ISBN 0-674-99563-5

===== Athenaeus =====
- L204) The Deipnosophists: Volume I. Books 1–3.106e
- L208) The Deipnosophists: Volume II. Books 3.106e-5
- L224) The Deipnosophists: Volume III. Books 6–7
- L235) The Deipnosophists: Volume IV. Books 8–10
- L274) The Deipnosophists: Volume V. Books 11–12
- L327) The Deipnosophists: Volume VI. Books 13–14.653b
- L345) The Deipnosophists: Volume VII. Books 14.653b-15
- L519) The Deipnosophists: Volume VIII. Book 15

===== Epictetus =====
- L131) Volume I. Discourses, Books 1–2
- L218) Volume II. Discourses, Books 3–4. Fragments. The Encheiridion

===== Marcus Aurelius =====
- L058) Collected works

===== Maximus of Tyre =====
- L553) Philosophical Orations: Volume I
- L554) Philosophical Orations: Volume 2

===== Philo =====
- L226) Volume I. On the Creation. Allegorical Interpretation of Genesis 2 and 3
- L227) Volume II. On the Cherubim. The Sacrifices of Abel and Cain. The Worse Attacks the Better. On the Posterity and Exile of Cain. On the Giants
- L247) Volume III. On the Unchangeableness of God. On Husbandry. Concerning Noah's Work As a Planter. On Drunkenness. On Sobriety
- L261) Volume IV. On the Confusion of Tongues. On the Migration of Abraham. Who Is the Heir of Divine Things? On Mating with the Preliminary Studies
- L275) Volume V. On Flight and Finding. On the Change of Names. On Dreams
- L289) Volume VI. On Abraham. On Joseph. On Moses
- L320) Volume VII. On the Decalogue. On the Special Laws, Books 1–3
- L341) Volume VIII. On the Special Laws, Book 4. On the Virtues. On Rewards and Punishments
- L363) Volume IX. Every Good Man is Free. On the Contemplative Life. On the Eternity of the World. Against Flaccus. Apology for the Jews. On Providence
- L379) Volume X. On the Embassy to Gaius. General Indexes
- L380) Supplement I: Questions and Answers on Genesis
- L401) Supplement II: Questions and Answers on Exodus

===== Plato =====
- L036) Volume I. Euthyphro. Apology. Crito. Phaedo. Phaedrus ISBN 0-674-99040-4
- L036N) Volume I. Euthyphro. Apology. Crito. Phaedo.
- L165) Volume II. Laches. Protagoras. Meno. Euthydemus ISBN 0-674-99183-4
- L166) Volume III. Lysis. Symposium. Gorgias ISBN 0-674-99184-2
- L166N) Volume III. Lysis. Symposium. Phaedrus ISBN 0-674-99743-3
- L167) Volume IV. Cratylus. Parmenides. Greater Hippias. Lesser Hippias ISBN 0-674-99185-0
- L237) Volume V. The Republic, Books 1–5 ISBN 0-674-99262-8
- L276) Volume VI. The Republic, Books 6–10 ISBN 0-674-99304-7
- L123) Volume VII. Theaetetus. Sophist ISBN 0-674-99137-0
- L164) Volume VIII. Statesman. Philebus. Ion ISBN 0-674-99182-6
- L234) Volume IX. Timaeus. Critias. Cleitophon. Menexenus. Epistles ISBN 0-674-99257-1
- L187) Volume X. Laws, Books 1–6 ISBN 0-674-99206-7
- L192) Volume XI. Laws, Books 7–12 ISBN 0-674-99211-3
- L201) Volume XII. Charmides. Alcibiades 1 & 2. Hipparchus. The Lovers. Theages. Minos. Epinomis ISBN 0-674-99221-0
- L561) Volume XIII. Euthydemus. Gorgias ISBN 0-674-99769-7

===== Plotinus =====
- L440) Volume I. Porphyry's Life of Plotinus. Ennead 1
- L441) Volume II. Ennead 2
- L442) Volume III. Ennead 3
- L443) Volume IV. Ennead 4
- L444) Volume V. Ennead 5
- L445) Volume VI. Ennead 6.1–5
- L468) Volume VII. Ennead 6.6–9

===== Plutarch =====
- L197) Moralia: Volume I. The Education of Children. How the Young Man Should Study Poetry. On Listening to Lectures. How to Tell a Flatterer from a Friend. How a Man May Become Aware of His Progress in Virtue
- L222) Moralia: Volume II. How to Profit by One's Enemies. On Having Many Friends. Chance. Virtue and Vice. Letter of Condolence to Apollonius. Advice About Keeping Well. Advice to Bride and Groom. The Dinner of the Seven Wise Men. Superstition
- L245) Moralia: Volume III. Sayings of Kings and Commanders. Sayings of Romans. Sayings of Spartans. The Ancient Customs of the Spartans. Sayings of Spartan Women. Bravery of Women
- L305) Moralia: Volume IV. Roman Questions. Greek Questions. Greek and Roman Parallel Stories. On the Fortune of the Romans. On the Fortune or the Virtue of Alexander. Were the Athenians More Famous in War or in Wisdom?
- L306) Moralia: Volume V. Isis and Osiris. The E at Delphi. The Oracles at Delphi No Longer Given in Verse. The Obsolescence of Oracles
- L337) Moralia: Volume VI. Can Virtue Be Taught? On Moral Virtue. On the Control of Anger. On Tranquility of Mind. On Brotherly Love. On Affection for Offspring. Whether Vice Be Sufficient to Cause Unhappiness. Whether the Affections of the Soul are Worse Than Those of the Body. Concerning Talkativeness. On Being a Busybody
- L405) Moralia: Volume VII. On Love of Wealth. On Compliancy. On Envy and Hate. On Praising Oneself Inoffensively. On the Delays of the Divine Vengeance. On Fate. On the Sign of Socrates. On Exile. Consolation to His Wife
- L424) Moralia: Volume VIII. Table-talk, Books 1–6
- L425) Moralia: Volume IX. Table-Talk, Books 7–9. Dialogue on Love
- L321) Moralia: Volume X. Love Stories. That a Philosopher Ought to Converse Especially With Men in Power. To an Uneducated Ruler. Whether an Old Man Should Engage in Public Affairs. Precepts of Statecraft. On Monarchy, Democracy, and Oligarchy. That We Ought Not To Borrow. Lives of the Ten Orators. Summary of a Comparison Between Aristophanes and Menander
- L426) Moralia: Volume XI. On the Malice of Herodotus. Causes of Natural Phenomena
- L406) Moralia: Volume XII. Concerning the Face Which Appears in the Orb of the Moon. On the Principle of Cold. Whether Fire or Water Is More Useful. Whether Land or Sea Animals Are Cleverer. Beasts Are Rational. On the Eating of Flesh
- L427) Moralia: Volume XIII. Part 1. Platonic Essays
- L470) Moralia: Volume XIII. Part 2. Stoic Essays
- L428) Moralia: Volume XIV. That Epicurus Actually Makes a Pleasant Life Impossible. Reply to Colotes in Defence of the Other Philosophers. Is "Live Unknown" a Wise Precept? On Music
- L429) Moralia: Volume XV. Fragments
- L499) Moralia: Volume XVI. Index

===== Ptolemy =====
- L435) Tetrabiblos

===== Sextus Empiricus =====
- L273) Volume I. Outlines of Pyrrhonism
- L291) Volume II. Against the Logicians
- L311) Volume III. Against the Physicists. Against the Ethicists
- L382) Volume IV. Against the Professors

===== Theophrastus =====
- L070) Enquiry into Plants: Volume I. Books 1–5
- L079) Enquiry into Plants: Volume II. Books 6–9. Treatise on Odours. Concerning Weather Signs
- L225) Characters. Mimes. Cercidas and the Choliambic Poets
- L225N) Characters. Herodas, Mimes. Sophron and Other Mime Fragments
- L471) De Causis Plantarum: Volume I. Books 1–2
- L474) De Causis Plantarum: Volume II. Books 3–4
- L475) De Causis Plantarum: Volume III. Books 5–6

===== Greek Mathematics (extracts) =====
- L335) Greek Mathematical Works: Volume I. From Thales to Euclid. ISBN 978-0-674-99369-3.
- L362) Greek Mathematical Works: Volume II. From Aristarchus to Pappus. ISBN 978-0-674-99399-0.

==== Historians ====
===== Appian =====
- L002N) Roman History: Volume I. Books 1–7 (New edition by Brian McGing)
- L003N) Roman History: Volume II. Books 8–10 (New edition by Brian McGing)
- L004N) Roman History: Volume III. Books 11–12 (New edition by Brian McGing)
- L005N) Roman History: Volume IV. Civil Wars, Books 1–2 (New edition by Brian McGing)
- L543) Roman History: Volume V: Civil Wars, Books 3–4
- L544) Roman History: Volume VI: Civil Wars, Book 5. Fragments

===== Arrian =====
- L236) Volume I. Anabasis of Alexander, Books 1–4
- L269) Volume II. Anabasis of Alexander, Books 5–7. Indica

===== Dio Cassius =====
- L032) Roman History: Volume I. Fragments of Books 1–11
- L037) Roman History: Volume II. Fragments of Books 12–35 and of Uncertain Reference
- L053) Roman History: Volume III. Books 36–40
- L066) Roman History: Volume IV. Books 41–45
- L082) Roman History: Volume V. Books 46–50
- L083) Roman History: Volume VI. Books 51–55
- L175) Roman History: Volume VII. Books 56–60
- L176) Roman History: Volume VIII. Books 61–70
- L177) Roman History: Volume IX. Books 71–80

===== Diodorus Siculus =====
- L279) Volume I. Library of History, Books 1–2.34. ISBN 978-0-674-99307-5.
- L303) Volume II. Library of History, Books 2.35–4.58. ISBN 978-0-674-99334-1.
- L340) Volume III. Library of History, Books 4.59–8. ISBN 978-0-674-99375-4.
- L375) Volume IV. Library of History, Books 9–12.40. ISBN 978-0-674-99413-3.
- L384) Volume V. Library of History, Books 12.41–13. ISBN 978-0-674-99422-5.
- L399) Volume VI. Library of History, Books 14–15.19. ISBN 978-0-674-99439-3.
- L389) Volume VII. Library of History, Books 15.20–16.65. ISBN 978-0-674-99428-7.
- L422) Volume VIII. Library of History, Books 16.66–17
- L377) Volume IX. Library of History, Books 18–19.65
- L390) Volume X. Library of History, Books 19.66–20
- L409) Volume XI. Library of History, Fragments of Books 21–32
- L423) Volume XII. Library of History, Fragments of Books 33–40

===== Herodian =====
- L454) History of the Empire: Volume I. Books 1–4
- L455) History of the Empire: Volume II. Books 5–8

===== Herodotus =====
- L117) The Persian Wars: Volume I. Books 1–2. ISBN 0-674-99130-3
- L118) The Persian Wars: Volume II. Books 3–4. ISBN 0-674-99131-1
- L119) The Persian Wars: Volume III. Books 5–7. ISBN 0-674-99133-8
- L120) The Persian Wars: Volume IV. Books 8–9. ISBN 0-674-99134-6

===== Josephus =====
- L186) Volume I. The Life of Flavius Josephus. Against Apion
- L203) Volume II. The Jewish War, Books 1–2
- L487) Volume III. The Jewish War, Books 3–4
- L210) Volume IV. The Jewish War, Books 5–7:
- L242) Volume V. Jewish Antiquities, Books 1–3
- L490) Volume VI. Jewish Antiquities, Books 4–6
- L281) Volume VII. Jewish Antiquities, Books 7–8
- L326) Volume VIII. Jewish Antiquities, Books 9–11
- L365) Volume IX. Jewish Antiquities, Books 12–13
- L489) Volume X. Jewish Antiquities, Books 14–15
- L410) Volume XI. Jewish Antiquities, Books 16–17
- L433) Volume XII. Jewish Antiquities, Books 18–19
- L456) Volume XIII. Jewish Antiquities, Book 20

===== Manetho =====
- L350) History of Egypt and Other Works

===== Polybius =====
- L128) Histories: Volume I. Books 1–2
- L137) Histories: Volume II. Books 3–4
- L138) Histories: Volume III. Books 5–8
- L159) Histories: Volume IV. Books 9–15
- L160) Histories: Volume V. Books 16–27
- L161) Histories: Volume VI. Books 28–39

===== Procopius =====
- L048) Volume I. History of the Wars, Books 1–2. (Persian War)
- L081) Volume II. History of the Wars, Books 3–4. (Vandalic War)
- L107) Volume III. History of the Wars, Books 5–6.15. (Gothic War)
- L173) Volume IV. History of the Wars, Books 6.16–7.35. (Gothic War)
- L217) Volume V. History of the Wars, Books 7.36–8. (Gothic War)
- L290) Volume VI. The Anecdota or Secret History
- L343) Volume VII. On Buildings. General Index

===== Thucydides =====
- L108) History of the Peloponnesian War: Volume I. Books 1–2. ISBN 978-0-674-99120-0.
- L109) History of the Peloponnesian War: Volume II. Books 3–4. ISBN 978-0-674-99121-7.
- L110) History of the Peloponnesian War: Volume III. Books 5–6. ISBN 978-0-674-99122-4.
- L169) History of the Peloponnesian War: Volume IV. Books 7–8. General Index. ISBN 978-0-674-99187-3.

===== Xenophon =====
- L088) Volume I. Hellenica, Books 1–4
- L089) Volume II. Hellenica, Books 5–7
- L090) Volume III. Anabasis
- L168) Volume IV. Memorabilia and Oeconomicus. Symposium and Apologia
- L051) Volume V. Cyropaedia, Books 1–4
- L052) Volume VI. Cyropaedia, Books 5–8
- L183) Volume VII. Hiero. Agesilaus. Constitution of the Lacedaemonians. Ways and Means. Cavalry Commander. Art of Horsemanship. On Hunting. Old Oligarch: Constitution of the Athenians

==== Attic orators ====
===== Aeschines =====
- L106) Collected works

===== Demosthenes =====
- L238) Volume I. Olynthiacs 1–3. Philippic 1. On the Peace. Philippic 2. On Halonnesus. On the Chersonese. Philippics 3 and 4. Answer to Philip's Letter. Philip's Letter. On Organization. On the Navy-boards. For the Liberty of the Rhodians. For the People of Meg
- L155) Volume II. De Corona, De Falsa Legatione (18–19)
- L299) Volume III. Against Meidias. Against Androtion. Against Aristocrates. Against Timocrates. Against Aristogeiton 1 and 2 (21–26)
- L318) Volume IV. Private Orations (27–40)
- L346) Volume V. Private Orations (41–49)
- L351) Volume VI. Private Orations (50–58). Against Neaera (59)
- L374) Volume VII. Funeral Speech (60). Erotic Essay (61). Exordia. Letters

===== Isaeus =====
- L202) Collected works

===== Isocrates =====
- L209) Volume I. To Demonicus. To Nicocles. Nicocles or the Cyprians. Panegyricus. To Philip. Archidamus
- L229) Volume II. On the Peace. Areopagiticus. Against the Sophists. Antidosis. Panathenaicus
- L373) Volume III. Evagoras. Helen. Busiris. Plataicus. Concerning the Team of Horses. Trapeziticus. Against Callimachus. Aegineticus. Against Lochites. Against Euthynus. Letters

===== Lysias =====
- L244) Collected works

===== Minor Attic Orators =====
- L308) Minor Attic Orators: Volume I. Antiphon and Andocides
- L395) Minor Attic Orators: Volume II. Lycurgus. Dinarchus. Demades. Hyperides

==== Biography ====
===== Plutarch =====
- L046) Parallel Lives: Volume I. Theseus and Romulus. Lycurgus and Numa. Solon and Publicola
- L047) Parallel Lives: Volume II. Themistocles and Camillus. Aristides and Cato Major. Cimon and Lucullus
- L065) Parallel Lives: Volume III. Pericles and Fabius Maximus. Nicias and Crassus
- L080) Parallel Lives: Volume IV. Alcibiades and Coriolanus. Lysander and Sulla
- L087) Parallel Lives: Volume V. Agesilaus and Pompey. Pelopidas and Marcellus
- L098) Parallel Lives: Volume VI. Dion and Brutus. Timoleon and Aemilius Paulus
- L099) Parallel Lives: Volume VII. Demosthenes and Cicero. Alexander and Julius Caesar
- L100) Parallel Lives: Volume VIII. Sertorius and Eumenes. Phocion and Cato the Younger
- L101) Parallel Lives: Volume IX. Demetrius and Antony. Pyrrhus and Gaius Marius
- L102) Parallel Lives: Volume X. Agis and Cleomenes. Tiberius and Gaius Gracchus. Philopoemen and Flamininus
- L103) Parallel Lives: Volume XI. Aratus. Artaxerxes. Galba. Otho. General Index

===== Diogenes Laërtius =====
- L184) Lives of Eminent Philosophers: Volume I. Books 1–5
- L185) Lives of Eminent Philosophers: Volume II. Books 6–10

===== Philostratus =====
- L016) Life of Apollonius of Tyana: Volume I. Books 1–5
- L017) Life of Apollonius of Tyana: Volume II. Books 6–8. Epistles of Apollonius. Eusebius: Treatise
- L458) Life of Apollonius of Tyana: Volume III. Letters of Apollonius, Ancient Testimonia, Eusebius′s Reply to Hierocles
- L134) Lives of the Sophists. Eunapius: Lives of the Philosophers and Sophists

==== Ancient Greek novel ====
- L481) Chariton: Callirhoe
- L045) Achilles Tatius: Leucippe and Clitophon
- L069) Longus: Daphnis and Chloe. Xenophon of Ephesus: Anthia and Habrocomes
- L565) Heliodorus: Ethiopian Story. Books 1–5
- L566) Heliodorus: Ethiopian Story. Books 6–10

==== Greek Fathers ====
===== Basil =====
- L190) Letters: Volume I. Letters 1–58
- L215) Letters: Volume II. Letters 59–185
- L243) Letters: Volume III. Letters 186–248
- L270) Letters: Volume IV. Letters 249–368. Address to Young Men on Greek Literature

===== Clement of Alexandria =====
- L092) The Exhortation to the Greeks. The Rich Man's Salvation. To the Newly Baptized (fragment)

===== Eusebius =====
- L153) Ecclesiastical History: Volume I. Books 1–5
- L265) Ecclesiastical History: Volume II. Books 6–10

===== John Damascene =====
- L034) Barlaam and Ioasaph

===== Apostolic Fathers =====
(edited by Bart Ehrman, replacing Kirsopp Lake's edition)

- L024) Apostolic Fathers: Volume I. I Clement. II Clement. Ignatius. Polycarp. Didache. Barnabas
- L025) Apostolic Fathers: Volume II. Shepherd of Hermas. Martyrdom of Polycarp. Epistle to Diognetus

==== Other Greek prose ====
===== Aelian =====
- L446) On the Characteristics of Animals: Volume I. Books 1–5
- L448) On the Characteristics of Animals: Volume II. Books 6–11
- L449) On the Characteristics of Animals: Volume III. Books 12–17
- L486) Historical Miscellany

===== Aelius Aristides =====
- L533) Orations: Volume I
- L545) Orations: Volume II
- L563) Orations: Volume III

===== Aeneas Tacticus =====
- L156) Aeneas Tacticus, Asclepiodotus, and Onasander

===== Babrius and Phaedrus =====
- L436) Fables ISBN 0-674-99480-9

===== Alciphron =====
- L383) Alciphron, Aelian, and Philostratus: The Letters

===== Apollodorus =====
- L121) The Library: Volume I. Books 1–3.9
- L122) The Library: Volume II. Book 3.10-end. Epitome

===== Dio Chrysostom =====
- L257) Discourses 1–11: Volume I
- L339) Discourses 12–30: Volume II
- L358) Discourses 31–36: Volume III
- L376) Discourses 37–60: Volume IV
- L385) Discourses 61–80. Fragments. Letters: Volume V

===== Dionysius of Halicarnassus =====
- L319) Roman Antiquities: Volume I. Books 1–2
- L347) Roman Antiquities: Volume II. Books 3–4
- L357) Roman Antiquities: Volume III. Books 5–6.48
- L364) Roman Antiquities: Volume IV. Books 6.49–7
- L372) Roman Antiquities: Volume V. Books 8–9.24
- L378) Roman Antiquities: Volume VI. Books 9.25–10
- L388) Roman Antiquities: Volume VII. Book 11. Fragments of Books 12–20
- L465) Critical Essays: Volume I. Ancient Orators. Lysias. Isocrates. Isaeus. Demosthenes. Thucydides
- L466) Critical Essays: Volume II. On Literary Composition. Dinarchus. Letters to Ammaeus and Pompeius

===== Galen =====
- L071) On the Natural Faculties
- L516) Method of Medicine: Volume I. Books 1–4
- L517) Method of Medicine: Volume II. Books 5–9
- L518) Method of Medicine: Volume III. Books 10–14
- L523) On the Constitution of the Art of Medicine. The Art of Medicine. A Method of Medicine to Glaucon
- L535) Hygiene: Volume I. Books 1–4
- L536) Hygiene: Volume II. Books 5–6. Thrasybulus. On Exercise with a Small Ball.
- L546) On Temperaments. On Non-Uniform Distemperment. The Soul’s Traits Depend on Bodily Temperament

===== Hippocrates =====
- L147) Volume I. Ancient Medicine. Airs, Waters, Places. Epidemics 1 & 3. The Oath. Precepts. Nutriment
- L148) Volume II. Prognostic. Regimen in Acute Diseases. The Sacred Disease. The Art. Breaths. Law. Decorum. Physician (Ch. 1). Dentition
- L149) Volume III. On Wounds in the Head. In the Surgery. On Fractures. On Joints. Mochlicon
- L150) Volume IV. Nature of Man. Regimen in Health. Humours. Aphorisms. Regimen 1–3. Dreams. Heracleitus: On the Universe
- L472) Volume V. Affections. Diseases 1. Diseases 2
- L473) Volume VI. Diseases 3. Internal Affections. Regimen in Acute Diseases (Appendix)
- L477) Volume VII. Epidemics 2, 4–7
- L482) Volume VIII. Places in Man. Glands. Fleshes. Prorrhetic 1–2. Physician. Use of Liquids. Ulcers. Haemorrhoids. Fistulas
- L509) Volume IX. Anatomy. Nature of Bones. Heart. Eight Months' Child. Coan Prenotions. Crises. Critical Days. Superfetation. Girls. Excision of the Fetus. Sight
- L520) Volume X. Generation. Nature of the Child. Diseases 4. Nature of Women. Barrenness
- L538) Volume XI. Diseases of Women 1–2

===== Julian =====
- L013) Volume I. Orations 1–5
- L029) Volume II. Orations 6–8. Letters to Themistius, To the Senate and People of Athens, To a Priest. The Caesars. Misopogon
- L157) Volume III. Letters. Epigrams. Against the Galilaeans. Fragments

===== Libanius =====
- L451) Selected Orations: Volume I. Julianic Orations
- L452) Selected Orations: Volume II. Orations 2, 19–23, 30, 33, 45, 47–50
- L478) Autobiography and Selected Letters: Volume I. Autobiography. Letters 1–50
- L479) Autobiography and Selected Letters: Volume II. Letters 51–193

===== Lucian =====
- L014) Volume I. Phalaris. Hippias or The Bath. Dionysus. Heracles. Amber or The Swans. The Fly. Nigrinus. Demonax. The Hall. My Native Land. Octogenarians. A True Story. Slander. The Consonants at Law. The Carousal (Symposium) or The Lapiths
- L054) Volume II. The Downward Journey or The Tyrant. Zeus Catechized. Zeus Rants. The Dream or The Cock. Prometheus. Icaromenippus or The Sky-man. Timon or The Misanthrope. Charon or The Inspectors. Philosophies for Sale
- L130) Volume III. The Dead Come to Life or The Fisherman. The Double Indictment or Trials by Jury. On Sacrifices. The Ignorant Book Collector. The Dream or Lucian's Career. The Parasite. The Lover of Lies. The Judgement of the Goddesses. On Salaried Posts in Great Houses
- L162) Volume IV. Anacharsis or Athletics. Menippus or The Descent into Hades. On Funerals. A Professor of Public Speaking. Alexander the False Prophet. Essays in Portraiture. Essays in Portraiture Defended. The Goddesse of Surrye
- L302) Volume V. The Passing of Peregrinus. The Runaways. Toxaris or Friendship. The Dance. Lexiphanes. The Eunuch. Astrology. The Mistaken Critic. The Parliament of the Gods. The Tyrannicide. Disowned
- L430) Volume VI. How to Write History. The Dipsads. Saturnalia. Herodotus or Aetion. Zeuxis or Antiochus. A Slip of the Tongue in Greeting. Apology for the "Salaried Posts in Great Houses." Harmonides. A Conversation with Hesiod. The Scythian or The Consul. Hermotimus or Concerning the Sects. To One Who Said "You're a Prometheus in Words." The Ship or The Wishes
- L431) Volume VII. Dialogues of the Dead. Dialogues of the Sea-Gods. Dialogues of the Gods. Dialogues of the Courtesans
- L432) Volume VIII. Soloecista. Lucius or The Ass. Amores. Halcyon. Demosthenes. Podagra. Ocypus. Cyniscus. Philopatris. Charidemus. Nero

===== pseudo-Menander Rhetor and pseudo-Dionysius of Halicarnassus =====
- L539) "Menander", Two treatises. "Dionysius", Ars Rhetorica

===== Pausanias =====
- L093) Description of Greece: Volume I. Books 1–2 (Attica and Corinth)
- L188) Description of Greece: Volume II. Books 3–5 (Laconia, Messenia, Elis 1)
- L272) Description of Greece: Volume III. Books 6–8.21 (Elis 2, Achaia, Arcadia)
- L297) Description of Greece: Volume IV. Books 8.22–10 (Arcadia, Boeotia, Phocis and Ozolian Locris)
- L298) Description of Greece: Volume V. Maps, Plans, Illustrations and General Index

===== Philostratus =====
- L521) Heroicus. Gymnasticus. Discourses 1 and 2

===== Philostratus the Elder and Philostratus the Younger =====
- L256) Philostratus the Elder, Imagines. Philostratus the Younger, Imagines. Callistratus, Descriptions

===== Strabo =====
- L049) Geography: Volume I. Books 1–2
- L050) Geography: Volume II. Books 3–5
- L182) Geography: Volume III. Books 6–7
- L196) Geography: Volume IV. Books 8–9
- L211) Geography: Volume V. Books 10–12
- L223) Geography: Volume VI. Books 13–14
- L241) Geography: Volume VII. Books 15–16
- L267) Geography: Volume VIII. Book 17 and General Index

==== Papyri ====
- L266) Volume I. Private Documents (Agreements, Receipts, Wills, Letters, Memoranda, Accounts and Lists, and Others)
- L282) Volume II. Public Documents (Codes and Regulations, Edicts and Orders, Public Announcements, Reports of Meetings, Judicial Business, Petitions and Applications, Declarations to Officials, Contracts, Receipts, Accounts and Lists, Correspondence,
- L360) Volume III. Poetry

=== Latin ===
==== Poetry ====
===== Ausonius =====
- L096) Ausonius: Volume I. Books 1–17
- L115) Ausonius: Volume II. Books 18–20. Paulinus Pellaeus: Eucharisticus

===== Catullus =====
- L006) Also contains the works of Tibullus; Sulpicia; and (Tiberianus?): Pervigilium Veneris

===== Claudian =====
- L135) Volume I. Panegyric on Probinus and Olybrius. Against Rufinus 1 and 2. War Against Gildo. Against Eutropius 1 and 2. Fescennine Verses on the Marriage of Honorius. Epithalamium of Honorius and Maria. Panegyrics on the Third and Fourth Consulships of Honorius
- L136) Volume II. On Stilicho's Consulship 2–3. Panegyric on the Sixth Consulship of Honorius. The Gothic War. Shorter Poems. Rape of Proserpina

===== Horace =====
- L033) Odes and Epodes
- L194) Satires. Epistles. The Art of Poetry

===== Juvenal and Persius =====
- L091) Collected satires ISBN 0-674-99102-8

===== Lucan =====
- L220) The Civil War (Pharsalia)

===== Lucretius =====
- L181) On the Nature of Things

===== Manilius =====
- L469) Astronomica

===== Martial =====
- L094) Epigrams: Volume I. Spectacles, Books 1–5
- L095) Epigrams: Volume II. Books 6–10
- L480) Epigrams: Volume III. Books 11–14

===== Ovid =====
- L041) Volume I. Heroides. Amores
- L232) Volume II. Art of Love. Cosmetics. Remedies for Love. Ibis. Walnut-tree. Sea Fishing. Consolation
- L042) Volume III. Metamorphoses, Books 1–8
- L043) Volume IV. Metamorphoses, Books 9–15
- L253) Volume V. Fasti
- L151) Volume VI. Tristia. Ex Ponto

===== Propertius =====
- L018N) Elegies

===== Sidonius Apollinaris =====
- L296) Volume I. Poems. Letters, Books 1–2
- L420) Volume II. Letters, Books 3–9

===== Silius Italicus =====
- L277) Punica: Volume I. Books 1–8
- L278) Punica: Volume II. Books 9–17

===== Statius =====
- L206N) Volume I. Silvae
- L207N) Volume II. Thebaid, Books 1–7
- L498) Volume III. Thebaid, Books 8–12. Achilleid

===== Valerius Flaccus =====
- L286) Argonautica

===== Virgil =====
- L063N) Volume I. Eclogues. Georgics. Aeneid, Books 1–6
- L064N) Volume II. Aeneid Books 7–12, Appendix Vergiliana

===== Minor Latin Poets edited by J. W. Duff =====
- L284) Minor Latin Poets: Volume I. Publilius Syrus. Elegies on Maecenas. Grattius. Calpurnius Siculus. Laus Pisonis. Einsiedeln Eclogues. Aetna
- L434) Minor Latin Poets: Volume II. Florus. Hadrian. Nemesianus. Reposianus. Tiberianus. Distichs of Cato. Phoenix. Avianus. Rutilius Claudius Namatianus. Others

==== Drama ====
===== Plautus =====
- L060) Volume I. Amphitryon. The Comedy of Asses. The Pot of Gold. The Two Bacchises. The Captives
- L061) Volume II. Casina. The Casket Comedy. Curculio. Epidicus. The Two Menaechmuses
- L163) Volume III. The Merchant. The Braggart Soldier. The Ghost. The Persian
- L260) Volume IV. The Little Carthaginian. Pseudolus. The Rope
- L328) Volume V. Stichus. Trinummus. Truculentus. Vidularia, or the Tale of a Traveling-Bag. Fragments

===== Terence =====
- L022N) Volume I. The Woman of Andros. The Self-Tormentor. The Eunuch
- L023N) Volume II. Phormio. The Mother-in-Law. The Brothers

===== Seneca the Younger =====
- L062N) Volume VIII, Tragedies I. Hercules Furens. Troades. Medea. Hippolytus. Oedipus.
- L078N) Volume IX, Tragedies II. Agamemnon. Thyestes. Hercules Oetaeus. Phoenissae. Octavia.

==== Philosophy ====
===== Boethius =====
- L074) Theological Tractates. The Consolation of Philosophy

===== Cicero =====
- L213) Volume XVI. On the Republic (De re publica). On the Laws (De Legibus)
- L040) Volume XVII. On Ends (De Finibus)
- L141) Volume XVIII. Tusculan Disputations
- L268) Volume XIX. On the Nature of the Gods (De Natura Deorum). Academics (Academica)
- L154) Volume XX. On Old Age (De Senectute). On Friendship (De Amicitia). On Divination (De Divinatione)
- L030) Volume XXI. On Duties (De Officiis): De Officiis

===== Seneca the Younger =====
- L214) Volume I. Moral Essays: De Providentia. De Constantia. De Ira. De Clementia
- L254) Volume II. Moral Essays: De Consolatione ad Marciam. De Vita Beata. De Otio. De Tranquillitate Animi. De Brevitate Vitae. De Consolatione ad Polybium. De Consolatione ad Helviam
- L310) Volume III. Moral Essays: De Beneficiis
- L450) Volume VII. Natural Questions, Books 1–3
- L457) Volume X. Natural Questions, Book 4–7

==== History ====
===== Ammianus Marcellinus =====
- L300) Roman History: Volume I. Books 14–19
- L315) Roman History: Volume II. Books 20–26
- L331) Roman History: Volume III. Books 27–31. Excerpta Valesiana

===== Bede =====
- L246) Historical Works: Volume I. Ecclesiastical History, Books 1–3
- L248) Historical Works: Volume II. Ecclesiastical History, Books 4–5. Lives of the Abbots. Letter to Egbert

===== Julius Caesar =====
- L072) Volume I. Gallic War
- L039) Volume II. Civil Wars
- L402) Volume III. Alexandrian, African, and Spanish Wars

===== Curtius =====
- L368) History of Alexander: Volume I. Books 1–5
- L369) History of Alexander: Volume II. Books 6–10

===== Florus =====
- L231) Epitome of Roman History

===== Justin =====
- L557) Epitome of Pompeius Trogus: Volume I. Books 1–20
- L558) Epitome of Pompeius Trogus: Volume II. Books 21-44

===== Livy =====
- L114) History of Rome: Volume I. Books 1–2
- L133) History of Rome: Volume II. Books 3–4
- L172) History of Rome: Volume III. Books 5–7
- L191) History of Rome: Volume IV. Books 8–10
- L233) History of Rome: Volume V. Books 21–22
- L355) History of Rome: Volume VI. Books 23–25
- L367) History of Rome: Volume VII. Books 26–27
- L381) History of Rome: Volume VIII. Books 28–30
- L295N) History of Rome: Volume IX. Books 31, 34
- L301N) History of Rome: Volume X. Books 35–37
- L313N) History of Rome: Volume XI. Books 38–39
- L332) History of Rome: Volume XII. Books 40–42
- L396) History of Rome: Volume XIII. Books 43–45
- L404) History of Rome: Volume XIV. Summaries. Fragments. Julius Obsequens. General Index

===== Sallust =====
- L116N) Volume I. War with Catiline. War with Jugurtha.
- L522N) Volume II. Fragments of the Histories. Letters to Caesar

===== Tacitus =====
- L111) Volume II. Histories 1–3
- L249) Volume III. Histories 4–5. Annals 1–3
- L312) Volume IV. Annals 4–6, 11–12
- L322) Volume V. Annals 13–16

===== Velleius Paterculus =====
- L152N) Compendium of Roman History. Res Gestae Divi Augusti

===== The Augustan History, edited by D. Magie =====
- L139) Scriptores Historiae Augustae: Volume I. Hadrian. Aelius. Antoninus Pius. Marcus Aurelius. L. Verus. Avidius Cassius. Commodus. Pertinax. Didius Julianus. Septimius Severus. Pescennius Niger. Clodius Albinus
- L140) Scriptores Historiae Augustae : Volume II. Caracalla. Geta. Opellius Macrinus. Diadumenianus. Elagabalus. Severus Alexander. The Two Maximini. The Three Gordians. Maximus and Balbinus
- L263) Scriptores Historiae Augustae: Volume III. The Two Valerians. The Two Gallieni. The Thirty Pretenders. The Deified Claudius. The Deified Aurelian. Tacitus. Probus. Firmus, Saturninus, Proculus and Bonosus. Carus, Carinus and Numerian

==== Oratory ====
===== Apuleius =====
- L534) Apologia. Florida. De Deo Socratis

===== Cicero =====
- L240N) Volume VI. Pro Quinctio. Pro Roscio Amerino. Pro Roscio Comoedo. The Three Speeches on the Agrarian Law Against Rullus
- L221) Volume VII. The Verrine Orations I: Against Caecilius. Against Verres, Part 1; Part 2, Books 1–2
- L293) Volume VIII. The Verrine Orations II: Against Verres, Part 2, Books 3–5
- L198) Volume IX. Pro Lege Manilia. Pro Caecina. Pro Cluentio. Pro Rabirio Perduellionis Reo
- L324) Volume X. In Catilinam 1–4. Pro Murena. Pro Sulla. Pro Flacco
- L158) Volume XI. Pro Archia. Post Reditum in Senatu. Post Reditum ad Quirites. De Domo Sua. De Haruspicum Responsis. Pro Cn. Plancio
- L309) Volume XII. Pro Sestio. In Vatinium
- L447) Volume XIII. Pro Caelio. De Provinciis Consularibus. Pro Balbo
- L252) Volume XIV. Pro Milone. In Pisonem. Pro Scauro. Pro Fonteio. Pro Rabirio Postumo. Pro Marcello. Pro Ligario. Pro Rege Deiotaro
- L189) Volume XVa. Philippics 1-6
- L507) Volume XVb. Philippics 7-14
- L556) Volume XXX. Fragmentary Speeches

===== Quintilian =====
- L500) The Lesser Declamations: Volume I
- L501) The Lesser Declamations: Volume II
- L547) The Major Declamations: Volume I
- L548) The Major Declamations: Volume II
- L549) The Major Declamations: Volume III

===== Seneca the Elder =====
- L463) Declamations: Volume I. Controversiae, Books 1–6
- L464) Declamations: Volume II. Controversiae, Books 7–10. Suasoriae. Fragments

==== Biography ====
===== Cornelius Nepos =====
- L467) Collected works

===== Suetonius =====
- L031) The Lives of the Caesars: Volume I. Julius. Augustus. Tiberius. Gaius. Caligula
- L038) The Lives of the Caesars: Volume II. Claudius. Nero. Galba, Otho, and Vitellius. Vespasian. Titus, Domitian. Lives of Illustrious Men: Grammarians and Rhetoricians. Poets (Terence. Virgil. Horace. Tibullus. Persius. Lucan). Lives of Pliny the Elder and Passienus Crispus

===== Tacitus =====
- L035) Volume I. Agricola. Germania. Dialogue on Oratory

==== Latin Novel ====
===== Apuleius =====
- L044) Metamorphoses (The Golden Ass): Books 1–11, (1965 printing)
- L044N) Metamorphoses (The Golden Ass): Volume I. Books 1–6
- L453) Metamorphoses (The Golden Ass): Volume II. Books 7–11

===== Petronius =====
- L015) Satyricon, with Seneca the Younger's Apocolocyntosis

==== Letters ====
===== Cicero =====
- L007N) Volume XXII. Letters to Atticus 1–89
- L008N) Volume XXIII. Letters to Atticus 90–165A
- L097N) Volume XXIV. Letters to Atticus 166–281
- L205N) Volume XXV. Letters to Friends 1–113
- L216N) Volume XXVI. Letters to Friends 114–280
- L230N) Volume XXVII. Letters to Friends 281–435
- L462N) Volume XXVIII. Letters to Quintus and Brutus. Letter Fragments. Letter to Octavian. Invectives. Handbook of Electioneering
- L491) Volume XXIX. Letters to Atticus 282–426

===== Fronto =====
- L112) Correspondence: Volume I
- L113) Correspondence: Volume II

===== Jerome =====
- L262) Select Letters

===== Pliny the Younger =====
- L055) Letters and Panegyricus: Volume I. Books 1–7
- L059) Letters and Panegyricus: Volume II. Books 8–10. Panegyricus

===== Seneca the Younger =====
- L075) Volume IV. Epistles 1–65
- L076) Volume V. Epistles 66–92
- L077) Volume VI. Epistles 93–124

==== Church Fathers ====
===== Augustine =====
- L026) Confessions: Volume I. Books 1–8
- L027) Confessions: Volume II. Books 9–13
- L239) Select Letters
- L411) City of God: Volume I. Books 1–3
- L412) City of God: Volume II. Books 4–7
- L413) City of God: Volume III. Books 8–11
- L414) City of God: Volume IV. Books 12–15
- L415) City of God: Volume V. Books 16–18.35
- L416) City of God: Volume VI. Books 18.36–20
- L417) City of God: Volume VII. Books 21–22
- L560) The Teacher. Teaching Christianity

===== Prudentius =====
- L387) Volume I. Preface. Daily Round. Divinity of Christ. Origin of Sin. Fight for Mansoul. Against Symmachus 1
- L398) Volume II. Against Symmachus 2. Crowns of Martyrdom. Scenes From History. Epilogue

===== Tertullian and Marcus Minucius Felix =====
- L250) Apology and De Spectaculis. Octavius

==== Other Latin Prose ====
===== Cato and Varro =====
- L283) On Agriculture ISBN 0-674-99313-6
- L551) Cato: Testimonia. Origines
- L552) Cato: Orations. Other Fragments

===== Celsus =====
- L292) On Medicine: Volume I. Books 1–4
- L304) On Medicine: Volume II. Books 5–6
- L336) On Medicine: Volume III. Books 7–8

===== Cicero =====
- L403) Volume I. Rhetorica ad Herennium
- L386) Volume II. On Invention (De Inventione). The Best Kind of Orator (De Optimo Genere Oratorum). Topics (Topica)
- L348) Volume III. On the Orator (De Oratore) Books 1–2
- L349) Volume IV. On the Orator (De Oratore) Book 3. On Fate (De Fato). Stoic Paradoxes (Paradoxa Stoicorum). On the Divisions of Oratory (De Partitione Oratoria)
- L342) Volume V. Brutus. Orator

===== Columella =====
- L361) On Agriculture: Volume I. Books 1–4
- L407) On Agriculture: Volume II. Books 5–9
- L408) On Agriculture: Volume III. Books 10–12. On Trees

===== Frontinus =====
- L174) Stratagems. De aquaeductu

===== Gellius =====
- L195) Attic Nights: Volume I. Books 1–5
- L200) Attic Nights: Volume II. Books 6–13
- L212) Attic Nights: Volume III. Books 14–20

===== Macrobius =====
- L510) Saturnalia: Volume I. Books 1-2
- L511) Saturnalia: Volume II. Books 3-5
- L512) Saturnalia: Volume III. Books 6-7

===== Pliny =====
- L330) Natural History: Volume I. Books 1–2
- L352) Natural History: Volume II. Books 3–7
- L353) Natural History: Volume III. Books 8–11
- L370) Natural History: Volume IV. Books 12–16
- L371) Natural History: Volume V. Books 17–19
- L392) Natural History: Volume VI. Books 20–23
- L393) Natural History: Volume VII. Books 24–27. Index of Plants
- L418) Natural History: Volume VIII. Books 28–32. Index of Fishes
- L394) Natural History: Volume IX. Books 33–35
- L419) Natural History: Volume X. Books 36–37

===== Quintilian =====
- L124N) The Orator's Education: Volume I. Books 1–2
- L125N) The Orator's Education: Volume II. Books 3–5
- L126N) The Orator's Education: Volume III. Books 6–8
- L127N) The Orator's Education: Volume IV. Books 9–10
- L494N) The Orator's Education: Volume V. Books 11–12

===== Valerius Maximus =====
- L492) Memorable Doings and Sayings : Volume I. Books 1–5
- L493) Memorable Doings and Sayings: Volume II. Books 6–9

===== Varro =====
- L333) On the Latin Language: Volume I. Books 5–7
- L334) On the Latin Language: Volume II. Books 8–10. Fragments

===== Vitruvius =====
- L251) On Architecture: Volume I. Books 1–5. ISBN 978-0-674-99277-1.
- L280) On Architecture: Volume II. Books 6–10. ISBN 978-0-674-99309-9.

==== Fragmentary Collections ====
===== Old Latin, edited by Warmington, E.H. =====
- L294) Remains of Old Latin: Volume I. Ennius. Caecilius
- L314) Remains of Old Latin: Volume II. Livius Andronicus. Naevius. Pacuvius. Accius
- L329) Remains of Old Latin: Volume III. Lucilius. The Law of the Twelve Tables
- L359) Remains of Old Latin: Volume IV. Archaic Inscriptions

===== Fragmentary Republican Latin =====
- L294N) Volume I. Ennius: Testimonia. Epic Fragments.
- L537) Volume II. Ennius: Dramatic Fragments. Minor Works.
- L540) Volume III. Oratory, Part 1. Beginning with Appius Claudius Caecus (340–273 BCE).
- L541) Volume IV. Oratory, Part 2.
- L542) Volume V. Oratory, Part 3.
- L314N) Volume VI. Livius Andronicus. Naevius. Caecilius.
- L559) Volume VII. Pacuvius. Minor Tragic Poets. Unidentified Dramatists.
- L564) Volume VIII. Accius. Turpilius. Minor Comic Poets.

== Sources and external links ==
- The Loeb Classical Library (official page): complete catalogue, information about the series' history and new publications
- The Digital Loeb Classical Library
- The Loeb Classical Library on Wikisource
- The ancient texts section of the LacusCurtius website and Greco-Roman collection of the Perseus Project include several of the earliest editions, which have now passed out of copyright. In some cases these editions differ only slightly from those currently published by the LCL; in other cases a great deal has been revised.
- Loebolus: Loeb Classical Library books in the public domain available online
- List of scans of Loebs in the "Links Galore" spreadsheet
- One Hundred Years of the Loeb Classical Library by G.H.R. Horsley
- Complete series (545 volumes) on Archive.org
