= Fabula palliata =

Theatrical genre

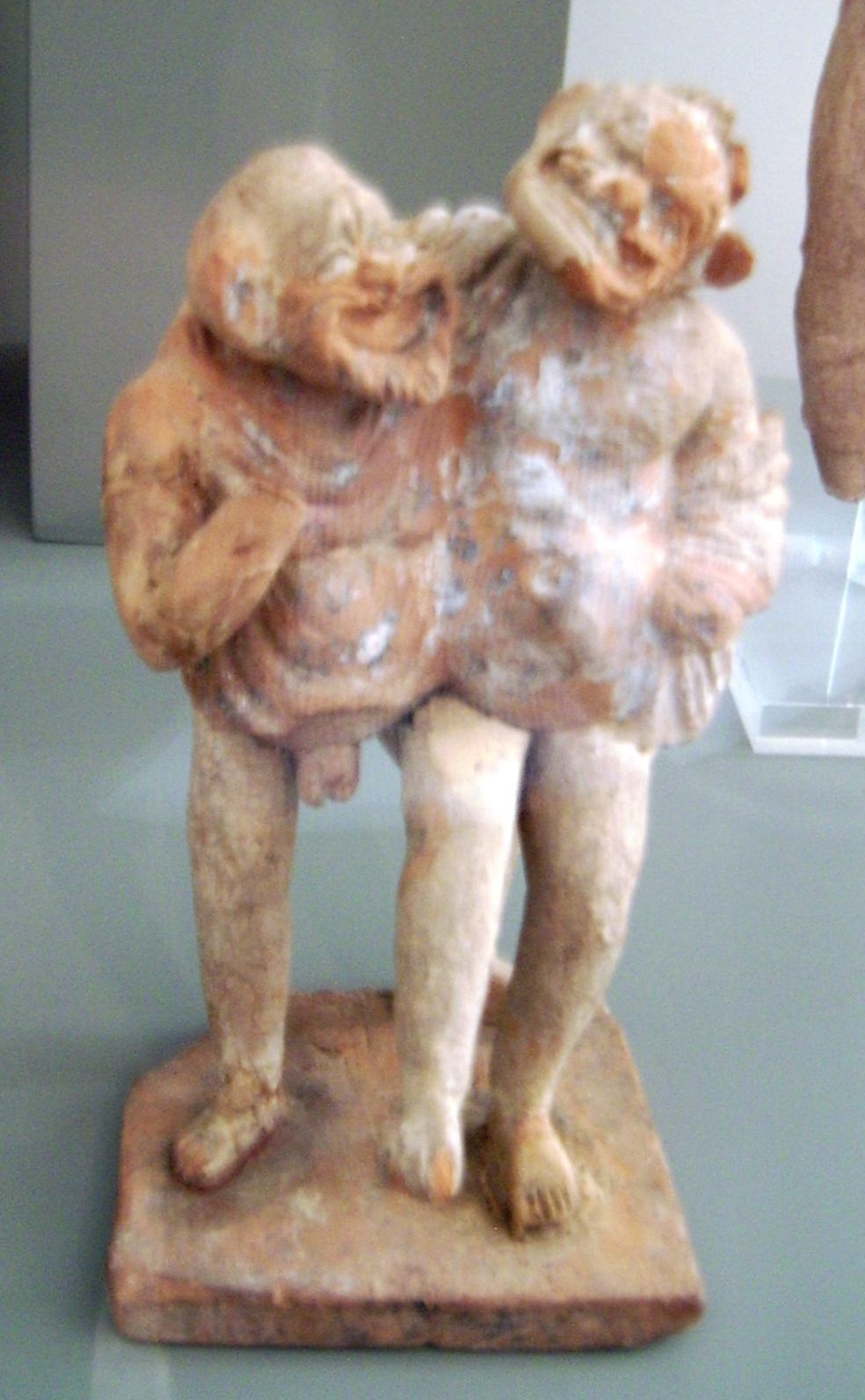
Terracotta representation of two comic actors wearing masks with pallia slung over their shoulders

Fabula palliata is a genre of Roman drama that consists largely of Romanized versions of Greek plays. The name palliata comes from pallium, the Latin word for a Greek-style cloak (himation). It is possible that the term fabula palliata indicates that the actors who performed wore such cloaks. Another possibility is that the fabula itself is metaphorically "cloaked" in a Greek style. As in all Roman drama, the actors wore masks that easily identified which of the stock characters they represented.

== Style ==
The only complete, extant fabulae palliatae are the comedies of Terence and Plautus. Plautus introduced Roman manners and customs to the plays and filled the plays with boisterous humour and musical performances, while Terence kept his plays close to their Greek originals and sometimes combined two plays into one (contaminatio). Consequently, a common misconception is that the genre is inherently comedic. In fact, any Roman play that is based on Greek drama qualifies as a fabula palliata. The extant fabulae palliatae adhere to the style of Greek New Comedy, but references to and fragments of the works of Livius Andronicus, Gnaeus Naevius, and Ennius indicate that all three wrote tragic fabulae palliatae.

Fabulae palliatae are usually set in Greece, feature mostly Greek characters, and seemingly base their plots on Greek originals. The plays usually featured musical performances and boisterous humour. They were often more tame versions of their Greek counterpart that featured family problems, political criticisms and Roman sensibilities. The stories were usually disjointed, illogical and were out of chronological order. This was opposite to their Greek counterparts which were more condensed and straightforward. Roman plays' main deviations from the Greek source material are the absence of a chorus and a willingness to have more than three characters on stage simultaneously.

== Definition and history of the concept ==
Knowledge of the genre comes from a 1st-century BC literary critic named Volcacius Sedigitus, of whom nothing is known except his report in Aulus Gellius. Livius Andronicus was one of the first playwrights to bring the idea of fabula palliata to ancient Rome. Of the writers whose works have survived at all Sedigitus identifies as well Naevius, Plautus, Ennius, Caecilius and Terence as contributors to the genre. In addition were Licinius, Atilius, Turpilius, Trabea and Luscius Lanuvinus. Out of all of fabula palliata only twenty-one plays still survive.
