= Marcus Atilius (poet) =

Ancient Roman poet

Marcus Atilius, of the Atilia gens, was one of the early Roman poets, a comic playwright who lived around the 2nd century BCE.

He is classed among the comic poets of Rome by Roman literary critic Volcacius Sedigitus, who assigns him the fifth place among them in order of merit, after Caecilius, Plautus, Naevius, and Licinius Imbrex. But as Atilius translated into Latin the Electra of Sophocles, it would appear that he wrote tragedies as well as comedies. The latter, however, may have been both superior to, and more numerous than, the former; and this would be a sufficient reason why Sedigitus classed him specifically among the comic poets. Some scholars, such as Jonathan August Weichert, have suggested that Atilius turned Electra into a comedy and that he wrote no tragedies at all, but others disagree with this conjecture and assume Atilius must have written both kinds of plays.

Among his other plays the titles of the following are preserved:

- The Woman Hater (Μισόγονος, Misógonos)
- Bocolia
- Ἄγροικος
- Commorientes

According to another reading the last three are attributed to a different poet, Aquillius.

With the exception of a line quoted by Cicero, and a few words preserved in two passages of Varro, nothing of Atilius has survived. Cicero calls him poeta durissimus, and Licinius describes him as ferreus scriptor.
