= Luscius Lanuvinus =

Roman playwright

- Born: Lanuvium
- Occupation: Playwright
- Writing career
- Period: 2nd century BC
- Genre: Fabula palliata

Luscius Lanuvinus was a 2nd-century BCE ancient Roman playwright from Lanuvium and an author of fabulae palliatae. He was a fierce critic of his contemporary, Terence, who—in his prologues—often responded to Luscius's excoriations. Based on Terence's accounts, it appears that Luscius preferred to remain faithful to the Greek originals. In the prologue to Eunuchus, Terence preserves the names of two of Luscius's plays: Phasma ("Apparition") and Thesaurus ("Treasure"). According to Terence, Luscius had ruined these plays by "translating well but at the same time writing poorly," in the process, making "bad Latin plays out of good Greek ones," which the commentator John Barsby interprets as a critique of overly literal translation. Terence further claims that, in Luscius's edition of the Thesaurus, he mistakenly places the defendant as positing their claim to the treasure before the plaintiff could explain his case and how the treasure supposedly came from his father's tomb, even though—in legal courts—the plaintiff typically speaks first. Given that Terence states that Luscius had "recently" ruined the play Phasma, and that Terence's Eunuchus was performed in 161 BCE, Luscius's play must have been performed around 163 or 162 BCE. Volcacius Sedigitus, an ancient Roman literary critic, provided a list of the—in his opinion—ten greatest comic authors, wherein he places Luscius ninth.

== Known plays ==
- Phasma
- Thesaurus
