= Knut Kleve =

Norwegian classical philologist (1926–2017)

- Born: 24 February 1926; Oslo, Norway
- Died: 11 February 2017 (aged 90)
- Education: University of Oslo
- Occupation: Classical philologist
- Employer(s): University of Bergen; University of Oslo

Knut Kleve (24 February 1926 – 11 February 2017) was a Norwegian classical philologist and a professor at the University of Bergen and at the University of Oslo. He was particularly known for his efforts on restoration of papyrus fragments from the ancient Roman town Herculaneum.

== Early life ==
Kleve was born in Oslo on 24 February 1926, the son of wholesaler Alfred Lauritz Kleve and Miriam Blom Bakke. He was a resistance member during the German occupation of Norway, and was arrested in May 1942 and incarcerated at Møllergata 19 and at the Grini concentration camp until June 1944.

== Career ==
While incarcerated at Grini, Kleve met co-prisoner and professor of classical philology Eiliv Skard, who gave him lessons in the Latin language. He finished his secondary education in 1945, with examen artium at Kristelig Gymnasium in Oslo. After studies at the University of Oslo he graduated as cand.mag. in 1955. He started lecturing in classical philology at the University of Oslo from 1957. Subject for his doctorate studies was the understanding of gods in the school of philosophy called Epicureanism, including the philosophical work De natura deorum by the Roman orator Cicero. His dr.philos. thesis from 1963 was called Gnosis theon. Die Lehre von der natürlichen Gotteserkenntnis in der epikureischen Theologie. He was a professor at the University of Bergen from 1963. He became interested in the Epicurean library from Herculaneum which had been excavated in the mid 18th century. He joined efforts to verify the writing on papyrus fragments. In 1974 Kleve was appointed professor at the University of Oslo. Along with Brynjulf Fosse he developed a new method for restoration of carbonized papyrus fragments. From 1983 he supervised restoration work in Naples. These efforts have resulted in restoration of works by Lucretius and Ennius, and relicts of works by ancient comedy writer Caecilius Statius.

He was a member of the Norwegian Academy of Science and Letters.

== Personal life ==
Kleve was married to Ragnhild Abusdal from 1951 to 1952, to Esther Thylander from 1957 to 1972, to psychologist Kari Aud Ljøstad from 1972, and to professor Liv Jorunn Storstein from 1974 to 1992.

Kleve died on 11 February 2017, aged 91.
