= Philemon (poet) =

4th-century BC Athenian poet of New Comedy

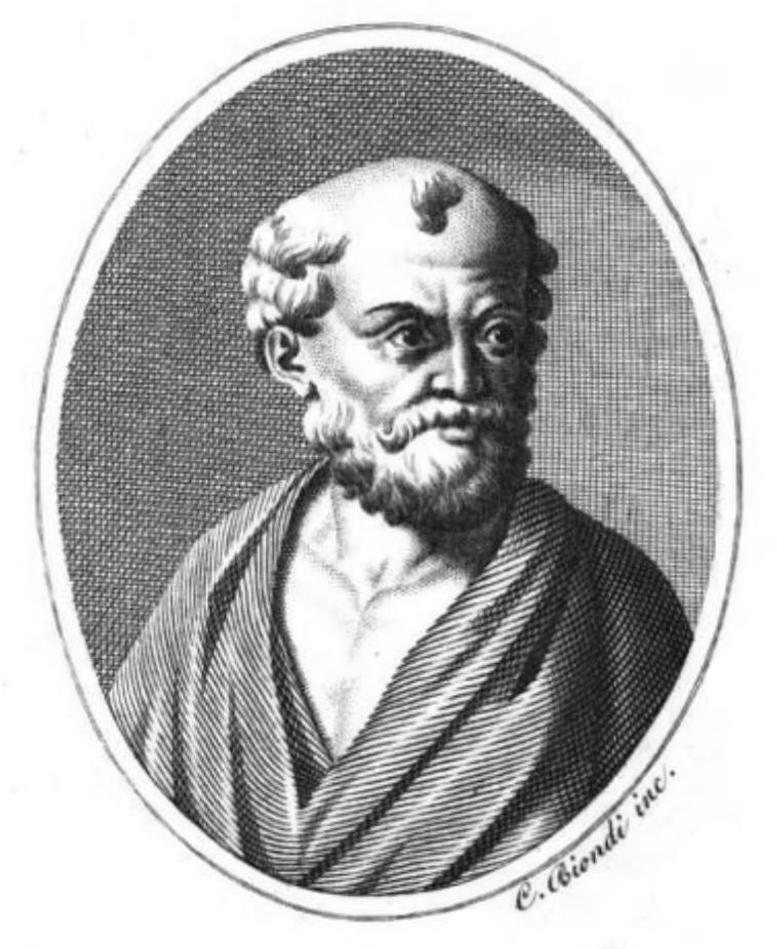
Portrait of Philemon made in 1818

Philemon (Ancient Greek: Φιλήμων; c. 362 BC – c. 262 BC) was an Athenian poet and playwright of the New Comedy. He was born either at Soli in Cilicia or at Syracuse in Sicily but moved to Athens some time before 330 BC, when he is known to have been producing plays.

Except for a short sojourn in Egypt with Ptolemy II Philadelphus, he passed his life at Athens. He later died, nearly a hundred years old, but with mental vigour unimpaired, about the year 262 BC, according to the story, at the moment of his being crowned on the stage.

He attained remarkable popularity, for he repeatedly won victories over his younger contemporary and rival Menander, whose delicate wit was apparently less to the taste of the Athenians of the time than Philemon's comedy. A statue of him was built centuries later, in the 2nd century AD. However, later generations preferred the refined style of Menander, and only stray fragments survive today. No manuscripts of his work have been located.

== Surviving titles and fragments ==
Of his ninety-seven works, fifty-seven are known by titles and fragments. Three of his plays were the basis for three Latin adaptations of Plautus (Mercator being adapted from Emporos, Trinummus from Thesauros, and Mostellaria from Phasma).

- Adelphoi ("Brothers")
- Agroikos ("The Country-Dweller")
- Agyrtes ("The Beggar-Priest")
- Aitolos ("Aetolus")
- Anakalypton ("The Man Who Reveals, or Unveils")
- Ananeoumene ("The Renewed Woman")
- Androphonos ("The Man-Slayer")
- Apokarteron ("The Starving Man")
- Apolis ("One Exiled From the City")
- Arpazomenos ("The Captured, or Seized, Man")
- Auletes ("The Flute-Player")
- Babylonios ("The Babylonian Man")
- Chera ("The Widow")
- Ekoikizomenos
- Emporos ("The Merchant")
- Encheiridion ("Handbook")
- Epidikazomenos ("The Claimant")
- Euripos ("Euripus")
- Ephebos ("The Adolescent")
- Ephedritai
- Gamos ("Marriage")
- Heroes ("The Heroes")
- Hypobolimaios ("The Changeling")
- Iatros ("The Physician")
- Katapseudomenos ("The False Accuser")
- Koinonoi ("Companions")
- Kolax ("The Flatterer")
- Korinthia ("The Woman From Corinth")
- Lithoglyphos ("The Stone-Carver," or "Engraver")
- Metion, or Zomion
- Moichos ("The Adulterer")
- Myrmidones ("The Myrmidons")
- Mystis ("Woman Initiated Into The Mysteries")
- Neaira ("Neaira")
- Nemomenoi ("Those Who Share")
- Nothos ("The Bastard")
- Nyx ("Night")
- Paides ("Children")
- Palamedes ("Palamedes")
- Panegyris ("The Assembly")
- Pankratiastes
- Pareision ("The Gate-Crasher")
- Phasma ("The Phantom, or Spectre")
- Philosophoi ("Philosophers")
- Pittokopumenos ("Pitch-Plastered")
- Pterygion
- Ptoche ("The Poor Woman"), or Rhodia ("The Woman From Rhodes")
- Pyrphoros ("The Fire-Bearer")
- Pyrrhos ("Pyrrhus")
- Sardios ("The Man From Sardis", or possibly "Carnelian")
- Sikelikos ("The Sicilian Man," possibly belongs to Diphilus)
- Stratiotes ("The Soldier")
- Synapothneskontes ("Men Dying Together")
- Synephebos ("Fellow Adolescent")
- Thebaioi ("Men From Thebes")
- Thesauros ("The Treasure")
- Thyroros ("The Door-Keeper")
