= Trinummus =

Ancient Roman play by Plautus

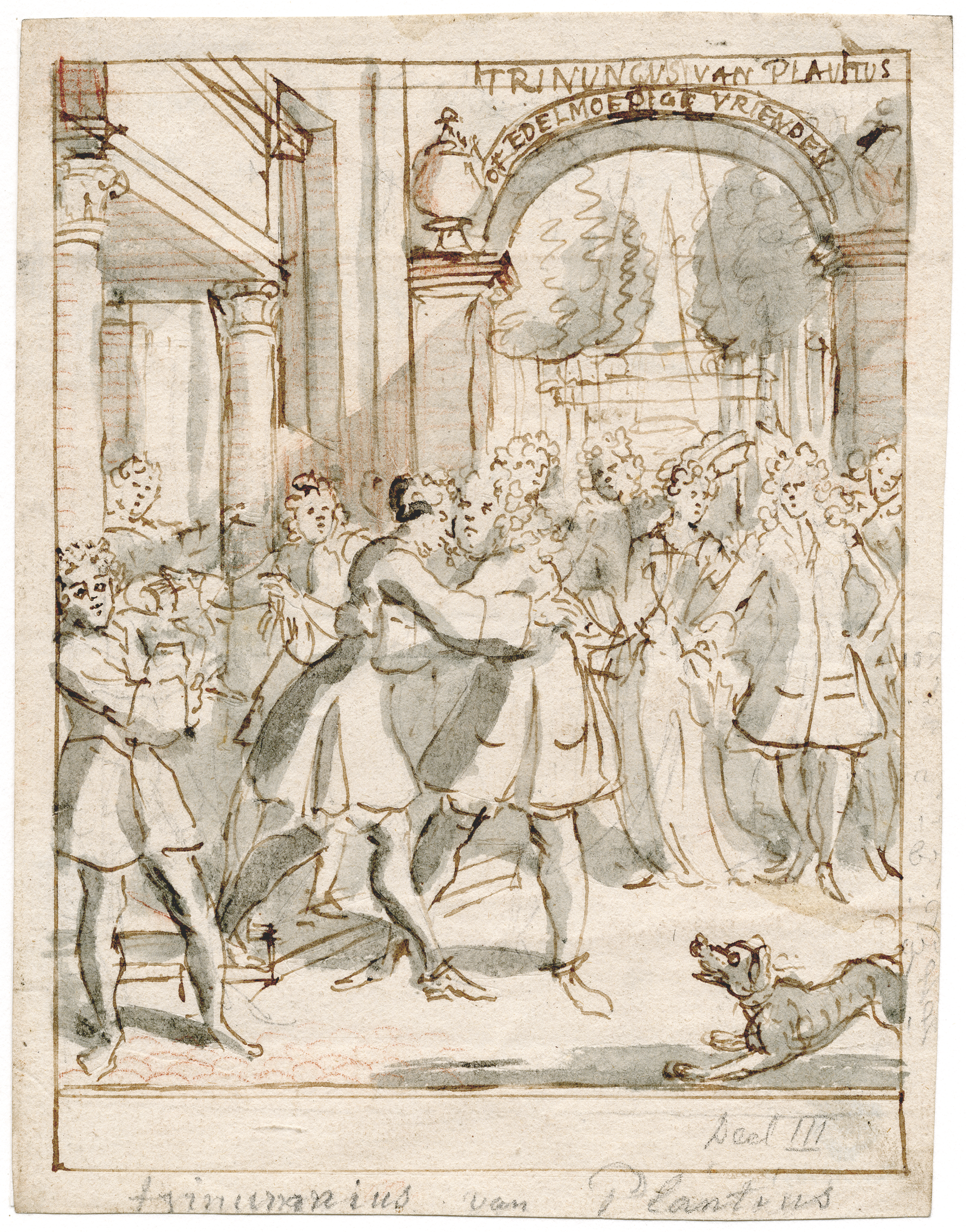
- Design for a frontispiece by Hendrik van Halmael
- Original language: Latin
- Written by: Plautus
- Genre: Roman comedy
- Setting: Ancient Athens

Premiere
- Date: late 3rd century BC
- Place: Rome?

Trinummus is a comedic Latin play by the early Roman playwright Titus Maccius Plautus. It is called Trinummus ("The Three Coins") because in the play an imposter (sȳcophanta) is paid three coins to dress up as a messenger from Syria. According to the prologue, the play is adapted from one called Thesaurus ("The Treasure") by the Greek playwright Philemon.

== Plot ==
The play opens with a Prologue delivered by the goddess Extravagant Living (Luxuria) and her daughter Poverty (Inopia). They explain that the house behind them is occupied by a young man who has used up all his father's money and has become poor.

An Athenian gentleman, Callicles, is reproached by his friend Megaronides for having purchased the house of his neighbour Charmides, who is away in Syria, at a cheap price from Charmides' spendthrift son Lesbonicus. Callicles explains that he has not done anything dishonourable, but that he wanted to protect the house and the treasure which Charmides told him is buried in it for his friend, to avoid Charmides' wealth being frittered away by his son's extravagance.

Meanwhile the young man Lysiteles, who lives next door, tells his father Philto that he wishes to marry Charmides' daughter, without receiving a dowry, since he is anxious to help Lesbonicus. Philto goes to Lesbonicus to ask for the sister's hand in marriage for Lysiteles. He says that he will agree to the marriage even though Lesbonicus has no money for a dowry. Lesbonicus, however, refuses, as it would dishonour his sister. He offers some land as a marriage portion, but Charmides's slave Stasimus, trying to prevent any more of his master's property being lost, puts Philto off by telling him that the land is poisoned.

When Stasimus tells Callicles about the proposal, Callicles goes to consult his friend Megaronides, who suggests that Callicles should use Charmides' buried treasure as a dowry. Callicles likes the idea, but fearing that Lesbonicus will claim the treasure for himself if he hears about it, he devises a plan to dress up an imposter in Syrian costume for three coins (Latin trinummus) and make him pretend that he has been sent bringing dowry money from Charmides.

At this point Charmides suddenly arrives back and has an amusing conversation with the imposter. At first Charmides reproaches Callicles for buying up the house, but when Callicles explains everything Charmides is delighted. Lysiteles is allowed to marry Charmides' daughter, and Lesbonicus is betrothed to Callicles' daughter.

== Metrical structure ==
Plautus's plays were divided up probably in Renaissance times into five acts. However, it is not thought that these divisions go back to Plautus's time, since no manuscript contains them before the 15th century. Also, the acts themselves do not always match the structure of the plays, which is more clearly shown by the variation in metres.

In Plautus's plays a common pattern is to begin each section with iambic senarii (which were spoken without music), then one or more passages of music in various metres, and finally a passage in trochaic septenarii, which were apparently sung or recited to the accompaniment of tibiae (a pair of reed pipes). Moore calls this the "ABC succession", where A = iambic senarii, B = other metres, C = trochaic septenarii.

Compared with some other plays, the Trinummus has a relatively simple metrical structure, namely:

ABC, AC, ABC, AC, ABC

There is one polymetric song (compared with five in Pseudolus) and two short passages in anapaests. Otherwise the whole play consists of iambic senarii and trochaic septenarii.

=== Lysiteles wishes to marry ===
- Prologue; Act 1 (1–222): iambic senarii (222 lines)

Prologue: The goddess Luxuria speaks about Lesbonicus's fall into poverty.
Megaronides soliloquises, then reproaches his friend Callicles for buying Charmides' house. Callicles defends himself.

- Act 2.1–2.2 (223–300): polymetric song (bacchiac, anapaestic, and others) (74 lines)

In a soliloquy, Lysiteles sings of the trouble and expense of being in love with a mistress; he determines that it is better to live a serious life. – His father Philto comes out and advises him to avoid the company of bad men.

- Act 2.2 (cont.) (301–391): trochaic septenarii (91 lines)

Lysiteles promises to behave well, and expresses a wish to get married. He defends the character of Lesbonicus and says that to help him he is willing to marry Lesbonicus's sister without a dowry.

=== The dowry proves a problem ===
- Act 2.3–2.4 (392–601): iambic senarii (210 lines)

Philto soliloquises that he is not happy about it but it is best to humour one's children. He overhears a conversation between Lesbonicus and the slave Stasimus, who is telling him that all the money Lesbonicus received for the house is already gone. Philto now tells Lesbonicus about the marriage offer. However, Lesbonicus refuses to let his sister marry without a dowry and offers some land; but Stasimus (wishing to save the family property) takes Philto aside and advises him that the land is poisoned.

- Act 3.1–3.2 (602–728): trochaic septenarii (127 lines)

Stasimus informs Callicles about the proposal. Callicles goes next door to consult Megaronides.

– Shortly afterwards Lysiteles and Lesbonicus arrive, arguing. Lesbonicus refuses to let his sister go without a dowry. Lysiteles tells Lesbonicus he will fall into poverty if he gives his land as a dowry. Lesbonicus invites his friend inside. When they have gone in, Stasimus speaks of his fears for his own future.

=== The trick of the hired imposter ===
- Act 3.3 (729–819): iambic senarii (90 lines)

Megaronides suggests to Callicles that he uses Charmides' buried treasure for the dowry; but Callicles is reluctant to tell Lesbonicus about the treasure in case he misuses it. Megaronides therefore suggests the ruse of dressing up an imposter to pretend that he is bringing the money from Charmides in Syria. He warns Callicles to keep the matter secret from his servants and wife. Callicles goes indoors while Megaronides goes to the forum to look for a suitable trickster.

- Act 4.1 (820–842a): anapaestic song (mostly an8) (23 lines)

Charmides arrives, singing a prayer of thanks to Neptune god of the sea for bringing him safe home.

- Act 4.2 (843–997): trochaic septenarii (155 lines)

The hired imposter appears, wearing a broad-brimmed hat of the kind worn by travellers, and Charmides has a comic dialogue with him. The hapless imposter can't even remember the name of the person who is supposed to have sent him, and gives an absurd account of his supposed journey from Syria.

=== Charmides learns what has happened ===
- Act 4.2 (cont.) (998–1007): iambic senarii (10 lines)

When the imposter has gone, Charmides soliloquises about his apprehensions.

- Act 4.3 (1008–1092): trochaic septenarii (85 lines)

Stasimus arrives. Charmides overhears him complaining of having been robbed of his ring in a bar and of the morality of present day people. Charmides calls to him. Stasimus tells Charmides that his son has sold the house to Callicles and is now living in an annex at the back.

=== The marriage is arranged ===
- Act 4.4 (1093–1114): iambic senarii (22 lines)

Charmides reproaches Callicles, but Callicles defends himself to Charmides' satisfaction. Charmides sends Stasimus to the port to bring his luggage, and goes inside with Callicles.

- Act 5.1 (1115–1119): anapaestic quaternarii (5 lines)

Lysiteles arrives, singing of his happiness.

- Act 5.1 (cont.)–5.2 (1120–1189): trochaic septenarii (70 lines)

Lysiteles says he has heard from Stasimus that Charmides has returned. Charmides and Callicles come outside. Charmides praises Callicles for his loyalty. Callicles tells him about Lysiteles' marriage offer and explains the trick of the imposter. Lysiteles now comes forward. Charmides approves of the match and insists on giving a dowry of 1000 gold coins. Lysiteles calls Lesbonicus outside to hear the good news of his father's return, and Charmides tells his son that it has been arranged that he may marry Callicles' daughter.

== Translations ==
- English translation by Henry Thomas Riley at Perseus: Trinummus
- Wolfang de Melo, 2013

== See also ==
- Philemon the poet
