= Mostellaria =

Ancient Roman play by Plautus

- Original language: Latin
- Written by: Plautus
- Based on: Phasma by Philemon
- Genre: Roman comedy
- Setting: Athens

Premiere
- Date: Late 3rd century BC
- Place: Rome

Mostellaria is a play by the Roman author Plautus. Its name translates from Latin as "The Ghost (play)" (with the word fabula understood in the title). The play is believed to be an adaptation of a lost comedy of the Athenian poet Philemon called Phasma (the Ghost). It is set in a street in the city of Athens.

== Characters ==
=== Main characters ===
- Theopropides – an Athenian merchant
- Philolaches – Theopropides' son
- Tranio – Slave owned by Theopropides
- Philematium – A courtesan who has been set free by Philolaches
- Callidamates – Friend of Philolaches
- Simo – Theopropides' neighbour
- Misargyrides – A moneylender

=== Minor characters ===
- Grumio – Country slave, owned by Theopropides
- Sphaerio – Slave owned by Theopropides
- Scapha – Philematium's attendant
- Delphium – Callidamates' girlfriend
- Phaniscus – Callidamates' slave
- Pinacium – Callidamates' slave

== Plot ==
A young man named Philolaches engages in carousing and reckless indulgence while his father Theopropides is overseas on business. Philolaches has borrowed a large sum of money to buy the freedom of the slave-girl he loves. During a street party with his companions, his slave Tranio interrupts the merry-making to announce that Philolaches' father has returned unexpectedly and will arrive from the harbour at any minute. Amid the general panic, Tranio contrives to lock Philolaches and the others in the house. When the father arrives, Tranio greets him respectfully but pretends that it is dangerous to enter the house because it is haunted by the ghost of a man once killed there.

At this moment, a money-lender appears to claim the sum that Philolaches borrowed. Tranio pretends that the money was borrowed to buy the house next door. Even after Philolaches' father meets the real owner of the house, Tranio manages to hide the truth for some time, but he is finally found out and jumps on top of an altar to escape punishment. The conflict is resolved when one of Philolaches' companions offers to repay the debt, allowing the father to forgive his son and Tranio.

The play is set in a street in Athens. The houses of Theopropides and his neighbour Simo face the audience. Between them is a narrow alley leading to the garden door of Simo's house. There is an altar between the stage and the audience. To the audience's left the road leads to the harbour, and on the right to the forum.

== Division into acts ==
Plautus's plays are traditionally divided into five acts; these are referred to here for convenience, since many editions make use of them. However, it is not thought that they go back to Plautus's time, since no manuscript contains them before the 15th century. Also, the acts themselves do not always match the structure of the plays, which is more clearly shown by the variation in metres.

== Metrical structure ==
The different scenes of the play are clearly differentiated by changes of metre. The usual pattern is to begin each section with iambic senarii (which were spoken without music), then a scene of music in various metres. Each section is rounded off by lively trochaic septenarii, which were apparently recited or sung to the accompaniment of tībiae (a pair of reed pipes). Moore calls this the "ABC" metrical succession. In this play, the pattern is varied from ABC, ABC... as follows:

ABBC, BC, AB(C), ABC, BC, AC

C. W. Marshall (2006), however, who sees the metrical sections (or "arcs") as always starting with iambic senarii, divides the play into just four sections as follows:

ABBCBC, AB(C), ABCBC, AC

The play contains five songs: three of them polymetric, using a range of different metres, involving young men and slaves; and one each of cretic and bacchiac, involving the old men Simo and Theopropides. There is also a section of 90 lines of iambic septenarii (a metre often associated with prostitutes) when the prostitute Philematium is chatting with her maid Scapha.

=== The scene is set ===
- Act 1.1 (lines 1–83): iambic senarii (80 lines)

The country slave Grumio chides city-slave Tranio for wasting their master's money

- Act 1.2 (84–156): polymetric song (bacchiac, iambic, cretic, ending with 3 lines of trochaic septenarii) (70 lines)

The young man Philolaches ruefully contemplates his wasteful way of life.

- Act 1.3 (154–247): iambic septenarii (90 lines)

Philolaches overhears his girlfriend Philematium and her slave Scapha talking about him.

- Act 1.3 (248–312): trochaic septenarii (61 lines)

Philolaches sends Scapha away and talks to Philematium.

=== Disaster strikes ===
- Act 1.4 (313–347): polymetric song (bacchiac, cretic, anapaestic, reizianum) (35 lines)

Philolaches's friend Callidamates arrives, very drunk, with his girlfriend Delphium.

- Act 2.1 (348–408): trochaic septenarii (60 lines)

The slave Tranio brings news that Philocrates' father has returned from his trip. He ushers the young men into the house

=== Tranio tricks Theopropides ===
- Act 2.1–3.1 (409–689): iambic senarii (277 lines)

Tranio addresses the audience. He locks the house door. – Philolaches' father Theopropides arrives. Tranio persuades him that the house is haunted. – Next he fends off the money-lender, persuading Theopropides that the money was borrowed as a downpayment on a new house.

- Act 3.2 (690–743): mostly cretic (54 lines)

The neighbour Simo comes out complaining about his wife. Tranio flatters Simo. He tells him about his difficult situation.

- Act 3.2 (744–747): tr7, ia8, ia7 (3 lines)

Tranio begs Simo not to betray him to his master.

=== Tranio tricks Simo ===
- Act 3.2 (747–782): iambic senarii (36 lines)

Tranio tricks Simo into letting Theopropides inspect his house.

- Act 3.3 (783–804): bacchiac (ending with 1 line of tr8) (22 lines)

Tranio leads Theopropides over to Simo's house

- Act 3.3 (805–857): trochaic septenarii (53 lines)

Theopropides converses with Simo and begins his inspection of Simo's house, believing falsely that Simo has agreed to sell it.

=== Theopropides discovers the truth ===
- Act 4.1 (858–903): polymetric song (mixed metres) (46 lines)

Callidamates's two slaves, Phaniscus and Pinacium, arrive to collect their master. They exchange banter.

- Act 4.2 (904–992): trochaic septenarii (89 lines)

When Tranio has gone to fetch Philolaches, Theopropides gets into conversation with the two slaves and discovers the truth.

=== Tranio escapes punishment ===
- Act 4.3 (993–1040): iambic senarii (49 lines)

Theopropides meets Simo and they both realise they have been tricked. They determine to punish Tranio.

- Act 5.1–5.2 (1041–1181): trochaic septenarii (138 lines)

Tranio realises that he has been exposed. He flees to the nearby altar to avoid punishment. Philolaches' friend Callidamates appears and persuades Theopropides to forgive both Philolaches and Tranio.

== Adaptations ==
Mostellaria is one of several Plautus plays used as inspiration for the Stephen Sondheim, Burt Shevelove and Larry Gelbart 1962 musical A Funny Thing Happened on the Way to the Forum. The character Erroneous returns from being abroad to be told his house is haunted and must walk seven times around the seven hills of Rome to remove the ghosts.

Kevin P. Joyce's play When the Cat's Away is loosely based on Mostellaria, transposing the story from Athens to modern day Nantucket.

Rachel Beth Cunning simplified and adapted the play to create more comprehensible reading materials for Latin 3 and Latin 4 students in a high school classroom.
