= Mercator (play) =

Latin comedic play by Plautus

- Written by: Plautus
- Based on: Emporos by Philemon
- Original language: Latin
- Genre: Roman comedy
- Setting: Athens, before the houses of Demipho and Lysimachus

Premiere
- Date premiered: late 3rd century BC
- Place premiered: Rome?

Mercator, "The Merchant," is a Latin comedic play for the early Roman theatre by Titus Maccius Plautus. It is based on the Greek play Emporos (the Merchant) by the Greek comedy playwright Philemon. It is believed to be among Plautus's first plays, possibly written around 206 BC. The central conflict involves a father who falls in love with a slave girl who is, unbeknownst to the father, his son's lover.

== Characters ==
- Charinus—a young merchant
- Acanthio—Charinus's slave
- Demipho—father of Charinus, also a merchant
- Lysimachus—friend of Demipho
- Eutychus—friend of Charinus, son of Lysimachus
- Pasicompsa—lover and slave of Charinus
- Dorippa—wife of Lysimachus
- Syra—slave of Lysimachus's family
- A cook
- Other slaves

== Plot ==
The play takes place in a street in Athens. In the back wall of the stage there are two houses, that of Demipho and his son Charinus, and that of his friend Lysimachus and his son Eutychus. There is a shrine or altar of Apollo near Lysimachus's house.

=== Prologue ===
Charinus explains that he had taken after his father's example and decided to become a merchant. He had much success in Rhodes and there fell in love with a slave woman named Pasicompsa. He purchased Pasicompsa and brought her with him to his home in Athens where he now ponders how to prevent his father from discovering his love.

=== Act I ===
Acanthio runs to Charinus from the harbor to deliver news that Demipho has been to the ship and seen Pasicompsa. To cover for Charinus, Acanthio had convinced Demipho that Charinus had purchased Pasicompsa to serve as a maid for Charinus's mother. He further tells Charinus that Demipho was flirting with Pasicompsa. Charinus decides he must go to the harbor at once.

=== Act II ===
Returning from the harbor, Demipho enters and claims that he has had a dream in which he entrusted a prize goat to his monkey friend, but the monkey lost the goat to a younger goat. He admits to his neighbor Lysimachus that he has fallen in love and feels youthful. Lysimachus leaves and Charinus enters, lamenting his predicament. Demipho then tells Charinus that Pasicompsa is too fine to be a maid and instead insists Pasicompsa be sold. The two begin a bidding war, each claiming to represent imaginary clients. Demipho rejects his son's offers and turns Charinus away from the harbor. When Charinus exits, Demipho reveals his plan to have Lysimachus purchase Pasicompsa on Demipho's behalf. Separately, Charinus sends Eutychus to purchase Pasicompsa himself.

=== Act III ===
Lysimachus buys Pasicompsa and is bringing her to Lysimachus's home. He tells her he bought her on behalf of her own master, and Pasicompsa is pleased, believing Lysimachus to mean Charinus. After they exit into Lysimachus's house, Demipho enters and attempts to justify what he believes he has earned with age. Lysimachus returns to Demipho and tells him he must find Pasicompsa elsewhere to stay before Dorippa returns from the countryside. For the time being, the two exit to find a cook for a feast to be held that night. Shortly after, Eutychus tells Charinus that he was too late and Pasicompsa was sold to an unknown buyer. Heartbroken, Charinus decides he will leave Athens, but Eutychus becomes determined to find Pasicompsa.

=== Act IV ===
Dorippa returns home from the countryside earlier than expected, and she and Syra (whose name is meant to imply her Syrian ethnicity) discover Pasicompsa in the house, believing her to be Lysimachus's mistress. Lysimachus returns home and tries to explain to his wife that he is only looking after Pasicompsa temporarily, but when the cook hired for that night's feast arrives, Dorippa becomes only more sure of her suspicions and exits into her house crying. Lysimachus dismisses the cook and follows after his wife. Eutychus returns home to find Syra outside, who urges him inside to see his father's mistress. Syra laments the inequalities between the unfaithfulness of men and women.

=== Act V ===
Eutychus finds Charinus just as Charinus is about to leave Athens and tells him that he has found Pasicompsa in Eutychus's own home. Charinus exits into the home, and Eutychus remains outside to confront Lysimachus and Demipho. He tells them Pasicompsa was really Charinus's lover and that Demipho should be ashamed for trying to take her for himself. He proposes a law that old men should not interfere in the passionate love of young men, and the three exit into Lysimachus's house.

== Metrical structure ==
The scheme of Mercator is a simple one. If A = iambic senarii, B = other metres, and C = trochaic septenarii, the scheme is as follows: One way of dividing it would be as follows:

ABC, ABC, BAC, AC

Timothy Moore, however, argues that the scene with Pasicompsa (499–543), though only 46 lines, is a metrical unit by itself; he therefore divides the play as follows:

ABC, ABC, B, AC, AC

The Mercator is thought to follow Philemon's original five-act Greek play from which it is adapted fairly closely, although one scholar has suggested that the first act in the Greek play might have ended at 334 rather than 224. Greek plays had a "chorus" or dance interlude between acts to represent the passing of time. Latin plays had no chorus, and the action was continuous. At Pseudolus 573, the tibia-player who was on stage throughout the play played some music to cover the gap; though it is not certain whether this happened regularly.

The "A" passages, in iambic senarii, are believed to have been recited without music. This metre is used for the introduction to the play and also for most of the scenes where the old men are involved. The "B" passages appear to have been songs. In this play various metres are used for the songs: iambic octonarii, mixed with trochaic septenarii and other metres, for the "running slave" scene; mainly bacchiac, but mixed with anapaestic quaternarii and trochaic octonarii, for Charinus's lament; and iambic septenarii, a metre often used in scenes with prostitutes, for the scene with Pasicompsa. The "C" passages in trochaic septenarii may also have been sung; certainly they were accompanied by music. They tend to round off the episodes in the play.

=== Demipho sees his son's girlfriend ===
- Act 1.1 (1–110): iambic senarii (109 lines)

The young man Charinus explains to the audience that this play is an adaptation of one called the Emporos ("Merchant") of Philemon. He describes how in early youth he had annoyed his father by wasting a lot of money on a certain courtesan. Eventually his father had sent him to Rhodes to do business, and for two years he had worked there successfully. But shortly before he left he had been invited to a friend's house, and that night had been entertained by a young slave-girl and had fallen in love with her. He had purchased that girl and brought her back. He had left her on the boat with a servant. Suddenly Charinus is alarmed to see the same slave running towards him.

- Act 1.2 (111–116): mixed (mostly iambic octonarii but with some tr7, ia4, ia6) (30 lines)

The slave Acanthio arrives running and completely out of breath. Charinus watches him and begs him to say what is the matter. Acanthio seems out of sorts and annoyed.

- Act 1.2 (141–224): trochaic septenarii (82 lines)

Eventually, after much hesitation and mutual interruption, Acanthio says he has bad news: Charinus's father had gone on board the ship and seen the girl. Acanthio had told him that Charinus had bought her as a servant for his mother. Charinus is dismayed to hear this; he doesn't want to lie to his father, and doesn't think that his father will believe the tale; but Acanthio assures him that he has already believed it. Charinus hurriedly leaves for the harbour. Acanthio advises him to go by a different route so as not to risk meeting his father.

=== Demipho plots to have the girl for himself ===
- Act 2.1–2.2 (225–334): iambic senarii (108 lines)

Charinus's father Demipho enters. He recounts a strange dream in which he had bought a she-goat and entrusted it to a monkey to look after; but soon the monkey had come to him complaining that the goat had eaten part of his wife's marriage-portion. Later a billy-goat had come and taken away the she-goat from the monkey and made fun of him. Demipho says that he believes the she-goat must be a beautiful girl he had just seen on the boat his son had arrived in from Rhodes. He had fallen madly in love with this girl.
Demipho's friend and neighbour Lysimachus enters, accompanied by a servant carrying hoes. He tells the servant that he will have a certain troublesome goat castrated. Demipho is alarmed in case these words turn out to be an omen. Lysimachus sends the servant off to his farm with a message to his wife that he will not be at the farm today. Demipho addresses him and tells him he is in love. Lysimachus is surprised. He goes off to the harbour. Demipho watches as his son approaches.

- Act 2.3 (335–363): polymetric song (ba, an, tr8) (29 lines)

Charinus enters, singing of his unhappiness. Now that his father has seen the girl, he doesn't think he is going to be able to convince him that she is to be a maid for his mother; he is afraid his father may take her away and sell her overseas.

- Act 2.3–2.4 (364–498): trochaic septenarii (130 lines)

Demipho asks Charinus if he is ill, and suggests he should rest, but Charinus says he has business to complete. Next Demipho asks his son about the servant girl he has brought. He says that because she's pretty, she would be unsuitable as a lady's maid. Demipho pretends to see a friend in the distance who is bidding to buy the girl and will pay a high price. Charinus says he also has a friend who is also keen to buy her and is madly in love with her. Charinus raises legal objections; he also says the girl is partly owned by a third party. But Demipho won't listen, and hurries off to the harbour, telling the audience that he will ask his friend Lysimachus to buy the girl.

Charinus is miserable and wishes to kill himself. Suddenly Lysimachus's son Eutychus, a friend of Charinus, comes out of Lysimachus's house. He offers to go to the harbour and trick Charinus's father by outbidding him for the girl. Charinus gladly accepts.

=== Lysimachus brings Pasicompsa ===
- Act 3.1–3.2 (499–543): (ia7) (46 lines)

Lysimachus returns with the girl, having just purchased her. She tells him her name is Pasicompsa and that she is good at weaving. He says he hasn't purchased her for himself but for another man. For a moment she thinks he means Charinus; but Lysimachus disappoints her by saying that her new owner is old enough to have lost his teeth. He takes her into his house, which is next door to Demipho's.

- Act 3.2–3.3 (544–587): iambic senarii (44 lines)

Demipho arrives, congratulating himself on having bought Pasicompsa without his wife or son knowing. He makes as if to go into his house, but changes his mind and heads for Lysimachus's house. Before he can enter, Lysimachus comes out and advises him that in view of his age it might be best to have something to eat before embracing the girl. Demipho agrees and suggests that they hire a cook to prepare a dinner. Lysimachus reminds him that he must also find a lodging since the girl must be gone before Lysimachus's wife returns the next day.

- Act 3.4 (588–666): trochaic septenarii (73 lines)

Charinus enters, full of anxiety. Soon Eutychus arrives, bringing the bad news that an unknown old man had already purchased Pasicompsa before Eutychus reached the harbour. Charinus despairs and despite his friend's protests says he is going to go into exile.

=== Dorippa discovers the girl ===
- Act 4.1–4.6 (667–829): iambic senarii (161 lines)

Lysimachus's wife Dorippa arrives from the country, accompanied by an aged female slave called Syra. After offering a sprig of bay leaves on the altar of Apollo outside the house, she goes in, only to come out at once saying that there is a prostitute in the house. The two women go inside.

Lysimachus arrives back from the market, saying that Demipho is buying food very extravagantly.

Dorippa comes out again, lamenting that her husband has taken a prostitute into the house. She sees Lysimachus and demands to know who the woman is. He is unable to give her a satisfactory answer.

A hired cook arrives with his assistants who are carrying baskets of food. He embarrasses Lysimachus by asking if Dorippa is the woman Lysimachus is in love with; he also reminds Lysimachus that he had said he detested his wife, who was in the country. Lysimachus frantically tells the cook to go away, and has to pay him a drachma to make him do so. The furious Dorippa asks Lysimachus if what the cook had said is true; he denies it, but she orders Syra to go and fetch her father. Then she goes inside. Lysimachus blames Demipho for the embarrassing situation and goes off to find him.

The servant, Syra, comes back saying that Dorippa's father was unavailable. Eutychus enters from the other side telling the audience that he has failed to find the man who bought Pasicompsa. Syra tells him that his mother has returned from the country and found that his father has brought a prostitute into the house. Eutychus goes inside to investigate. Syra, after complaining that men can get away with extra-marital affairs but women cannot, follows him.

- Act 5.1–5.4 (830–1026): trochaic septenarii (198 lines)

Charinus comes out of his house, dressed for a journey, and says a final farewell to the door. Meanwhile Eutychus comes out of the house next door, saying a prayer of thanks to the goddess Venus. Charinus, still speaking to himself, says that neither sea nor mountain, nor heat or cold will deter him from looking for his beloved. He makes as if to depart but Eutychus now sees him and calls him back. He informs Charinus that Pasicompsa is in Lysimachus's house. Charinus calls a boy out to bring him a cloak, and hands the boy his travelling cape. But when Eutychus says he can't go inside to see Pasicompsa just yet, Charinus despairs and asks for his travelling cape again. He begins to talk like a madman as if he is voyaging from place to place in the Mediterranean. At last Eutychus calms him down and takes him inside the house.

Lysimachus and Demipho arrive. Lysimachus is explaining what a lot of trouble Demipho has got him into. Eutychus comes out. He tells his father that his wife is no longer angry with him. But he reproaches Demipho for his unseemly behaviour and tells him that he ought to allow his son to keep his mistress. Demipho claims that he didn't realise the girl was Charinus's girlfriend and he hopes his son will forgive him. They go inside. By way of an epilogue Eutychus tells the audience that he wishes to propose a new law: old men should refrain from womanising, but they should allow their sons to do so.

== Analysis and Criticism ==
The play makes use of many stock characters, with which theatergoers would have been familiar. Charinus plays the role of the adulescens amator, Demipho is the senex, and Pasicompsa is the meretrix. Other familiar characters are the "running slave" (Acanthio), the old nurse (Syra), the hired cook, the indignant wife (Dorippa), and the helpful friend (sodalis opitulator) (Lysimachus and Eutychus).

The plot is relatively straightforward and is most easily compared to that of the Casina, which also revolves around a conflict between the adulescens and senex.

The title of the play may refer to either Charinus or Demipho, as both turn out to be successful merchants. It is possible that this ambiguity was intentional. Their mercantile backgrounds seem to carry over into the rest of their lives; in many lines, Charinus and Demipho speak about Pasicompsa in language characterizing her as a commodity to be traded, rather than as a person.

Pasicompsa, whose name translates to "pretty in every respect," is the central point of contention in the play, though she is only onstage for fewer than 5% of the play's lines. She has little control over her own fate, which is dictated by men. Even though Charinus appears to be in love with her, Pasicompsa's non-citizen status means she and Charinus would never be allowed to marry, thus destining Pasicompsa to a life of being passed between owners.

== Translations ==
- Henry Thomas Riley, 1912: Mercator full text
- Paul Nixon, 1916–38
- Charles T. Murphy, 1942
- George Garrett, 1995
- Wolfang de Melo, 2011
