= Volcacius Sedigitus =

Volcacius Sedigitus (Latin pronunciation: [wɔɫˈkaːki.ʊs seːˈdɪɡɪtʊs]) (alternative spelling Volcatius) was the titulus of a Roman literary critic who flourished around 100 b.c., noted for his ranking of those he considered the best Latin comics.

Nothing is known about Sedigitus beyond that Pliny calls him illustrem in poetica and states that he got his cognomen because he was born with six fingers (Latin sex digitī) on each hand. This rare state, known as polydactyly, is caused by a dominant gene. The Romans did not avoid openly referencing blemishes and personal infirmities in the names they gave to public figures. (See Roman naming conventions.)

His origin may have been lowly or from outside the Roman Empire. His nomen gentilicium, "Volcacius", may be derived from the Volcae, a Celtic people.

Aulus Gellius' Noctēs Atticae preserves 13 iambic senarii from the De Poetis in didascaly, in which "Canon", as it has been termed, the principal Latin comics are enumerated in order of merit, from greatest: Caecilius, Plautus, Naevius, Licinius, Atilius, Terence, Turpilius, Trabea, Luscius, Ennius.

Historian Suetonius' work Vita Terentii (Life of Terence) quotes "Vulcacius" as having given a few details about Terence's leaving Rome and consequent disappearing. Namely, Sedigitus said that the playwright was going to Asia, i.e., Pergamum, and was never seen again.

== Bibliography ==
- Joannes Christianus Leuschnerus (1755). Super Volcatio Sedigito, eiusque de comicis quibusdam latinis iudicio probabili (in Latin).
- FLH Eggert (1855). Ueber den Kanon dei Volcatius Sedigitus (in German).
- Henricus Iber (1865). De Volcati Sedigiti Canone (in Latin). Coppenrath.
- Johannes Vahlen (1883). De Volcatio Sedigito et Terentii Eunucho (in Latin).
