= Turpilia gens =

Ancient Roman family

The gens Turpilia was a minor plebeian family at ancient Rome. Members of this gens first came to prominence during the second century BC, with the dramatist Sextus Turpilius, and Titus Turpilius Silanus, one of the Roman commanders during the Jugurthine War. The only member to attain the consulship was Lucius Turpilius Dexter, in 81 BC.

== Origin ==
The nomen Turpilius belongs to a class of gentilicia typically formed from surnames ending in the diminutive suffix -ulus, using the gentile-forming suffix -ilius. Turpilius might be based on a diminutive of the cognomen Turpio.

== Members ==
- Sextus Turpilius, a Roman dramatist of the second century BC. Only the titles of some of his plays, and a few fragments of his work survive. He died at Sinuessa in Latium, at an advanced age, in 101 BC.
- Titus Turpilius Silanus, placed by Quintus Caecilius Metellus in command of the Roman garrison at Vaga in Numidia in 109 BC, during the Jugurthine War. With Jugurtha's encouragement, the inhabitants massacred the Romans, although Silanus escaped to Metellus, who suspected him of complicity with the enemy. Silanus was tried and found guilty, then scourged to death, as he was not a Roman citizen. It later emerged that Silanus was innocent of the charges.
- Turpilia, made a will naming Publius Silius as her heir. In 44 BC, a controversy arose as to whether she had the capacity to make a will, for which reason Silius consulted Cicero, who then wrote to Gaius Trebatius Testa, asking him to advocate on behalf of Silius.
- Turpilius, a skilled painter in Venetia, whom Pliny describes as having lived a better manner of life than was typical of painters of his era. He was the more remarkable for having painted left-handed. Although he had recently died, Pliny reports that some of his best work could be seen at Verona.
- Lucius Turpilius Dexter, consul suffectus for the months of November and December of AD 81.

== See also ==
- List of Roman gentes

== Bibliography ==
- Marcus Tullius Cicero, Epistulae ad Familiares.
- Gaius Sallustius Crispus (Sallust), Bellum Jugurthinum (The Jugurthine War).
- Lucius Mestrius Plutarchus (Plutarch), Lives of the Noble Greeks and Romans.
- Friedrich Heinrich Bothe, Poëtae Scenici Latinorum Fragmenta (Fragments of the Latin Theatrical Poets), Heinrich Vogler, Halberstadt (1822).
- Dictionary of Greek and Roman Biography and Mythology, William Smith, ed., Little, Brown and Company, Boston (1849).
- George Davis Chase, "The Origin of Roman Praenomina", in Harvard Studies in Classical Philology, vol. VIII, pp. 103–184 (1897).
- Paul von Rohden, Elimar Klebs, & Hermann Dessau, Prosopographia Imperii Romani (The Prosopography of the Roman Empire, abbreviated PIR), Berlin (1898).
- T. Robert S. Broughton, The Magistrates of the Roman Republic, American Philological Association (1952–1986).
