= Caecilius Statius =

Roman comic poet (c. 220 BC – c. 166 BC)

- Born: c. 220 BC
- Died: c. 166 BC; Rome
- Writing career
- Genre: comedy

Statius Caecilius, also known as Caecilius Statius (/sɪˈsiːliəs ˈsteɪʃiəs/; c. 220 BC – c. 166 BC), was a Celtic Roman comic poet.

== Life and work ==
A contemporary and intimate friend of Ennius, according to tradition he was born in the territory of the Celtic Insubrian Gauls, probably in Mediolanum, and was probably taken as a prisoner to Rome (c. 200), during the Roman-Gallic wars. Originally a slave, he assumed the name of Caecilius from his patron, probably one of the Metelli. However, according to one source he was free-born of Samnite stock whose family had settled in Cisalpine Gaul following the Second Punic War. In this case he would have been a native speaker of a language close to Latin, rather than Gaulish Insubrian. There he came to the attention of Marcus Caecilius Denter, the Legatus Legionibus Praepositus in Cisalpine Gaul in 200 BC who introduced him in Rome.

He supported himself by adapting Greek plays for the Roman stage from the New Comedy writers, especially Menander, a genre called Comoedia Palliata. If the statement in the life of Terence by Suetonius is correct and the reading sound, Caecilius's judgment was so esteemed that he was ordered to hear Terence's Andria (exhibited 166 BC) read and to pronounce an opinion upon it.

After several failures, Caecilius gained a high reputation. Volcatius Sedigitus, the dramatic critic, places him first amongst the comic poets; Varro credits him with pathos and skill in the construction of his plots; Horace (Epistles, ii. I. 59) contrasts his dignity with the art of Terence. Quintilian (Inst. Orat., x. I. 99) speaks somewhat disparagingly of him, and Cicero, although he admits with some hesitation that Caecilius may have been the chief of the comic poets (De Optimo Genere Oratorum, I), considers him inferior to Terence in style and Latinity (Ad Atticum vii. 3), as was only natural, considering his foreign extraction.

The fact that his plays could be referred to by name alone without any indication of the author (Cicero, De Finibus, ii. 7) is sufficient proof of their widespread popularity. Caecilius holds a place between Plautus and Terence in his treatment of the Greek originals; he did not, like Plautus, confound things Greek and Roman, nor, like Terence, eliminate everything that could not be romanized.

The fragments of his plays are chiefly preserved in Aulus Gellius, who cites several passages from Plocium (The Necklace) together with the original Greek of Menander, affording the only opportunity, apart from Plautus' Bacchides, to make a substantial comparison between a Roman comedy and its Greek model. Caecilius' version, diffuse and by no means close as a translation, does not reproduce the spirit of the original.

His comedies "apparently included serious thoughts on moral and social issues, mostly related to the immediate family, the corresponding relationships, and the impact of one’s personal affairs on one’s position in society."

== Surviving titles and fragments ==
Forty-two titles are known, about half based on Menander, and half on other Greek authors. Approximately 280 fragmentary verses survive. Plocium is the best preserved (45 verses). In addition to that, a large fragment of Obolostates was discovered among the papyri of Herculaneum; it is as yet unedited, but is estimated to contain fragments of 400-500 lines. Some preliminary information was published by the researcher, Knut Kleve, in 1996.

- Aethrio (or, Aetherio)
- Andrea
- Androgynos ("The Hermaphrodite")
- Asotus ("The Debauched Man")
- Chalcia ("The Woman From Chalcis")
- Chrysion
- Dardanus ("Dardanus")
- Davus
- Demandati
- Ephesio ("The Man From Ephesus")
- Epiclerus ("The Heiress")
- Epistathmos
- Epistula ("The Letter")
- Ex Hautu Hestos ("Standing Outside Himself")
- Exul ("The Exile")
- Fallacia ("The Trick")
- Gamos ("Marriage")
- Harpazomene ("The Captured Woman")
- Hymnnis ("Hymnis")
- Hypobolimaeus, or Subditivus
- Hypobolimaeus Chaerestratus
- Hypobolimaeus Rastraria
- Hypobolimaeus Aeschinus
- Imbrii ("Men From Imbros")
- Karine ("The Carian Woman")
- Meretrix ("The Prostitute")
- Nauclerus ("The Ship's Captain")
- Nothus Nicasio ("Nicasio the Bastard")
- Obolostates, or Faenerator ("The Moneylender")
- Pausimachus
- Philumena ("The Beloved Woman")
- Plocium ("The Necklace")
- Polumeni ("Men Being Sold")
- Portitor ("The Door-keeper")
- Progamos ("Man About to Get Married")
- Pugil ("The Boxer")
- Symbolum ("The Symbol, or Token")
- Synaristosae ("Woman Having Lunch Together")
- Synephebi ("Fellow Adolescents")
- Syracusii ("Men From Syracuse")
- Titthe ("The Wet-Nurse")
- Triumphus ("The Triumph")

== See also ==
- Caecilia gens
