= Anal sex =

Sexual activity involving the anus and rectum

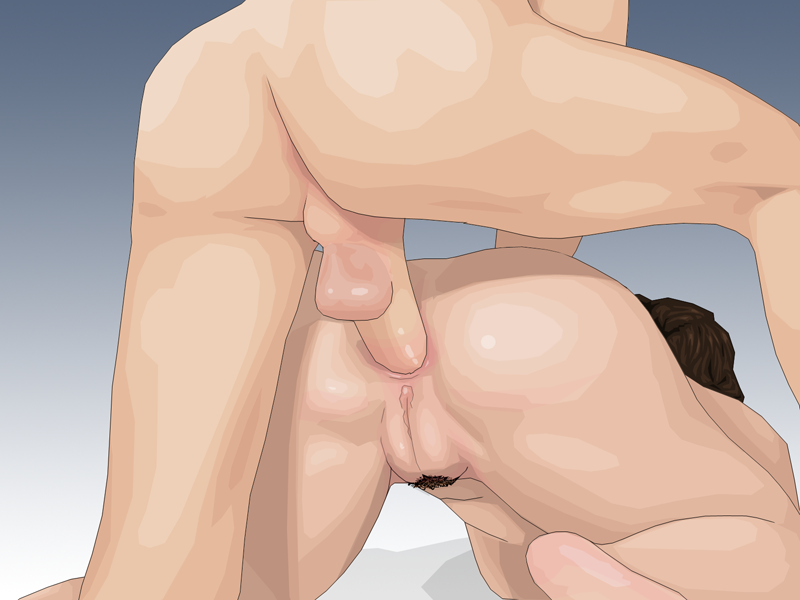
An illustration of heterosexual anal sex

Anal sex or anal intercourse principally means the insertion and thrusting of the erect penis into a person's anus, or anus and rectum, for sexual pleasure. Other forms of anal sex include anal fingering, the use of sex toys, anilingus, and pegging. Although anal sex most commonly means penile–anal penetration, sources sometimes use anal intercourse to exclusively denote penile–anal penetration, and anal sex to denote any form of anal sexual activity, especially between pairings as opposed to anal masturbation.

While anal sex is commonly associated with male homosexuality, research shows that not all homosexual men engage in anal sex and that it is not uncommon in heterosexual relationships. Types of anal sex can also be part of lesbian sexual practices. People may experience pleasure from anal sex by stimulation of the anal nerve endings, and orgasm may be achieved through anal penetration – by indirect stimulation of the prostate in men, indirect stimulation of the clitoris or an area in the vagina (sometimes called the G-spot) in women, and other sensory nerves (especially the pudendal nerve). People may also find anal sex painful, sometimes extremely so, which may be due to psychological factors in some cases.

As with most forms of sexual activity, anal sex can facilitate the spread of sexually transmitted infections (STIs). Anal sex is considered a high-risk sexual practice because of the vulnerability of the anus and rectum. The anal and rectal tissue are delicate and do not, unlike the vagina, provide lubrication. They can easily tear and permit disease transmission, especially if a personal lubricant is not used. Anal sex without protection of a condom is considered the riskiest form of sexual activity, and therefore health authorities such as the World Health Organization (WHO) recommend safe sex practices for anal sex.

Strong views are often expressed about anal sex. It is controversial in various cultures, often because of religious prohibitions against anal sex among males or teachings about the procreative purpose of sexual activity. It may be considered taboo or unnatural, and is a criminal offense in some countries, punishable by corporal or capital punishment. By contrast, anal sex may also be considered a natural and valid form of sexual activity as fulfilling as other desired sexual expressions, and can be an enhancing or primary element of a person's sex life.

== Anatomy and stimulation ==
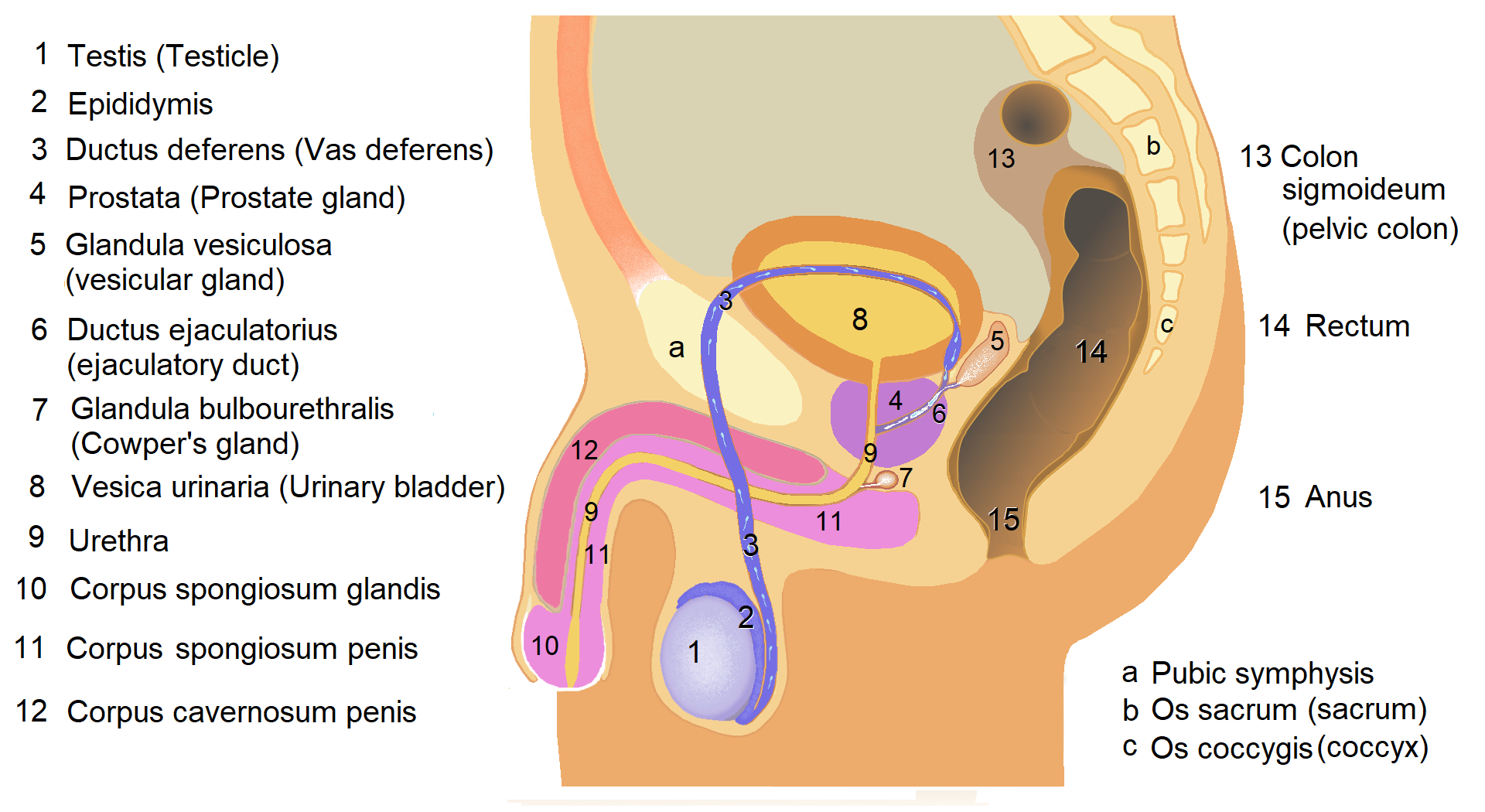
Male genital anatomy, showing the location of the prostate with respect to the rectum

The abundance of nerve endings in the anal region and rectum can make anal sex pleasurable for men and women. The internal and external sphincter muscles control the opening and closing of the anus; these muscles, which are sensitive membranes made up of many nerve endings, facilitate pleasure or pain during anal sex. Human Sexuality: An Encyclopedia states that "the inner third of the anal canal is less sensitive to touch than the outer two-thirds, but is more sensitive to pressure" and that "the rectum is a curved tube about eight or nine inches [20 or 23 cm] long and has the capacity, like the anus, to expand".

Research indicates that anal sex occurs significantly less frequently than other sexual behaviors, but its association with dominance and submission, as well as taboo, makes it an appealing stimulus to people of all sexual orientations. In addition to sexual penetration by the penis, people may use sex toys such as a dildo, a butt plug or anal beads, engage in anal fingering, anilingus, pegging, anal masturbation, figging or fisting for anal sexual activity, and different sex positions may also be included. Fisting is one of the least practiced of the activities, partly because it is uncommon that people can relax enough to accommodate an object as big as a fist being inserted into the anus.

In a male receptive partner, being anally penetrated can produce a pleasurable sensation due to the object of insertion rubbing or brushing against the prostate through the anal wall. This can result in pleasurable sensations and can lead to an orgasm in some cases. Prostate stimulation can produce a deeper orgasm, sometimes described by men as more widespread and intense, longer-lasting, and allowing for greater feelings of ecstasy than orgasm elicited by penile stimulation only. The prostate is located next to the rectum and is the larger, more developed male homologue (variation) to the female Skene's glands. It is also typical for a man to not reach orgasm as a receptive partner solely from anal sex.

General statistics indicate that 70–80% of women require direct clitoral stimulation to achieve orgasm. The vaginal walls contain significantly fewer nerve endings than the clitoris (which has many nerve endings specifically intended for orgasm), and therefore intense sexual pleasure, including orgasm, from vaginal sexual stimulation is less likely to occur than from direct clitoral stimulation in the majority of women. The clitoris is composed of more than the externally visible glans (head). The vagina, for example, is flanked on each side by the clitoral crura, the internal legs of the clitoris, which are highly sensitive and become engorged with blood when sexually aroused. Indirect stimulation of the clitoris through anal penetration may be caused by the shared sensory nerves, especially the pudendal nerve, which gives off the inferior anal nerves and divides into the perineal nerve and the dorsal nerve of the clitoris. Although the anus has many nerve endings, their purpose is not specifically for inducing orgasm, and so a woman achieving orgasm solely by anal stimulation is rare. Stimulation from anal sex can additionally be affected by popular perception or portrayals of the activity, such as erotica or pornography. In pornography, anal sex is commonly portrayed as a desirable, painless routine that does not require personal lubricant; this can result in couples performing anal sex without care, and men and women believing that it is unusual for women, as receptive partners, to find discomfort or pain instead of pleasure from the activity. By contrast, each person's sphincter muscles react to penetration differently; the anal sphincters have tissues that are more prone to tearing, and the anus and rectum, unlike the vagina, do not provide lubrication for sexual penetration. Researchers say adequate application of a personal lubricant, relaxation, and communication between sexual partners are crucial to avoid pain or damage to the anus or rectum. Additionally, ensuring that the anal area is clean and the bowel is empty, for both aesthetics and practicality, may be desired by participants.

== Male to female ==
=== Behaviors and views ===
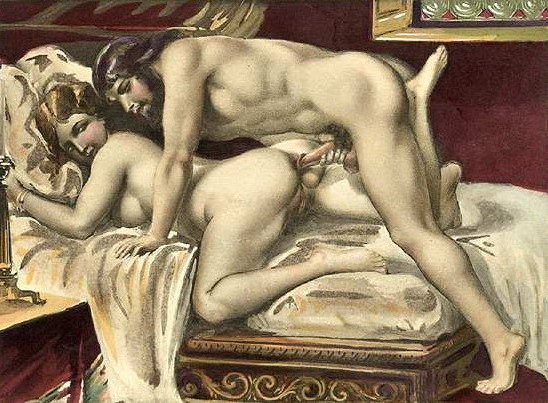
1892 lithograph by Paul Avril depicting male-to-female anal sex.

The anal sphincters are usually tighter than the pelvic muscles of the vagina, which can enhance the sexual pleasure for the inserting male during male-to-female anal intercourse because of the pressure applied to the penis. Men may also enjoy the penetrative role during anal sex because of its association with dominance, because it is made more alluring by a female partner or society in general insisting that it is forbidden, or because it presents an additional option for penetration.

While some women find being a receptive partner during anal intercourse painful or uncomfortable, or only engage in the act to please a male sexual partner, other women find the activity pleasurable or prefer it to vaginal intercourse.

In a 2010 clinical review article of heterosexual anal sex, anal intercourse is used to specifically denote penile-anal penetration, and anal sex is used to denote any form of anal sexual activity. The review suggests that anal sex is exotic among the sexual practices of some heterosexuals and that "for a certain number of heterosexuals, anal intercourse is pleasurable, exciting, and perhaps considered more intimate than vaginal sex".

Anal intercourse is sometimes used as a substitute for vaginal intercourse during menstruation. The likelihood of pregnancy occurring during anal sex is greatly reduced, as anal sex alone cannot lead to pregnancy unless sperm is somehow transported to the vaginal opening. Because of this, some couples practice anal intercourse as a form of contraception, often in the absence of a condom.

Some couples may practice anal sex as a way of preserving female virginity because it is non-procreative and does not tear the hymen; this has been reported in Christian communities in the United States. A person, especially a teenage girl or woman, who engages in anal sex or other sexual activity with no history of having engaged in vaginal intercourse may be regarded as not having yet experienced virginity loss. This is sometimes called technical virginity.

Heterosexuals may view anal sex as "fooling around" or as foreplay; scholar Laura M. Carpenter stated that this view "dates to the late 1600s, with explicit 'rules' appearing around the turn of the twentieth century, as in marriage manuals defining petting as 'literally every caress known to married couples but does not include complete sexual intercourse." One study found US teens who pledged to not have sex until marriage were more likely to engage in anal sex without vaginal sex than teens who had not made a sexual abstinence pledge, and found pledge-takers were just as likely to test positive for an STI five years after taking the pledge as those who had not pledged to abstinence.

=== Prevalence ===
Because most research on anal intercourse addresses men who have sex with men, little data exists on the prevalence of anal intercourse among heterosexual couples. In Kimberly R. McBride's 2010 clinical review on heterosexual anal intercourse and other forms of anal sexual activity, it is suggested that changing norms may affect the frequency of heterosexual anal sex. McBride and her colleagues investigated the prevalence of non-intercourse anal sex behaviors among a sample of men (n=1,299) and women (n=1,919) compared to anal intercourse experience and found that 51% of men and 43% of women had participated in at least one act of oral–anal sex, manual–anal sex, or anal sex toy use. The report states the majority of men (n=631) and women (n=856) who reported heterosexual anal intercourse in the past 12 months were in exclusive, monogamous relationships: 69% and 73%, respectively. The review added that because "relatively little attention [is] given to anal intercourse and other anal sexual behaviors between heterosexual partners", this means that it is "quite rare" to have research "that specifically differentiates the anus as a sexual organ or addresses anal sexual function or dysfunction as legitimate topics. As a result, we do not know the extent to which anal intercourse differs qualitatively from coitus."

According to a 2010 study from the National Survey of Sexual Health and Behavior (NSSHB) that was authored by Debby Herbenick et al., although anal intercourse is reported by fewer women than other partnered sex behaviors, partnered women in the age groups between 18 and 49 are significantly more likely to report having anal sex in the past 90 days. Women engaged in anal intercourse less commonly than men. Vaginal intercourse was practiced more than insertive anal intercourse among men, but 13% to 15% of men aged 25 to 49 practiced insertive anal intercourse.

With regard to adolescents, limited data also exists. This may be because of the taboo nature of anal sex and that teenagers and caregivers subsequently avoid talking to one another about the topic. It is also common for subject review panels and schools to avoid the subject. A 2000 study found that 22.9% of college students who self-identified as non-virgins had anal sex. They used condoms during anal sex 20.9% of the time as compared with 42.9% of the time with vaginal intercourse.

Anal sex being more common among heterosexuals today than it was previously has been linked to the increase in consumption of anal pornography among men, especially among those who view it on a regular basis. Seidman et al. argued that "cheap, accessible and, especially, interactive media have enabled many more people to produce as well as consume pornography," and that this modern way of producing pornography, in addition to the buttocks and anus having become more eroticized, has led to a significant interest in or obsession with anal sex among men.

== Male to male ==
=== Behaviors and views ===
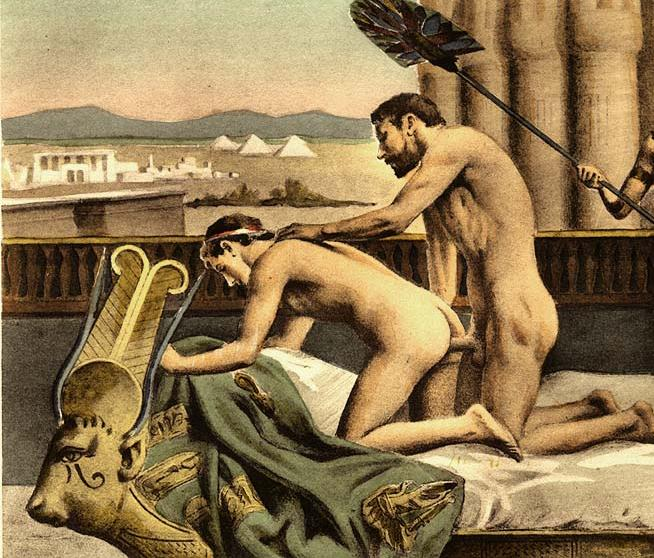
19th-century erotic interpretation of Hadrian and Antinous (detail), by Paul Avril.

Anal sex has been commonly associated with male homosexuality, but not all homosexual men engage in anal sex. Oral sex and mutual masturbation are more common than anal stimulation among men in sexual relationships with other men. Among men who have anal sex with other men, the insertive partner may be referred to as the top and the one being penetrated may be referred to as the bottom. Those who enjoy either role may be referred to as versatile. Men who don’t partake in anal sex at all can be called sides. Though some men who have sex with men may find that being a receptive partner during anal sex makes them question their masculinity, playing bottom in sexual intercourse is at least as common as playing top among western gay and bisexual men and, among committed male couples, anal intercourse is rated as providing the most satisfying orgasms.

=== Prevalence ===
Reports regarding the prevalence of anal sex among men who have sex with men vary. According to 2011 research from the Journal of Sexual Medicine, in the most recent sexual intercourse between homosexual men, the most common behavior was kissing the partner on the mouth, followed by oral sex, and mutual masturbation. Anal sex occurred in less than half of the sexual relationships between homosexual men.

A survey publish by The Advocate in 1994 indicated that 46% of homosexual men who have anal sex, preferred to penetrate their partners, while 43% preferred to be the receptive partner. Other sources suggest that roughly three-fourths of homosexual men have had anal sex at least once, with an equal percentage participating as tops and bottoms. In a 2012 sex survey conducted by the NSSHB in the U.S., among homosexual men who have anal sex, 83.3% report ever having anal sex in the insertive position, and 90% in the receptive position.

According to Weiten et al., anal intercourse is more popular among homosexual male couples than among heterosexual couples, but "it ranks behind oral sex and mutual masturbation" among both sexual orientations in prevalence. Wellings et al. reported that "the equation of 'homosexual' with 'anal' sex among men is common among lay and health professionals alike" and that "yet an Internet survey of 180,000 MSM across Europe (EMIS, 2011) showed that oral sex was most commonly practised, followed by mutual masturbation, with anal intercourse in third place". Though anal sex is less common than oral sex and handjobs among committed male couples, they rate orgasms derived from anal intercourse as more satisfying than that of any other sexual practice.

== Female to male ==
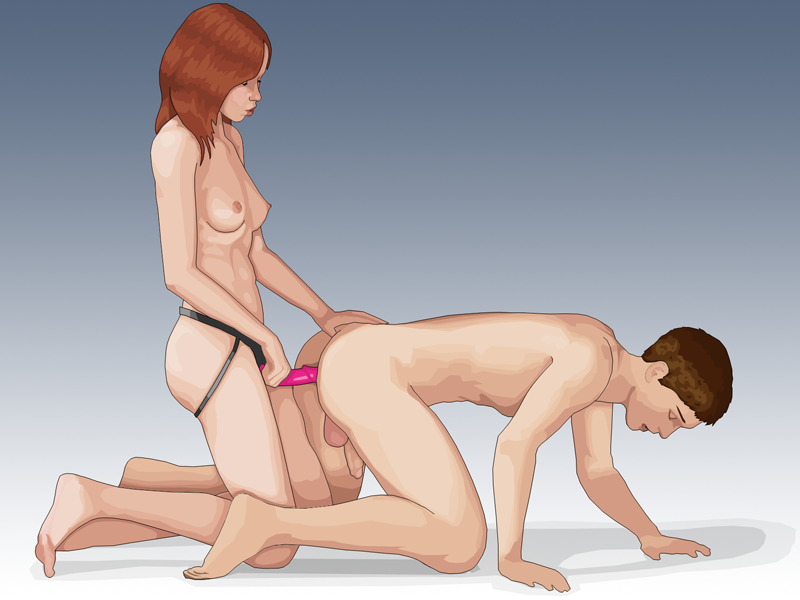
A woman wearing a strap-on dildo about to engage in anal sex with a man (pegging)

Women may sexually stimulate a man's anus by fingering the exterior or interior areas of the anus; they may also stimulate the perineum (which, for males, is between the base of the scrotum and the anus), massage the prostate or engage in anilingus. Sex toys, such as a dildo, may also be used. The practice of a woman penetrating a man's anus with a strap-on dildo for sexual activity is called pegging.

Reece et al. reported in 2010 that receptive anal intercourse is infrequent among men overall, stating that "an estimated 7% of men 14 to 94 years old reported being a receptive partner during anal intercourse".

The BMJ stated in 1999:

There are little published data on how many heterosexual men would like their anus to be sexually stimulated in a heterosexual relationship. Anecdotally, it is a substantial number. What data we do have almost all relate to penetrative sexual acts, and the superficial contact of the anal ring with fingers or the tongue is even less well documented but may be assumed to be a common sexual activity for men of all sexual orientations.

== Female to female ==
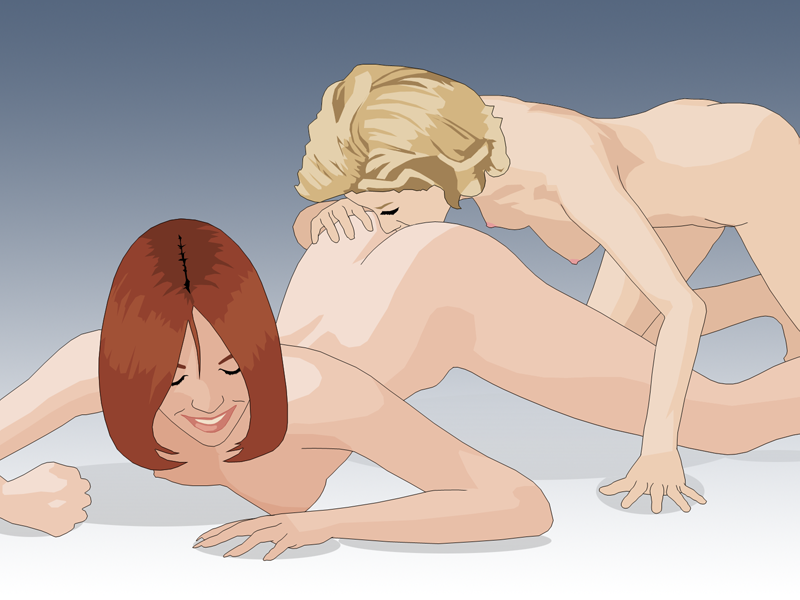
A woman performing anilingus on another woman

With regard to lesbian sexual practices, anal sex includes anal fingering, use of a dildo or other sex toys, or anilingus.

There is less research on anal sexual activity among women who have sex with women compared to couples of other sexual orientations. In 1987, a non-scientific study (Munson) was conducted of more than 100 members of a lesbian social organization in Colorado. When asked what techniques they used in their last ten sexual encounters, lesbians in their 30s were twice as likely as other age groups to engage in anal stimulation (with a finger or dildo). A 2014 study of partnered lesbian women in Canada and the U.S. found that 7% engaged in anal stimulation or penetration at least once a week; about 10% did so monthly and 70% did not at all. Anilingus is also less often practiced among female same-sex couples.

== Health risks ==
=== General risks ===
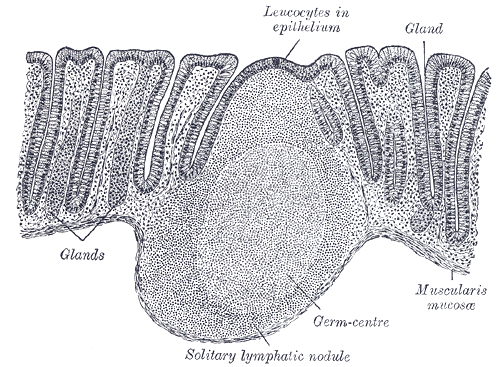
Mucous membranes of the rectum

Anal sex can expose its participants to two principal dangers which are infections due to the high number of infectious microorganisms not found elsewhere on the body, and physical damage to the anus and rectum due to their fragility. Unprotected penile-anal penetration, colloquially known as barebacking, carries a higher risk of passing on sexually transmitted infections (STIs) because the anal sphincter is a delicate, easily torn tissue that can provide an entry for pathogens. Use of condoms, ample lubrication to reduce the risk of tearing, and safer sex practices in general, reduce the risk of STIs. A condom can break or otherwise come off during anal sex, and this is more likely to happen with anal sex than with other sex acts because of the tightness of the anal sphincters during friction. With regard to the degree of stretching and the risk of injury to the anus and rectum of the receptive partner, individual penis size, because it is a trivial factor, is rarely mentioned in the scientific literature.

Unprotected receptive anal sex (with an HIV positive partner) is the sex act most likely to result in HIV transmission.

As with other sexual practices, people without sound knowledge about the sexual risks involved are susceptible to STIs. Because of the view that anal sex is not "real sex" and therefore does not result in virginity loss, or pregnancy, teenagers and other young people who are unaware of the risks of the anal sex may consider vaginal intercourse riskier than anal intercourse, and they also may believe that an STI can only result from vaginal intercourse. It may be because of these views that condom use with anal sex is often reported to be low and inconsistent across all groups in various countries.

Although anal sex alone does not lead to pregnancy, pregnancy can still occur with anal sex or other forms of sexual activity if the penis is near the vagina (such as during intercrural sex or other genital-genital rubbing) and its sperm is deposited near the vagina's entrance and travels along the vagina's lubricating fluids; the risk of pregnancy can also occur without the penis being near the vagina because sperm may be transported to the vaginal opening by the vagina coming in contact with fingers or other non-genital body parts that have come in contact with semen.

There are a variety of factors that make male-to-female anal intercourse riskier than vaginal intercourse for women, including the risk of HIV transmission being higher for anal intercourse than for vaginal intercourse. The risk of injury to the woman during anal intercourse is also significantly higher than the risk of injury to her during vaginal intercourse because of the durability of the vaginal tissues compared to the anal tissues. Additionally, if a man abruptly changes from anal intercourse to vaginal intercourse without a condom or without changing it, infections can arise in the vagina or urinary tract due to bacteria present within the anus; these infections can also result from switching between vaginal sex and anal sex by the use of fingers or sex toys.

Pain during receptive anal sex is formally known as anodyspareunia. Factors predictive of pain during anal sex include inadequate lubrication, feeling tense or anxious, lack of stimulation, as well as lack of social ease with being gay and being closeted. Research has found that psychological factors can in fact be the primary contributors to the experience of pain during anal intercourse and that adequate communication between sexual partners can prevent it, countering the notion that pain is always inevitable during anal sex. The prevalence of anodyspareunia is difficult to measure; in two population studies of men receiving anal sex, 18% and 14% reported experiencing anodyspareunia. In a study of 2002 women, 8.7% of those who had engaged in anal sex reported experiencing severe pain.

=== Damage ===
Anal sex can exacerbate hemorrhoids and therefore result in bleeding; in other cases, the formation of a hemorrhoid is attributed to anal sex. If bleeding occurs as a result of anal sex, it may also be because of a tear in the anal or rectal tissues (an anal fissure) or perforation (a hole) in the colon, the latter of which being a serious medical issue that should be remedied by immediate medical attention. Because of the rectum's lack of elasticity, the anal mucous membrane being thin, and small blood vessels being present directly beneath the mucous membrane, tiny tears and bleeding in the rectum usually result from penetrative anal sex, though the bleeding is usually minor and therefore usually not visible.

Women are at higher risk of damage from anal sex as their anal sphincters are less robust than men's and they have lower anal canal pressures.

By contrast to other anal sexual behaviors, anal fisting poses a more serious danger of damage due to the deliberate stretching of the anal and rectal tissues; anal fisting injuries include anal sphincter lacerations and rectal and sigmoid colon (rectosigmoid) perforation, which might result in death.

Repetitive penetrative anal sex may result in the anal sphincters becoming weakened, which may cause rectal prolapse or affect the ability to hold in feces (a condition known as fecal incontinence). Rectal prolapse is very uncommon, and its causes are not well understood. Kegel exercises have been used to strengthen the anal sphincters and overall pelvic floor, and may help prevent or remedy fecal incontinence.

=== Cancer ===
Most cases of anal cancer are related to infection with the human papilloma virus (HPV). The risk of anal cancer through anal sex is attributed to HPV infection, which is often contracted through unprotected anal sex. Anal cancer is significantly less common than cancer of the colon or rectum (colorectal cancer); the American Cancer Society estimates that in 2023 there were approximately 9,760 new cases (6,580 in women and 3,180 in men) and approximately 1,870 deaths (860 women and 1,010 men) in the United States, and that, though anal cancer has been on the rise for many years, it is mainly diagnosed in adults, "with an average age being in the early 60s" and it "affects women somewhat more often than men."

== Cultural views ==
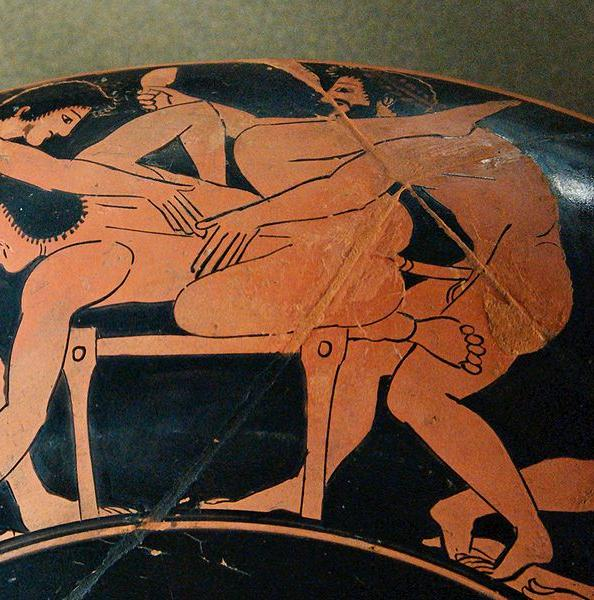
Depiction of anal sex on 510 BCE Attic red-figure kylix

=== General ===
Different cultures have had different views on anal sex throughout human history, with some cultures more positive about the activity than others. Historically, anal sex has been restricted or condemned, especially with regard to religious beliefs; it has also commonly been used as a form of domination, usually with the active partner (the one who is penetrating) representing masculinity and the passive partner (the one who is being penetrated) representing femininity. A number of cultures have especially recorded the practice of anal sex between males, and anal sex between males has been especially stigmatized or punished. In some societies, if discovered to have engaged in the practice, the individuals involved were put to death, such as by decapitation, burning, or even mutilation. Anal sex has been more accepted in modern times; it is often considered a natural, pleasurable form of sexual expression. The buttocks and anus have become more eroticized in modern culture, including via pornography. Engaging in anal sex is still punished in some societies.

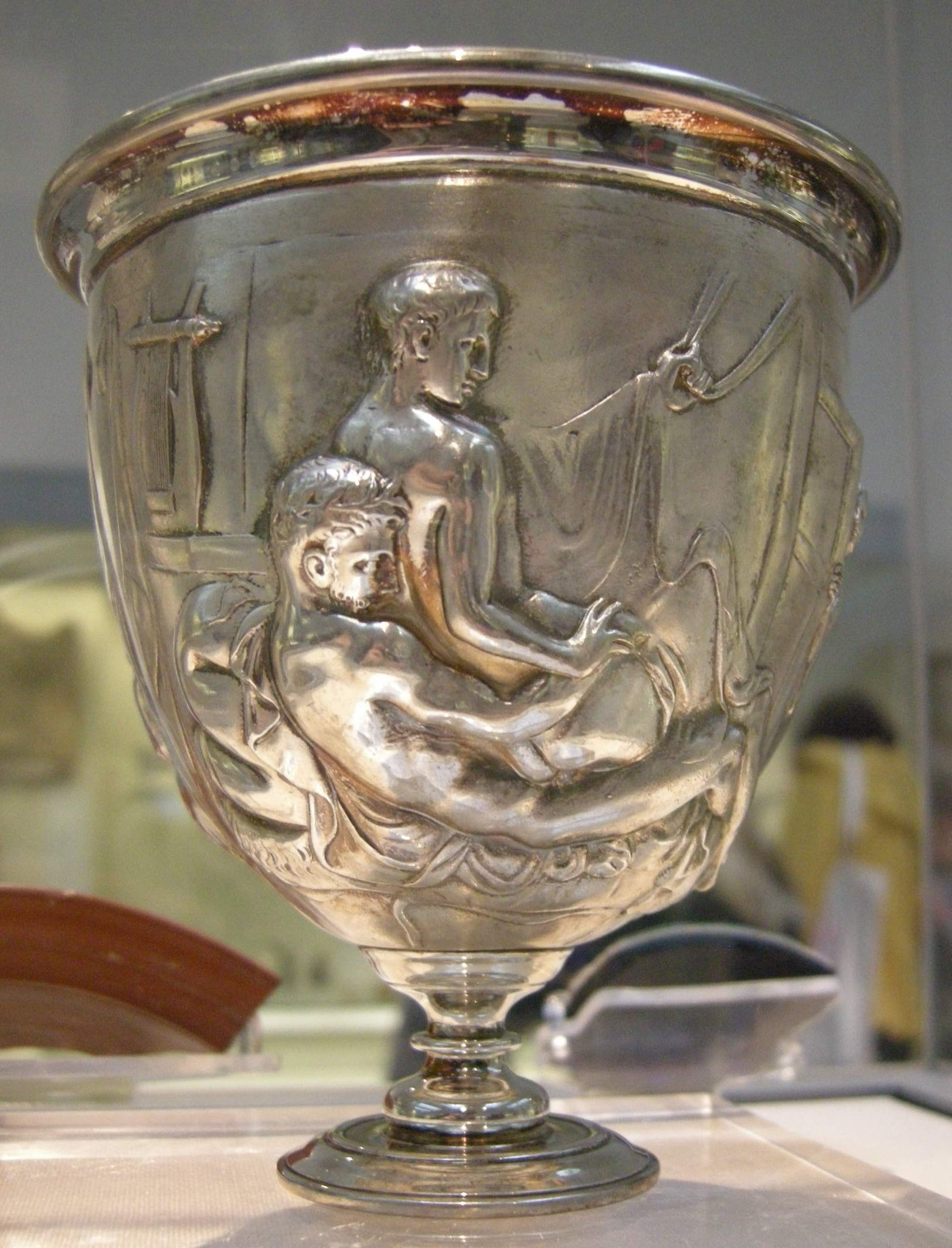
Two Roman males on the Warren Cup, British Museum

=== Western cultures ===
The term Greek love has long been used to refer to anal intercourse, and in modern times, "doing it the Greek way" is sometimes used as slang for anal sex. Male-male anal sex was not a universally accepted practice in Ancient Greece; it was the target of jokes in some Athenian comedies. Aristophanes, for instance, mockingly alludes to the practice, claiming, "Most citizens are europroktoi ('wide-arsed') now." The terms kinaidos, europroktoi, and katapygon were used by Greek residents to categorize men who chronically practiced passive anal intercourse. Pederastic practices in ancient Greece (sexual activity between men and adolescent boys), at least in Athens and Sparta, were expected to avoid penetrative sex of any kind. Greek artwork of sexual interaction between men and boys usually depicted fondling or intercrural sex, which was not condemned for violating or feminizing boys, while male-male anal intercourse was usually depicted between males of the same age-group. Intercrural sex was not considered penetrative and two males engaging in it was considered a "clean" act. Some sources explicitly state that anal sex between men and boys was criticized as shameful and seen as a form of hubris. Evidence suggests that the younger partner in pederastic relationships (i.e., the eromenos) did engage in receptive anal intercourse so long as no one accused him of being 'feminine'.

In later Roman-era Greek poetry, anal sex became a common literary convention, represented as taking place with "eligible" youths: those who had attained the proper age but had not yet become adults. Seducing those not of proper age (for example, non-adolescent children) into the practice was considered very shameful for the adult, and having such relations with a male who was no longer adolescent was considered more shameful for the young male than for the one mounting him. Greek courtesans, or hetaerae, are said to have frequently practiced male-female anal intercourse as a means of preventing pregnancy.

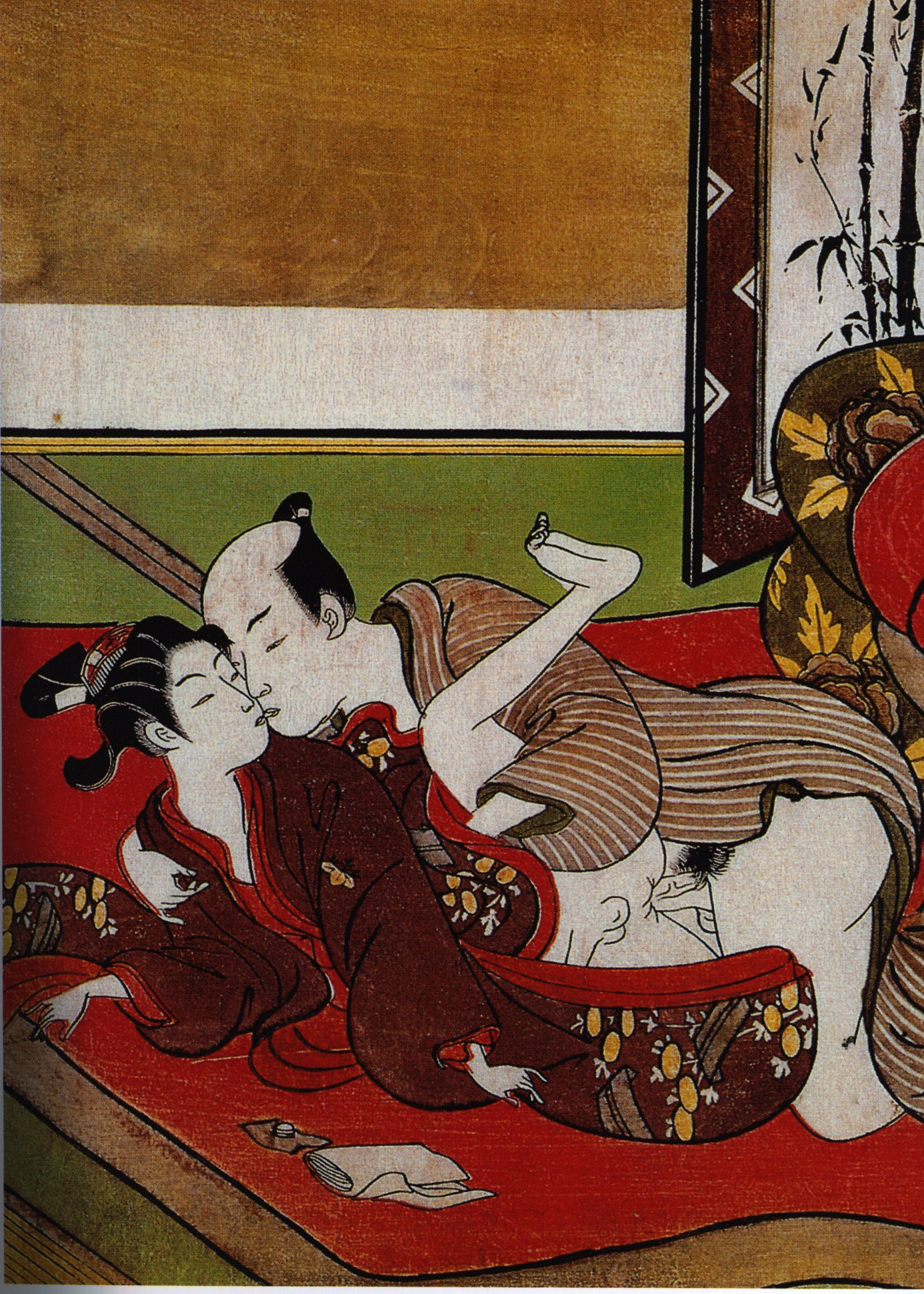
Suzuki Harunobu, A shunga print depicting an older and a younger man ca. 1750

A male citizen taking the passive (or receptive) role in anal intercourse (paedicatio in Latin) was condemned in Rome as an act of impudicitia ('immodesty' or 'chastity'); free men could take the active role with a young male slave, known as a catamite or puer delicatus. The latter was allowed because anal intercourse was considered equivalent to vaginal intercourse in this way; men were said to "take it like a woman" (muliebria pati 'to undergo womanly things') when they were anally penetrated, but when a man performed anal sex on a woman, she was thought of as playing the boy's role. Likewise, women were believed to only be capable of anal sex or other sex acts with women if they possessed an exceptionally large clitoris or a dildo. The passive partner in any of these cases was always considered a woman or a boy because being the one who penetrates was characterized as the only appropriate way for an adult male citizen to engage in sexual activity, and he was therefore considered unmanly if he was the one who was penetrated; slaves could be considered "non-citizen". Although Roman men often availed themselves of their own slaves or others for anal intercourse, Roman comedies and plays presented Greek settings and characters for explicit acts of anal intercourse, and this may be indicative that the Romans thought of anal sex as something specifically "Greek".

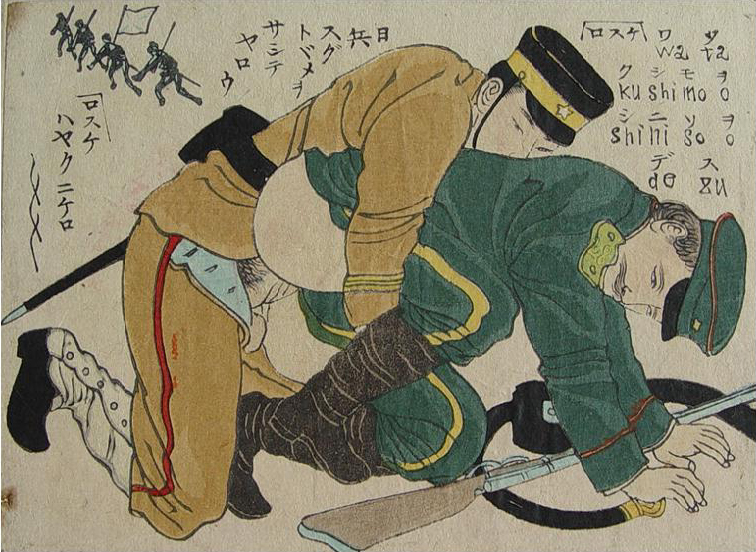
A shunga print from the Russo-Japanese War period (c. 1910), depicting anal sex between a Japanese and a Russian soldier

=== Asian cultures ===
From the earliest records, the ancient Sumerians had very relaxed attitudes toward sex and did not regard anal sex as taboo. Entu priestesses were forbidden from producing offspring and frequently engaged in anal sex as a method of birth control. Anal sex is also obliquely alluded to by a description of an omen in which a man "keeps saying to his wife: 'Bring your backside.'" Other Sumerian texts refer to homosexual anal intercourse. The gala, a set of priests who worked in the temples of the goddess Inanna, where they performed elegies and lamentations, were especially known for their homosexual proclivities. The Sumerian sign for gala was a ligature of the signs for 'penis' and 'anus'. One Sumerian proverb reads: "When the gala wiped off his ass [he said], 'I must not arouse that which belongs to my mistress [i.e., Inanna].'"

In Japan, records (including detailed shunga) show that some males engaged in penetrative anal intercourse with males. Evidence suggestive of widespread male-female anal intercourse in a pre-modern culture can be found in the erotic vases, or stirrup-spout pots, made by the Moche people of Peru; in a survey, of a collection of these pots, it was found that 31 percent of them depicted male-female anal intercourse significantly more than any other sex act. Moche pottery of this type belonged to the world of the dead, which was believed to be a reversal of life. Therefore, the reverse of common practices was often portrayed. The Larco Museum houses an erotic gallery in which this pottery is showcased.

Regarding LGBT rights in Iran, Iran's Penal Code states in Article 109 that "both men involved in same-sex penetrative (anal) or non-penetrative sex will be punished" and "Article 110 states that those convicted of engaging in anal sex will be executed and that the manner of execution is at the discretion of the judge".

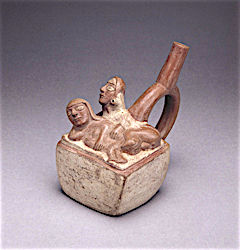
Man and woman having anal sex. Ceramic, Moche Culture. 300 C.E. Larco Museum Collection.

=== Oceanic cultures ===
In precolonial Papua New Guinea, the Kaluli people hosted ceremonies known as bau a once every several years, where older men engage in anal intercourse inside a dark room with boys and younger men across a wide age range (depending on their age during the community's first bau a). The Kaluli people believed that anal intercourse improved boys' growth and maturity; leaders forced disobedient boys to return to their family longhouses. Women did not receive any information of what occurred during the bau a; men and boys used a special code language to conceal their rituals.

The Warlpiri people, along with several other Australian Aboriginal cultures, traditionally designated all initiated boys as the "boy-wife" of their future father-in-law in their traditional system of arranged marriages. Initiation traditionally occurs between the ages of 9 to 12; the subsequent form of pederasty involved anal intercourse, with a boy's anus equated to a girl's vagina in terms of its perceived sexual importance.

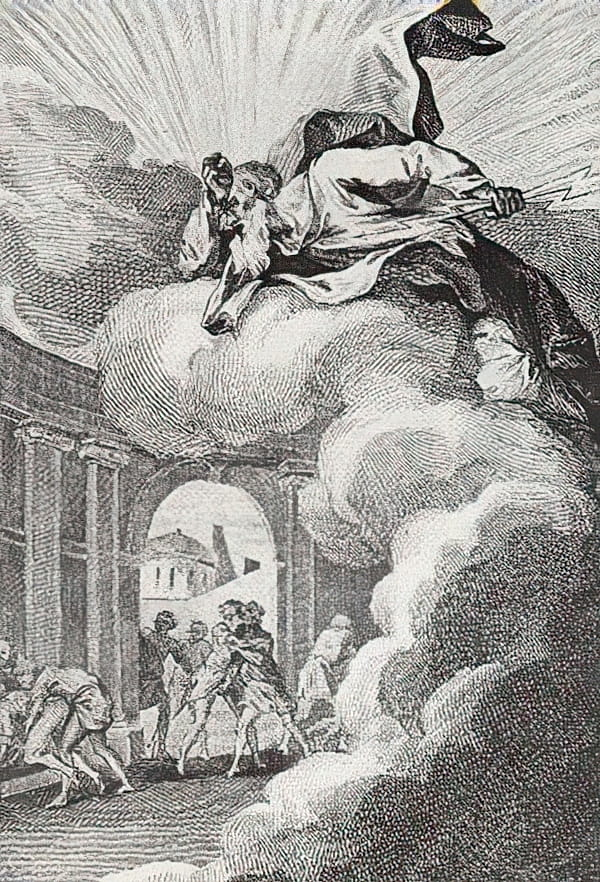
François-Rolland Elluin, Sodomites provoking divine wrath, from Le pot-pourri (1781)

=== Religion ===
==== Judaism ====
The Mishneh Torah, a text considered authoritative by Orthodox Jewish sects, states "since a man's wife is permitted to him, he may act with her in any manner whatsoever. He may have intercourse with her whenever he so desires and kiss any organ of her body he wishes, and he may have intercourse with her naturally or unnaturally [traditionally, unnaturally refers to anal and oral sex], provided that he does not expend semen to no purpose. Nevertheless, it is an attribute of piety that a man should not act in this matter with levity and that he should sanctify himself at the time of intercourse."

==== Christianity ====
Christian texts may sometimes euphemistically refer to anal sex as the peccatum contra naturam ('the sin against nature', after Thomas Aquinas) or Sodomitica luxuria ('sodomitical lusts', in one of Charlemagne's ordinances), or peccatum illud horribile, inter christianos non nominandum ('that horrible sin that among Christians is not to be named').

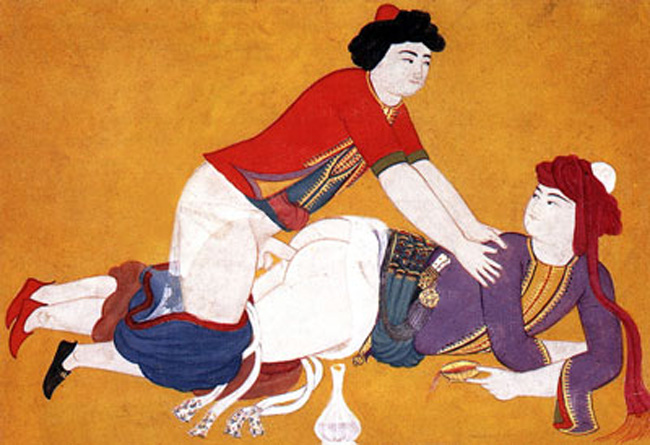
Ottoman illustration depicting two young men having sex (from Sawaqub al-Manaquib)

==== Islam ====
Liwat, or the sin of Lot's people, which has come to be interpreted as referring generally to same-sex sexual activity, is commonly officially prohibited by Islamic sects; there are parts of the Quran which talk about smiting on Sodom and Gomorrah, and this is thought to be a reference to "unnatural" sex, and so there are hadith and Islamic laws which prohibit it. Same-sex male practitioners of anal sex are called luti or lutiyin in plural and are seen as criminals in the same way that a thief is a criminal.

== Other animals ==
As a form of non-reproductive sexual behavior in animals, anal sex both in heterosexual and male homosexual dyads, i.e. pairs of animals, has been observed in a few other primates, both in captivity and in the wild.

== See also ==
- Anal eroticism
- Ass to mouth
- Autosodomy
- Coprophilia
- Creampie (sexual act)
- Felching
- Gay bowel syndrome
- Grinding (dance)
- Klismaphilia
- Sexual practices between men
- Sexual practices between women
- Sodomy law
