= Anal eroticism =

Concept in psychoanalysis

Anal eroticism, in psychoanalysis, is sensuous pleasure derived from anal sensations. Sigmund Freud, the founder of psychoanalysis, hypothesized that the anal stage of childhood psychosexual development was marked by the predominance of anal eroticism.

== Developmental ==
In 1973, the psychoanalyst D. W. Winnicott spoke of "the tremendous pleasure that belongs to the doing of a motion just exactly when the impulse comes...another little orgy that enriches the life of the infant". In Sigmund Freud's theory of psychosexual development, the anus becomes the primary erogenous zone between the ages of 18 months and three years. The main social context for this experience is the process of toilet training, where anal pleasure becomes associated with the control of bowel movements. In his 1908 article Character and Anal Erotism, Freud argued that, through reaction formations and sublimation, anal eroticism could turn in later life into character traits such as obstinacy, orderliness and meanness.

The psychoanalyst Sándor Ferenczi extended Freud's findings to cover the sublimation of anal eroticism into aesthetic experiences such as painting and sculpture, as well as into an interest in money. In 1946, the psychoanalyst Otto Fenichel linked anal eroticism to feelings of disgust, to masochism, and to pornography.

The psychoanalyst Julia Kristeva would subsequently explore anal eroticism in connection with her concept of abjection.

== See also ==
- Anal beads
- Anal fingering
- Anal fisting
- Anal masturbation
- Anal sex
- Anilingus
- Butt plug
- Figging
- Klismaphilia
- Pegging
