= Gay bowel syndrome =

Outdated medical term

"Gay bowel syndrome" is an obsolete classification of various sexually transmitted rectal infections observed in men who have sex with men. It was first used by Henry L. Kazal in 1976 to describe conditions he observed in his proctology practice, which had many gay patients.

== Early history ==
The term was first used in the pre-HIV era, by Kazal et al. in 1976. After Kazal, the term was used sporadically in medical literature from the 1970s to refer to a complex of gastrointestinal symptoms affecting gay men. The term was not specific to any particular disease or infection, and was used clinically to describe proctitis, diarrhea, and a variety of other complaints caused by a wide range of infectious organisms. Reported causes include herpes viruses, syphilis, gonorrhea, chlamydia, campylobacter, and shigellosis, as well as a variety of protozoal infections. The concept of "gay bowel syndrome" was later expanded to include various opportunistic cancers. Transmission was considered to take place by anal sex, a fecal-oral route, or both. Following the onset of the AIDS epidemic, the reported incidence of these complaints has declined, likely as a result of safer sexual practices.

== Criticism and decline in use ==
In 1985, an article in the peer-reviewed journal Gut said that "gay bowel syndrome" was not a syndrome, and had limitations in medical use:

The "gay bowel syndrome" was first used to describe not a syndrome, but a list of conditions. The term hides the problems facing the gastroenterologist. Firstly, the sexual orientation of a patient may not be easily ascertainable in the setting of a general outpatient clinic. Secondly, many infections of the gay bowel are asymptomatic and are missed without full microbiological screening. Thirdly, coinfection is common and the organism isolated may not be causing the symptoms and signs. Finally, the bowel has limited and non-specific clinical and histopathological responses to many infections.

A 1997 article in the Journal of Homosexuality argued that use of the term should be abandoned:

It is apparent that Gay Bowel Syndrome is an essentialized category of difference that is neither gay-specific, confined to the bowel, nor a syndrome. The use and diagnosis of Gay Bowel Syndrome must be abandoned.

The term was withdrawn as "outdated" by the Canadian Association of Gastroenterologists in 2004. The U.S. Centers for Disease Control confirmed the term was already informal and no longer in use by 2005.

The 2009 McGraw-Hill Manual of Colorectal Surgery states that "gay bowel syndrome" is considered obsolete and derogatory:

Coined in the pre-HIV era, the term "gay bowel syndrome" comprised a rather unselective potpourri of unusual anorectal and GI symptoms experienced by homosexual males... with better understanding of the underlying causes, this term is outdated: the derogatory terminology should be abandoned and more specific entities and terms recognized and used.

Activist Michael Petrelis said "it is very much a defamation to say ‘gay bowel syndrome', when what they’re really talking about is parasites", and Marty Algaze of the Gay Men's Health Crisis argued: "Sickle cell anemia is primarily seen in African Americans, but would you call it African American anemia? People would never accept that." Activist and author Michael Scarce criticized the concept in his 1999 book Smearing the Queer: Medical Bias in the Health Care of Gay Men.

== See also ==
- Anal sex § Health risks
- Men who have sex with men § Sexually transmitted infections
