= Anal masturbation =

Sexual stimulation of one's own anus

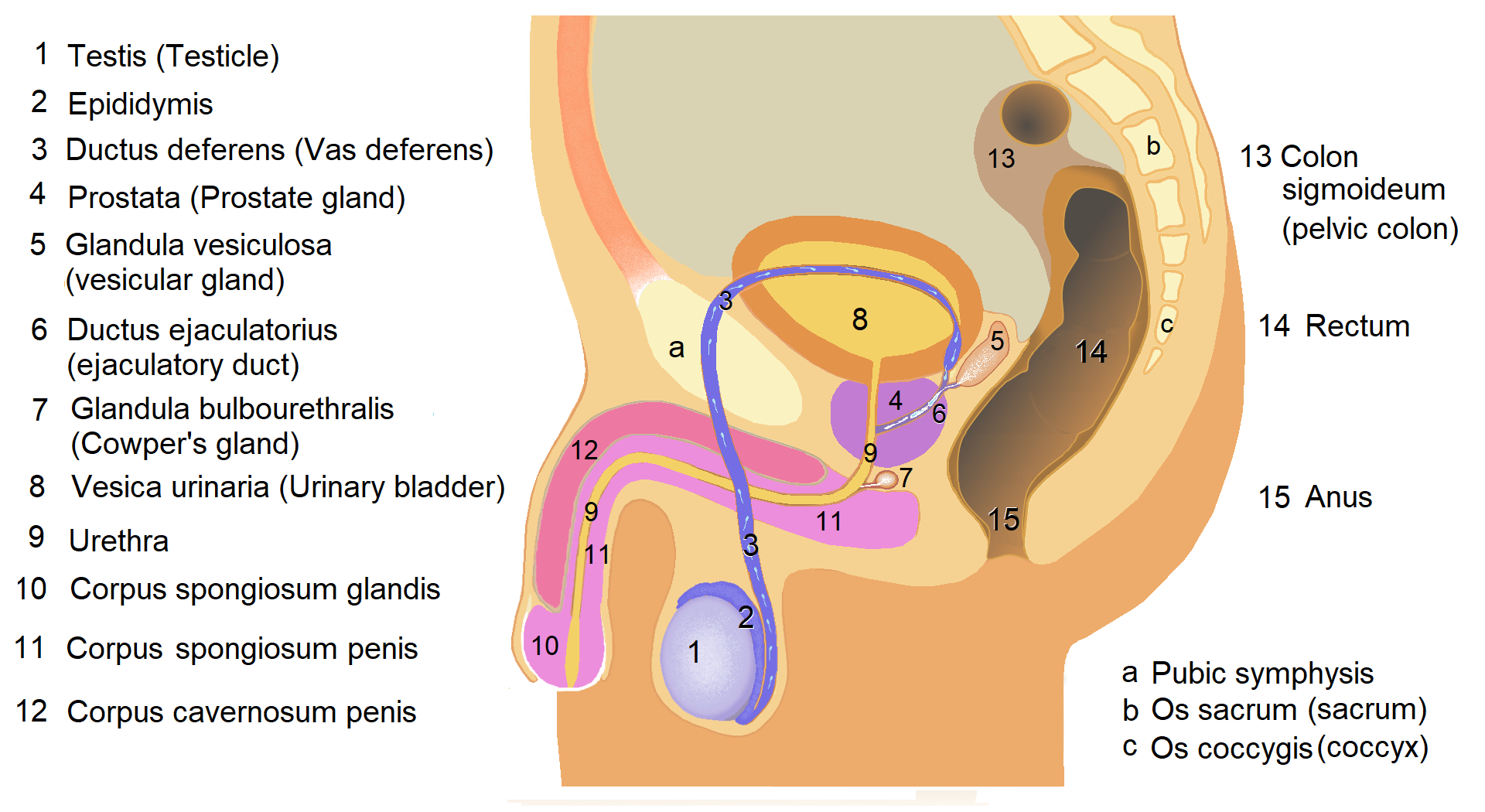
The male sexual organs

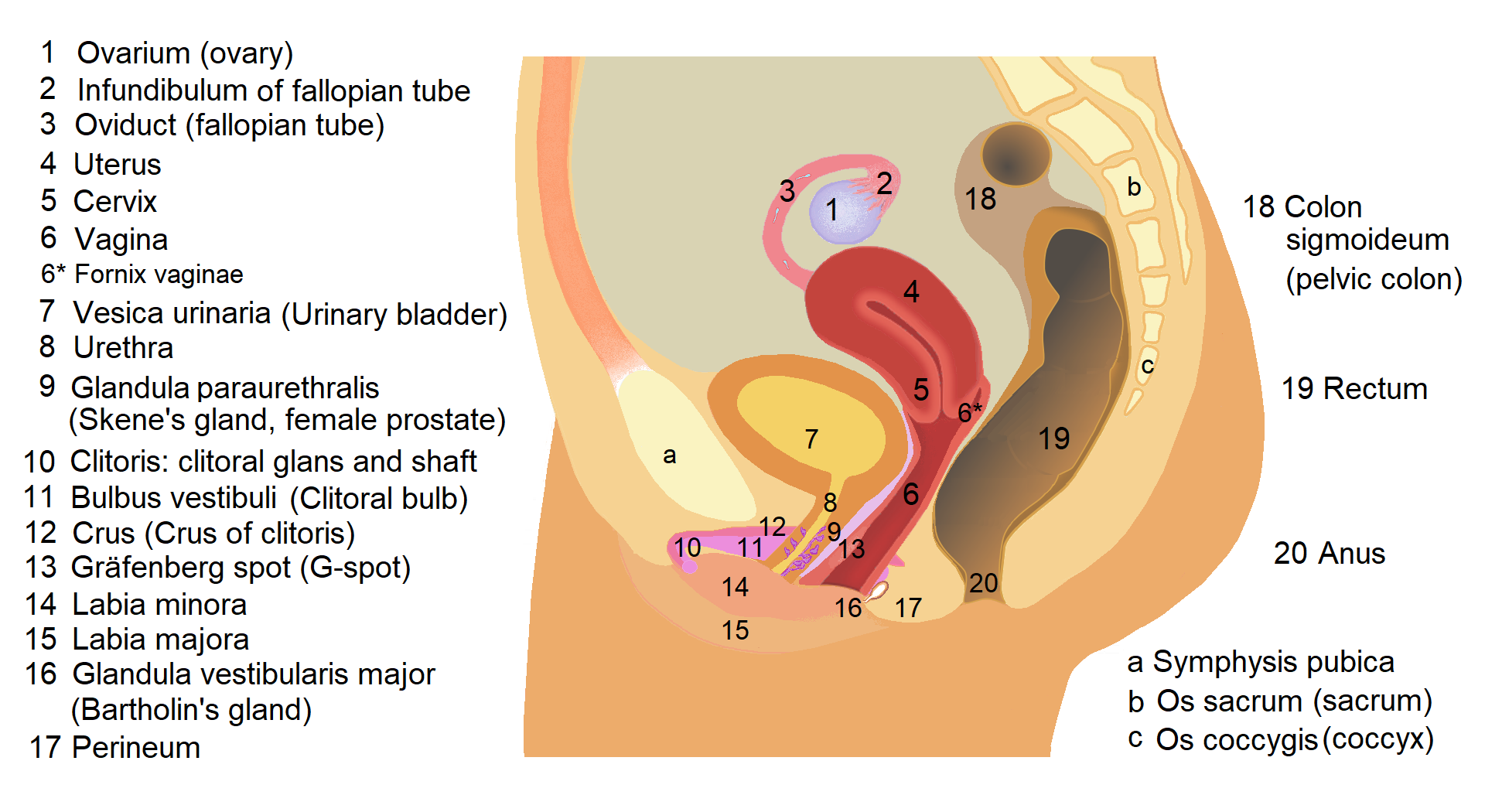
The female sexual organs

Anal masturbation is an autoerotic practice in which a person masturbates by sexually stimulating their own anus and rectum. Common methods of anal masturbation include manual stimulation of the anal opening and the insertion of an object or objects. Items inserted may be sex toys such as anal beads, butt plugs, dildos, vibrators, rectal thermometers or specially designed prostate massagers or enemas.

== Method ==
Pleasure can be derived from anal masturbation due to the nerve endings in the anal and rectal areas.

=== Men ===
In men, orgasmic function through genitalia depends in part on the healthy functioning of the smooth muscles surrounding the prostate, and of the pelvic floor muscles. Prostate stimulation can be especially pleasurable because it stimulates sensitive nerve endings. Some men find the quality of their orgasm to be significantly enhanced by the use of a butt plug or other anally inserted item during sexual activity. It is typical for a man to not reach orgasm as a receptive partner solely from anal sex.

=== Women ===
Some women also engage in anal masturbation. Alfred Kinsey in "Sexual Behavior in the Human Female" documented that "There still [are] other masturbatory techniques which were regularly or occasionally employed by some 11 percent of the females in the sample ... enemas, and other anal insertions, ... were employed."

=== Other methods ===
Enemas can be used as a form of anal masturbation, as noted above by Kinsey, sexual arousal by enemas being known as klismaphilia, but also, enemas or anal douches can, for hygienic reasons, be taken prior to anal masturbation if desired.

=== Autosodomy ===
Autosodomy is the penetration of one's own anus with their own penis. This is possible if the penis is long enough and the genitals are properly maneuvered.

== Safety ==
Insertion of foreign objects into the anus is not without dangers. Unsafe anal masturbation methods cause harm and a potential trip to the hospital emergency room. However, anal masturbation can be carried out in greater safety by ensuring that the bowel is emptied before beginning, the anus and rectum are sufficiently lubricated and relaxed throughout, and the inserted object is not of too great a size.

=== Objects ===
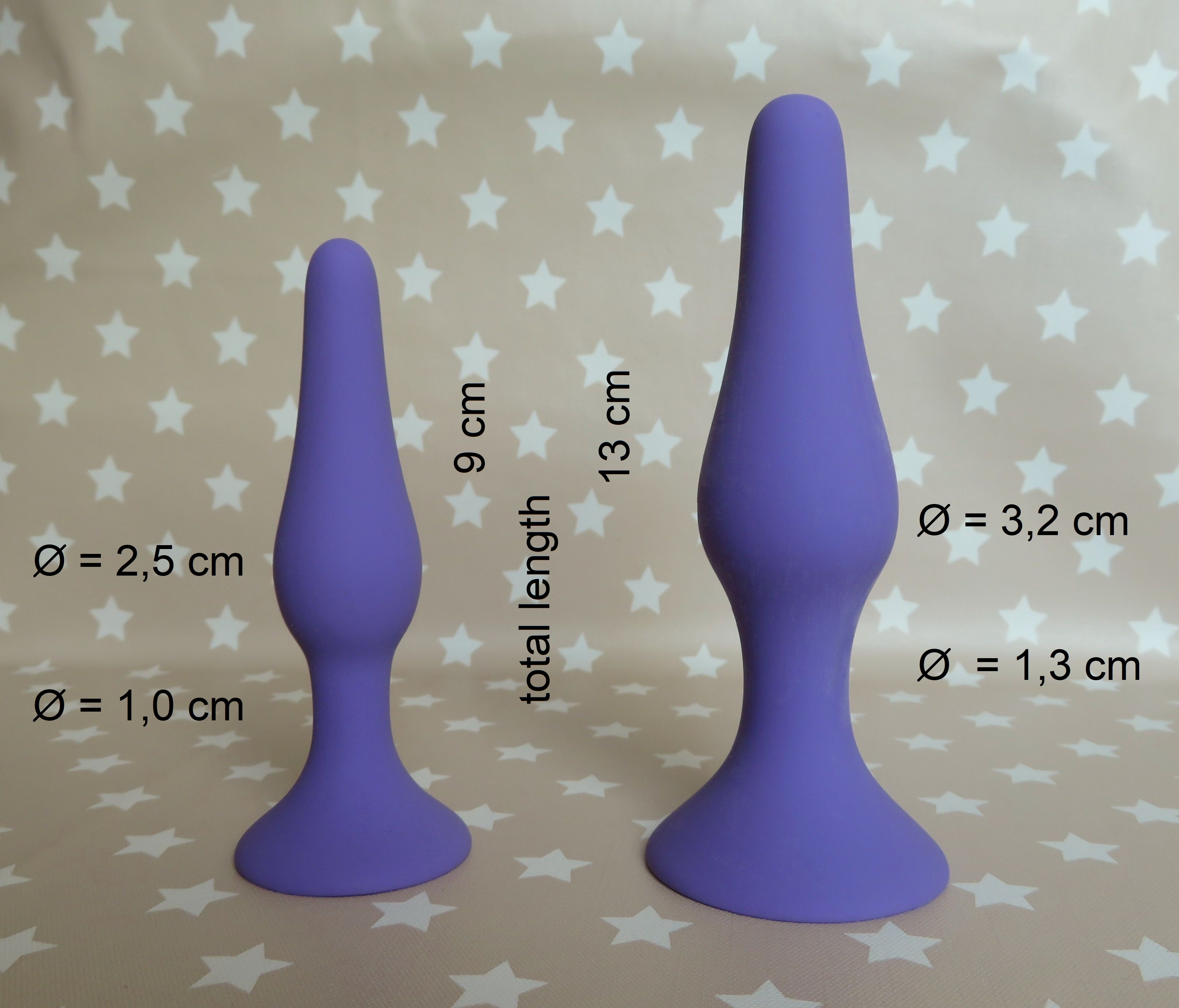
Soft slim butt plugs made of silicone

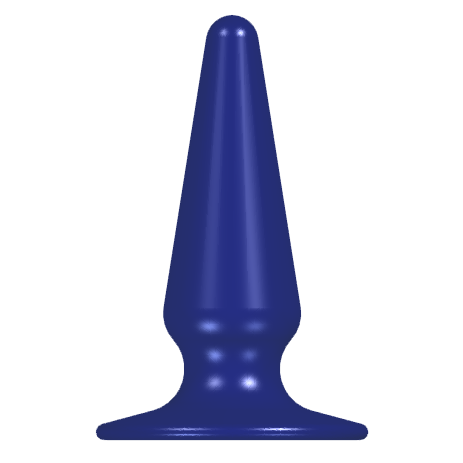
Butt plugs often have a flared base and are free of seams.

Some anal stimulators are purposely ribbed or have a wave pattern in order to enhance pleasure and simulate intercourse. Stimulating the rectum with a rough-edged object or a finger (for the purposes of medically stimulating a bowel movement or other reasons) may lead to rectum wall tearing, especially if the fingernail is left untrimmed. Vegetables have rough edges and may have microorganisms on the surface, and thus could lead to infection if not sanitized before use.

=== Risks associated with bleeding ===
Minor injuries that cause some bleeding to the rectum pose measurable risk and often need treatment. Injury can be contained by cessation of anal stimulation at any sign of injury, bleeding, or pain. While minor bleeding may stop of its own accord, individuals with serious injury, clotting problems, or other medical factors could face serious risk and require medical attention.

Prolonged or heavy bleeding can indicate a life-threatening situation, as the intestinal wall can be damaged, leading to internal injury of the peritoneal cavity and peritonitis, which can be fatal. Carefully using implements without sharp edges or rough surfaces carries a lower risk of damage to the intestinal wall.

The treatment for persistent or heavy bleeding will require a visit to an emergency room for a sigmoidoscopy and cauterization in order to prevent further loss of blood. Apart from the volume of blood that is lost into the rectum, other easily observable indications that medical intervention is urgently needed as a result of blood loss are an elevated heart rate, a general feeling of faintness or weakness, and a loss of pleasure from the act.

=== Rectal foreign bodies ===
Butt plugs normally have a flared base to prevent complete insertion and should be carefully sanitized before and after use. Sex toys, including objects for rectal insertion, should not be shared in order to minimize the risk of disease. Objects such as lightbulbs or anything breakable such as glass or wax candles cannot safely be used in anal masturbation, as they may break or shatter, causing highly dangerous medical situations.

Some objects can become lodged above the lower colon and could be seriously difficult to remove. Such foreign bodies should not be allowed to remain in place. Medical help should be sought if the object does not emerge on its own. Immediate assistance is recommended if the object is not a proper rectal toy (like a plug or something soft, for example), if it is either too hard, too large, has projections, or slightly sharp edges, or if any trace of injury happens (bleeding, pain, cramps). Small objects with dimensions similar to small stools are less likely to become lodged than medium-sized or large objects as they can usually be expelled by forcing a bowel movement. It is always safest if a graspable part of the object remains outside the body.

== Hygiene ==
The biological function of the anus is to expel intestinal gas and feces from the body; therefore, when engaging in anal masturbation, hygiene is important. One may wish to cover butt plugs or other objects with a condom before insertion and then dispose of the condom afterward. To minimize the potential transfer of germs between sexual partners, there are practices of safe sex recommended by healthcare professionals. Oral or vaginal infection may occur similarly to penile anus-to-mouth or anilingus practices.

== See also ==
- Anal eroticism
- Anal sex
- Prostate massage
