= Scarce (disambiguation) =

That which is scarce is of insufficient quantity to fulfill all human wants and needs.

Scarce may also refer to:

- Scarce (band), an American alternative rock band
- Scarce (surname), a surname
