= Rhaphanidosis =

Punishment for adultery in Classical Athens

Rhaphanidosis, or radishing, is the act of inserting the root of a radish into the anus. It is mentioned by Aristophanes as a punishment for adultery in Classical Athens in the fifth and fourth century BC. It was also a punishment for other sex-related crimes, such as promiscuity and sodomy. Later classical references to the punishment include Catullus 15, where percurrent raphanique mugilesque (both radishes and mullets will run you through) is threatened against those who cast lascivious eyes on a boy (puer) the poet cares for.

== Historicity ==
There is some doubt as to whether the punishment was ever enforced or whether the reference to it in the debate between Right and Wrong in The Clouds of Aristophanes should be understood as signifying public humiliation in general.

== See also ==
- Figging
- Gingering
- Impalement
