= Adultery in Classical Athens =

In Classical Athens, there was no exact equivalent of the English term "adultery", but the similar moicheia (Ancient Greek: μοιχεία) was a criminal offence often translated as adultery by scholars. Athenian moicheia was restricted to illicit sex with free women, and so men could legally have extramarital sex with slaves and prostitutes. Famously, Athenian culture and adultery laws considered seduction of a citizen woman a worse crime than rape.

Under Athenian law, killing a moichos who had been caught in the act was legally permissible as justifiable homicide. This seems to have been rare in practice, and adulterers were more commonly prosecuted, ransomed for money, or physically abused. The physical abuse and humiliation of adulterers is depicted in several surviving ancient Greek comedies. Punishments for women involved in moicheia include divorce and the loss of citizenship rights, if they were married, and being sold into slavery, if unmarried – though no instances of this latter penalty being carried out are known.

== Definition ==
The act which is usually rendered in English as "adultery" was called moicheia (μοιχεία) in Greek. Moicheia was defined more broadly than the English "adultery", however, referring to any "seduction of a free woman under the protection of a kyrios". Thus, sex with the wife, daughter, or sister of a free man were all considered to be instances of moicheia. In at least one case, detailed in the speech "Against Neaera", we know that an alleged moichos was imprisoned based on a father's right to punish moicheia committed against his daughter. In Athenian law, moicheia was always committed by men upon women.

Against this view of moicheia, David Cohen has argued that it was limited to sex with citizens' wives, and that the word moichos was synonymous with the modern English "adulterer", but this view has been largely rejected by other scholars.

Married men were not considered to have committed adultery if they were to have sexual relationships with slaves or prostitutes.

== Adultery and the law ==
An Athenian law on adultery (graphe moicheias) is known to have existed, though it has not survived. Christopher Carey argues that the law cited at §28 of On the Murder of Eratosthenes is an otherwise unknown law on adultery, which prescribed the actions to be taken in cases of moicheia and specified killing the culprit as an option.

Along with the law on moicheia reconstructed by Carey, three Athenian laws which concerned moicheia have survived, all preserved in the works of fourth-century BC orators. The first of these prohibited a man from living with an adulterous wife, and an adulterous wife from taking part in public religious ceremonies. The second exempted a kyrios who killed a moichos caught in the act.

The third surviving law concerning moicheia protected an accused adulterer from illegal imprisonment. It is cited by Apollodoros in Against Neaera, and modern editors have largely taken it to mean that a man who has sex with a prostitute cannot be indicted for moicheia. Johnstone, however, argues for a different reading of the passage, which protects men from being imprisoned for moicheia in cases where they have been involved in business relationships with women.

According to the Athenian orator Lysias, moicheia was considered to be a more serious crime than rape or sexual assault, because seduction of a woman implied a long-term relationship, where her legitimate family had their place in her affections supplanted. Historians have generally believed Lysias's claim that seduction was considered to be more serious than rape, though not all have accepted his explanation for this. For instance, Christopher Carey argues that this explanation was merely a post-hoc rationalisation, and that in fact the law was more concerned with the possibility of illegitimate children in cases of adultery. The view that seduction was considered to be a worse crime than rape has been questioned by more recent scholars, however. For example, Eva Cantarella, dismisses Lysias's claim as "ingenious but totally inconsistent", and argues that rape and adultery could both be punished with a range of penalties, of which in both cases the most severe was death. Similarly, Edward Harris observes that portraying rape as a less severe crime than adultery is in the interest of the speaker in Lysias's speech, and argues that rape could be prosecuted as hubris, for which death was a potential penalty.

=== History ===
The law which allowed the killing of a moichos caught in the act as a justifiable homicide, seems to have been part of the homicide law set down by Draco, while the laws which set down alternative penalties for adulterers were probably Solonian in origin. Mistreating and ransoming adulterers seems to have a much longer history, however, with precedents going back to Homeric times. For instance, in Book VIII of the Odyssey, Hephaistos, the husband of Aphrodite, captures Ares and Aphrodite in bed together and displays them in front of the other gods to be ridiculed.

=== Sanctions ===
There were at least four possible responses to adultery open to the aggrieved party. Firstly, if the adulterer was caught in the act, they could be summarily executed by the kyrios of the woman they were found with. This was legal both under the Draconian code's provisions for justifiable homicide, and, as Carey believes, under the Solonian law on moicheia. This is what Euphiletos claimed had happened in On the Murder of Eratosthenes. However, this was probably an uncommon response, and modern scholars generally believe that this penalty was only rarely exacted.

Andrew Wolpert lists three alternatives to this course of action: to charge the offender in a court of law, to extract a financial penalty, or to subject the offender to physical abuse. The punishment for an offender convicted of moicheia is unknown. However, in many public actions the jury had the responsibility for selecting the punishment, and Eva Cantarella suggests that this could have been the case for the graphe moicheias.

The most common means of punishing adulterers probably involved the last of these options: physical abuse with the aim of humiliating the offender. Christopher Carey believes that this maltreatment of a moichos was explicitly permitted in law. However, Sara Forsdyke has disagreed, arguing that it was in fact a form of extra-legal collective punishment.

Comic sources describe the abuse and humiliation of those guilty of moicheia, including a scene in the Clouds where Aristophanes refers to an adulterer being punished by the insertion of a radish into his anus. Other comic punishments for adulterers include the removal of pubic hair. Konstantinos Kapparis has argued that both of these punishments were intended to humiliate the adulterer by feminising them, because depilation was a standard part of a female beauty regimen in Classical Athens, and because being penetrated was associated with femininity. The historian David Cohen has questioned the idea that these comic forms of abuse were carried out in reality, but Konstantinos Kapparis and Christopher Carey have argued that the reason that these jokes had such longevity in comedy was precisely because they were a reflection of reality.

A married woman who was discovered committing adultery would be divorced and prohibited from participating in public religion. If her husband did not wish to divorce her, he might lose his citizen rights. Jim Roy suggests that a husband might have risked this, however, either to keep the dowry or to avoid scandal. An unmarried woman caught in adultery by her kyrios could be sold into slavery, though there is no known instance of this penalty in fact being carried out.

== Comparison with other Greek cities ==
In his dialogue Hieron, Xenophon claims that the right to kill a moichos was enshrined in law not just in Athens but throughout the cities of Greece. However, the adultery laws which we know of through other sources from elsewhere in Greece tend to enforce either financial penalty or abuse and humiliation, rather than death, as a punishment.

In ancient Gortyn, the penalty for seduction was a fine of up to 200 staters. Gortynian adultery law said that unless payment was made within five days, the kyrios could abuse the adulterer however he wished, paralleling the abuse of adulterers permitted in Athens.

In various other Greek cities, we have stories of adulterers being publicly humiliated as a form of punishment. According to Plutarch, the people of Cyme called adulterous women "donkey riders". Aristotle says that in Lepreum in the Peloponnese, male adulterers were bound and led around the city for three days, while adulteresses were made to stand in the agora in a transparent tunic for eleven days. In Pisidia, we are told that adulterers and adulteresses were paraded around the city together on a donkey.

In some places the punishment for adultery could be more severe, though again stopping short of death. In Epizephryian Locris in southern Italy, for instance, a moichos could be punished by blinding. In other cities, such as Lepreum and Cumae, the moichos was at risk of atimia – the loss of civic rights.

== See also ==
- Adultery
- Oikos
- Women in Classical Athens
