= Scarce (surname) =

Scarce is a surname. Notable people with the surname include:

- Kevin Scarce (born 1952), Royal Australian Navy admiral
- Mac Scarce (born 1949), American baseball player
- Michael Scarce (21st century), American writer, researcher, and advocate
- Yhonnie Scarce (born 1973), Australian glass artist
