= Anal beads =

Sex toy

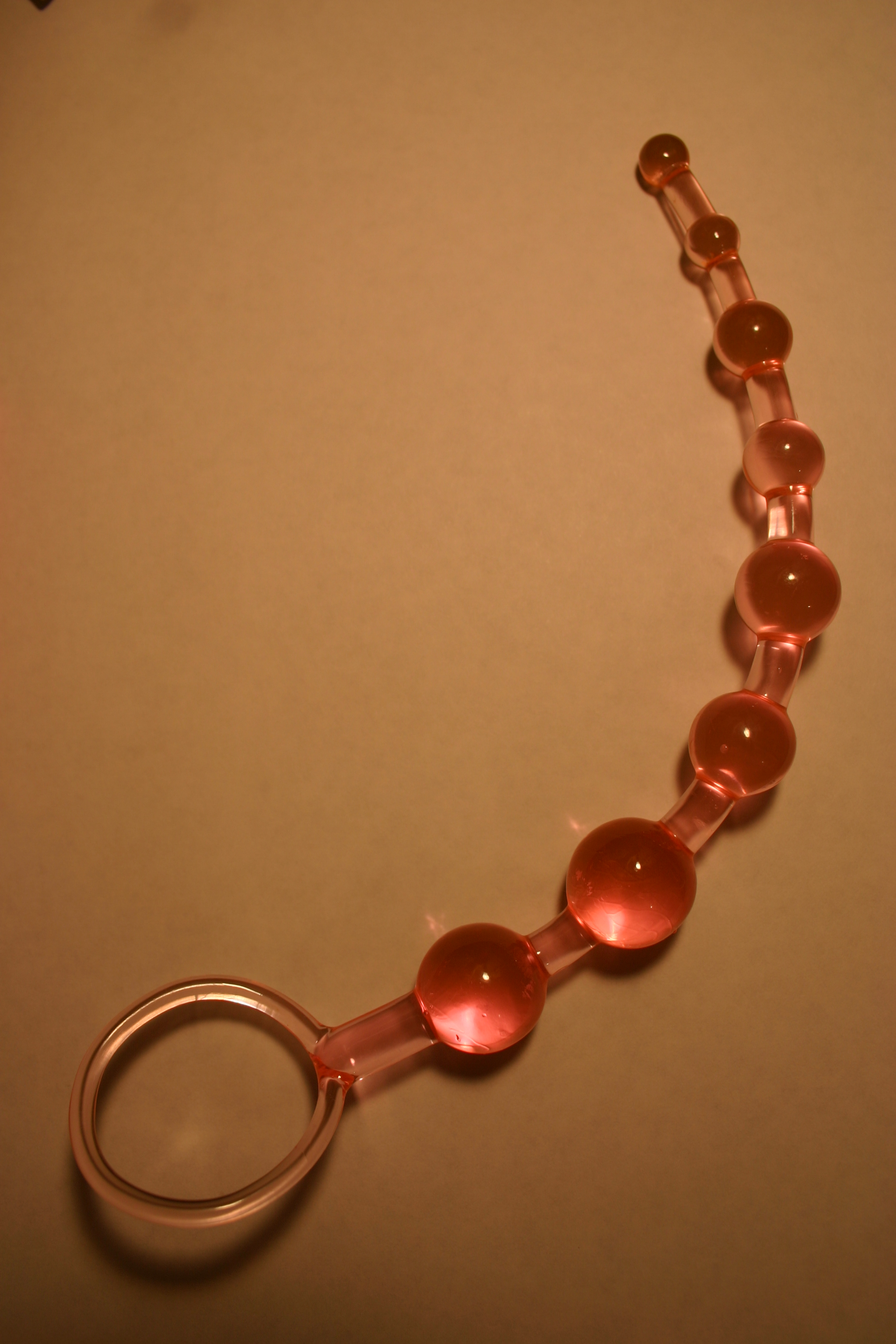
Anal beads

Anal beads are a sex toy consisting of multiple balls attached in series. Individual balls are continuously inserted through the anus into the rectum and then removed with varying speeds depending on the desired effect. The main use of anal beads is for sexual stimulation.

== Design ==
Anal beads are available in many sizes, with individual beads measuring from 25 mm in diameter to 125 mm in diameter or larger. Most users enjoy beads of approximately 45 mm, but those more adventurous or with experience may try larger sizes. Anal beads are commonly made of silicone, plastic, rubber, latex, glass, or metal, and normally end with a ring or similar handle designed for pulling. The purpose of this ring is to prevent the beads from becoming fully lodged in the rectum and to make the toy easier to remove. The beads may either be joined flexibly, requiring individual insertion or by a semi-rigid thin shaft, allowing anal insertion in a single motion.

The many nerve endings of the sphincter provide arousal both during insertion and removal, while larger beads may create a feeling of pressure in the rectum. Removing anal beads at the point of orgasm heightens sensations, leading to a much stronger orgasm.

Some anal beads are enhanced with vibration technology. Certain models by companies like Lovense can be remotely controlled or act as IoT devices.

== Use ==
Anal beads are commonly incorporated during anal sex, worship of the buttocks, genital or anal masturbation, or any activity involving the buttocks, anus, or the anal area.

As with all anal sexual activity, the anal beads and the rectum should be well-lubricated with a sexual lubricant intended for anal sex. It is important to do this, as the rectum can be easily ripped, torn, or injured. Silicone-based lubricants should not be used with silicone anal beads, as the lubricant will erode the beads. Anal sex toys should be well washed with warm soapy water and left to dry naturally after use. Alternatively, they can be placed inside a condom, which is recommended if they are shared with others.

Care must also be taken to count the beads before and after use to ensure that they are all removed from the anus, as strings have reportedly broken during intense rectal movements.

== Safety ==
If the beads are threaded onto a string, which is a porous material, they cannot be fully disinfected. Anal beads should not be shared between users without using a physical barrier, such as a latex or neoprene condom, to prevent the transfer of feces. Sharing unsterilized anal toys can expose users to various sexually transmitted diseases. Anal beads that have been inserted into an anus should not be inserted into a vagina, as this causes yeast infections and bacterial vaginosis, as well as various sexually transmitted diseases.

== See also ==
- Anal masturbation
- Anal vibrator
- Ben Wa balls
- Butt plug
- Pegging
- Prostate massager
