= Debby Herbenick =

Human sexuality expert

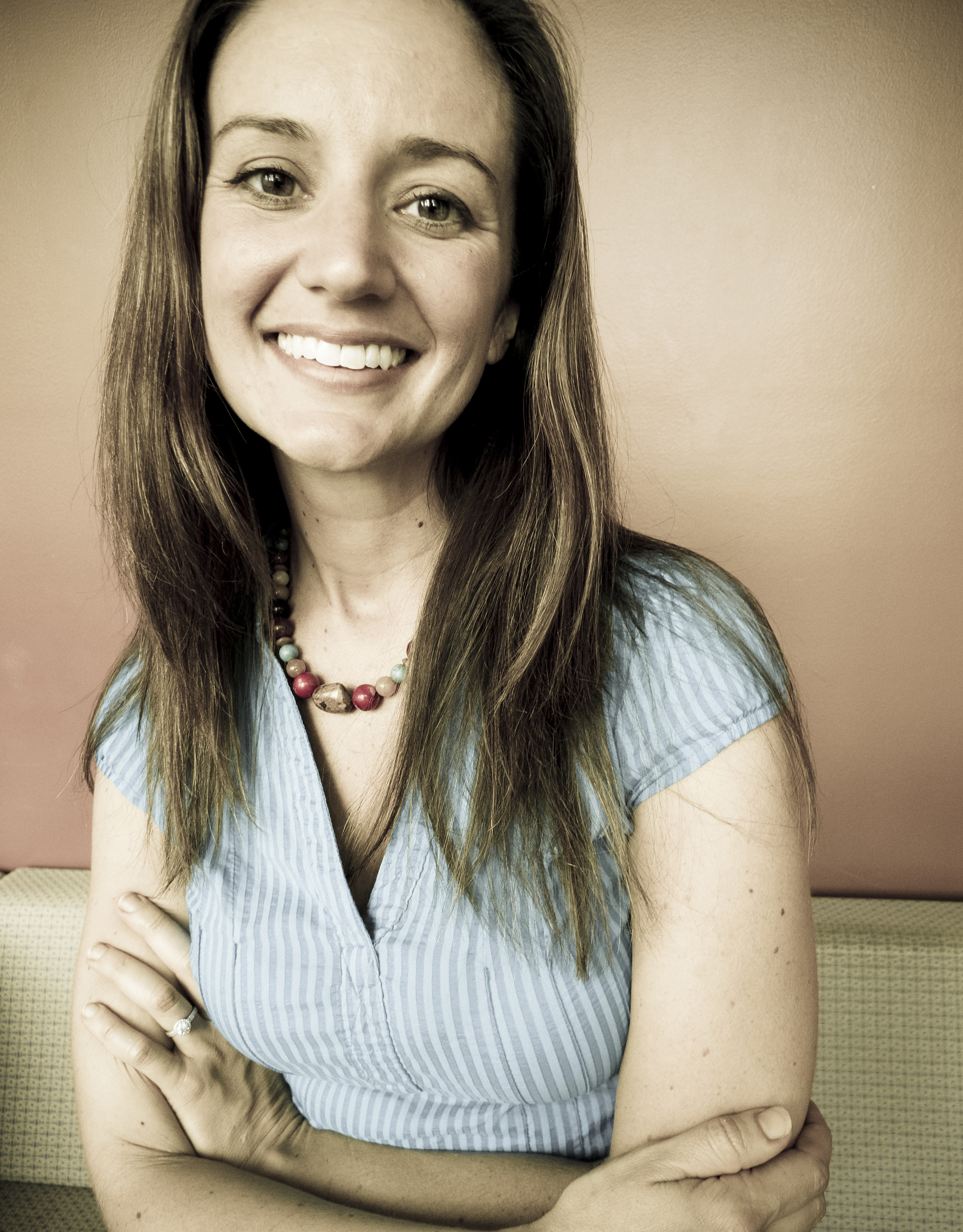
- Education: University of Maryland, College Park (BA); Indiana University (PhD)
- Occupations: Author, research scientist, educator, blogger, sex advice columnist, professor and human sexuality expert in media, Director of the Center for Sexual Health Promotion in the School of Public Health-Bloomington at Indiana University

Debby Herbenick (/hɜːrˈbɛnɪk/ her-BEN-ik) is an American author, research scientist, sex educator, sex advice columnist, children's book author, blogger, television personality, professor, and human sexuality expert in the media. Herbenick is a Provost Professor at the Indiana University School of Public Health (IUSPH) and lead investigator of the National Survey of Sexual Health and Behavior (NSSHB), which Time called "the most comprehensive survey of its kind in nearly two decades."

Herbenick is a recent past-president of the International Academy of Sex Research and previously served as president of the American Association of Sexuality Educators, Counselors, and Therapists (AASECT) from 2016 to 2018. She is also an AASECT-certified sexuality educator. She is a recipient of the IU SPH 2021 Outstanding Senior Researcher Award, Indiana University's 2018 Outstanding Faculty Collaborative Research Award, and the 2020 AASECT Professional Standard of Excellence Award. Herbenick was honored in 2018 as a Fellow of the Society for the Scientific Study of Sexuality and in 2021 as one of the University of Minnesota's 50 Distinguished Sexual and Gender Revolutionaries. Additionally, she is co-producer on the Emmy-nominated documentary Hot Girls Wanted.

== Research ==
Herbenick has published more than 240 scientific papers in peer-reviewed journals and is one of the leading experts on the study of sexual behavior in the United States. She has been described in the New York Times as "one of the foremost researchers on American sexual behavior" and on CNN as "one of the country's most credible sources of accurate scientific information when it comes to sexuality."

Dr. Herbenick has published research related to population-level trends in sexual behavior, sexual consent, vulvar health, genital self-image, women's and men's sexual behavior, - exercise-induced orgasm (also known as the coregasm), condoms, lubricants, and sexual enhancement products. Herbenick has spoken on these and other sexuality and relationship topics at a number of colleges, universities, and national and international conferences. She regularly teaches research and human sexuality classes at Indiana University. In a recent interview with Dr. Herbenick, she reported on a large influx of a dangerous sexual trend known as choking.

Herbenick leads the National Survey of Sexual Health and Behavior, an award-winning U.S. nationally representative probability study of sex in the United States, with multiple waves conducted from 2009 to the present day. She is the Director of the Center for Sexual Health Promotion in the School of Public Health-Bloomington at Indiana University in Bloomington.

== Books ==
Herbenick has authored or co-authored several books. These include Because It Feels Good: A Woman’s Guide to Sexual Pleasure and Satisfaction, The I Love You More Book (a book about love for children and grown ups), Read My Lips: A Complete Guide to the Vagina and Vulva, Great in Bed, Sex Made Easy: Your Awkward Questions Answered for Better, Smarter, Safer Sex, and The Coregasm Workout . Her most recent book is Yes Your Kid: What Parents Need to Know About Today's Teens and Sex.

== Magazines, television, and other media ==
Herbenick frequently addresses sexuality research in the media for publications such as The New York Times, The Atlantic, The Washington Post, among other magazines and newspapers. From 2005 through 2012, Herbenick wrote a weekly sex advice column for Time Out Chicago and, for more than a decade (starting in 2003), wrote sex columns and blogs for Men's Health magazine. Also, Herbenick appeared as an expert in relationships and human sexuality on the Tamron Hall Show, Tiffany Cross' The Cross Connection, The Today Show, Katie Couric's television show Katie, on various PBS specials, on The Tyra Banks Show and on The Doctors, and on one occasion taught about the vulva by using a vulva puppet on Tyra. This clip resulted in millions of views on YouTube and also aired on The Soup and Best Week Ever. Herbenick, her colleague, and their research have also been profiled on an episode of the Discovery Channel's Curiosity. In 2013, Herbenick launched a successful Kickstarter project to create a poster and postcard series called "What do you like about your vagina and vulva?" Additionally, from 2001 to 2018 she wrote the newspaper columns and hosted the audio podcasts of Kinsey Confidential for the Kinsey Institute.

The blog MySexProfessor.com was run by Herbenick from 2007 to 2014 and featured science-based information about sexuality. She is the founder of the Bloomington Sex Salon, an endowed event series in Bloomington, Indiana, and the Make Sex Normal project, which she launched with a highly viewed TEDx talk in 2013.
