= National Survey of Sexual Health and Behavior =

U.S. study of human sexual behavior

The National Survey of Sexual Health and Behavior is a decade-long nationally representative study of human sexual behavior. The research has been conducted in the United States by researchers from the Center for Sexual Health Promotion in the School of Public Health at Indiana University in Bloomington. Time magazine called the NSSHB "the most comprehensive survey of its kind in nearly two decades and the first to include teenagers." Former U.S. Surgeon General Dr. Joycelyn Elders has written the following about NSSHB findings: "These data are important for keeping the nation moving forward in the area of sexual health and well being. In the absence of scientific data available to construct an accurate and up-to-date view, opinions in the field of sexual science can vary widely from person to person."

There have been a total of seven waves of the NSSHB, all conducted between 2009 and 2018. More than 30 scientific articles have been published from these data. Articles based on the first wave of the study, the 2009 NSSHB, were initially released in a supplement to the October 2010 issue of Journal of Sexual Medicine. Since the NSSHB's inception in 2009, there have been a total of six additional waves of data collection. The NSSHB was the first U.S. nationally representative probability survey of sexual behavior in the United States conducted since the 1992 National Health and Social Life Survey. In Fall 2018, the researchers were honored with Indiana University's Outstanding Faculty Collaborative Research Award Lecture.

The 2009 NSSHB surveyed nearly 6,000 individuals between the age of 14 and 94, living in the United States. Findings showed a wide variety of sexual behavior. According to one of the lead investigators, Debby Herbenick, PhD, of Indiana University in Bloomington, "Adult men and women rarely engage in just one sex act when they have sex." In addition to Dr. Herbenick, the original core NSSHB team included Drs. Michael Reece, J. Dennis Fortenberry, Brian Dodge, Stephanie Sanders, and Vanessa Schick. Significant findings include use of condoms in about 25% of instances of vaginal sex by adults, about 33% if they were single, with teenagers using condoms 70 to 80% of the time. Only a low level of sexual activity among the approximately 800 teenagers surveyed was found with incidence increasing with age. It was discovered that about one third of women reported pain during intercourse. A discrepancy was discovered between men's perception that their female partner had experienced orgasm, about 85%, and women's self-reporting of 64%.

The NSSHB has been supported by funding from Church and Dwight, maker of Trojan condoms. The sponsor offered limited input on the survey development, mostly with respect to gathering information on how often Americans use condoms, settling with a formulation which requested information on whether condoms were used or not during the last 10 sexual encounters of each respondent.

With respect to condom use results were encouraging especially with respect to teenagers. Ethnic populations impacted by HIV/AIDS showed a higher rate of condom use than then general population as did dating adults. Discrepancies remain between the level of condom use considered optimal for public health and reported rate of use particularly by people over 40.

Women reported less satisfaction with sexual activity than men with less pleasure, less arousal, and fewer orgasms. This was hypothesized by one of the researchers as being related to the greater incidence of pain also reported by women.

In the 2012 NSSHB, researchers found that pain during vaginal intercourse was reported by 30% of women and 7% of men. Additionally, pain during anal intercourse was reported by 72% of women and 15% of men.

In a publication from the 2016, the researchers found that although most sexually active adults between ages 18 and 50 were aware that Zika could be transmitted by mosquitos, only about 40% identified sexual intercourse as a possible route of transmission.

In a 2018 NSSHB publication, it was found that about 60% of Americans who reported on a recent sexual event reported having ejaculated somewhere outside of the vagina at least once. Looking at the most recent sexual event, findings showed a lack of concordance between the percentage of people indicating they used "withdrawal" at their most recent sexual event compared with where they said they ejaculated.
