= Gingering =

For horses

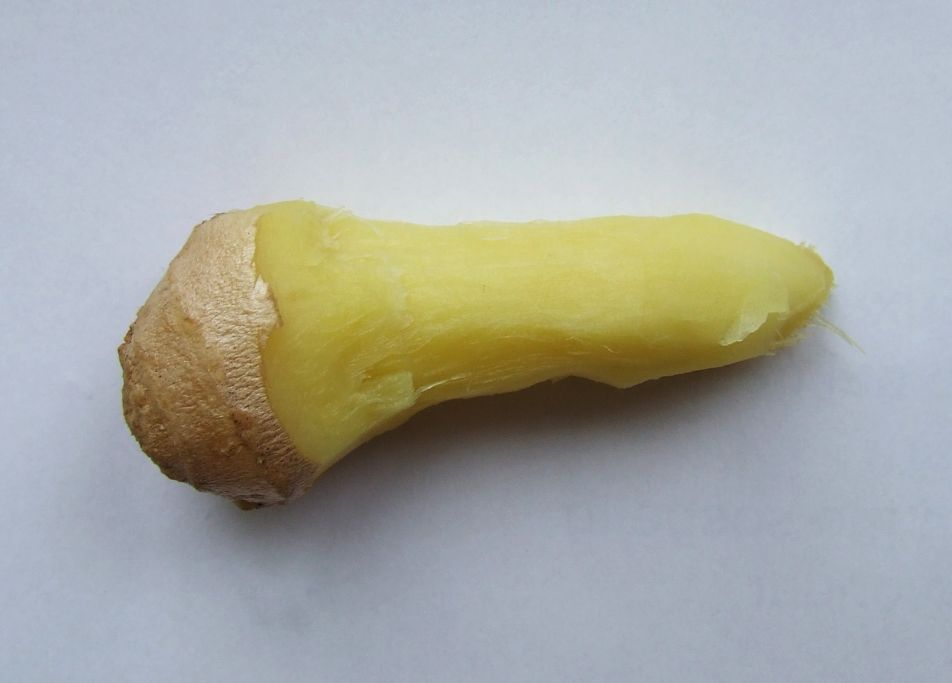
Pared finger of ginger root

Gingering, or gingering the tail, is the practice of making a horse carry its tail high, and to a lesser extent to encourage it to move in a lively fashion, by applying an irritant, such as raw ginger, to its anus or vagina. Historically, the process, the purpose of which was often to make an older horse behave like one that was younger or to liven up a sick or weakened animal temporarily, was known as feaguing (from which the modern term figging derives), and involved a piece of ginger, onion, pepper or tobacco. Francis Grose added in his Classical Dictionary of the Vulgar Tongue (1796) "and formerly, as it is said, a live eel", but that is very unlikely. The modern practice commonly involves a paste product with concentrated gingerol.

For the halter horses in the Arabian and American Saddlebred breeds, high tail carriage and animation are desired traits. However, nearly all horse show sanctioning organizations in the U.S. explicitly forbid gingering and can disqualify a horse treated in this way. While some areas may be less than rigorous about enforcing the rule, tests such as "ginger swabbing" may be done to detect the presence of ginger in the anus. While it is not entirely reliable, concerns about being detected by anal tests have led to some horse handlers placing the irritant in the vagina if the horse is a mare. A modern veterinary dictionary notes that vaginal placement is more effective than anal insertion because the irritant is likely to remain in place longer. It concludes gingering "would be considered to be an act of cruelty in any civilized community".

== See also ==
- Animal abuse
- Soring
