= Michael Scarce =

American activist

- Occupations: writer, health advocate, activist

Michael Scarce is a writer, researcher, activist and gay men's health advocate. He lives in San Francisco. He is the author of two books: Smearing the Queer: Medical Bias in the Health Care of Gay Men and Male on Male Rape: The Hidden Toll of Stigma and Shame.

He was the first man to graduate with a degree in Women's Studies from Ohio State University, where his activism led to the evacuation of a wing of a campus residence hall after experiencing death threats and ongoing anti-gay harassment. Along with Marc Conte, he was one of two undergraduate students simultaneously selected as the first openly gay members of Ohio State University's Homecoming Court.

He also received a Master's Degree from OSU in Comparative Studies of Science and Technology, otherwise known as science studies. The field of science studies is an interdisciplinary research area that seeks to situate scientific expertise in a broad social, historical, and philosophical context. It is concerned with the history of scientific disciplines, the interrelationships between science and society, and the alleged covert purposes that underlie scientific claims. While it is critical of science, it holds out the possibility of broader public participation in science policy issues.

Scarce was hired as the Coordinator of OSU's Rape Education and Prevention Program, now known as Sexual Violence Education. In 1998, he was the first Coordinator of the University of California's Lesbian, Gay, Bisexual and Transgender Resources.

In 1999, he authored a controversial article for POZ magazine on the phenomenon of barebacking among gay men, which won the Randy Shilts Award for Excellence in Writing. He continued working with POZ as a columnist and Contributing Editor.

== Bibliography ==
- Male on Male Rape: The Hidden Toll of Stigma and Shame, Perseus Books (1997).
- Smearing the Queer: Medical Bias in the Health Care of Gay Men, Haworth Press (1999).
