= Figging =

Type of corporal punishment

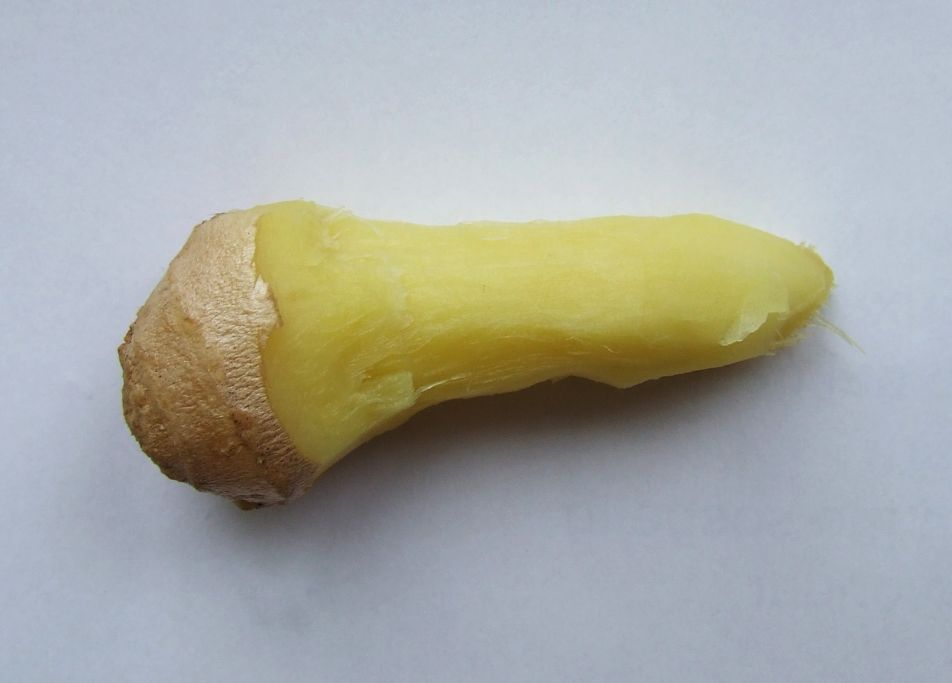
Pared finger of ginger root

Figging is the practice of inserting a piece of skinned ginger root into the human anus in order to generate an acute burning sensation. Historically this was possibly a method of punishment, and it has since been adopted as a practice of BDSM. The term "figging" comes from the 19th-century word "feaguing."

== History ==
A similar method of physical punishment was first used as a form of discipline on slaves in Ancient Greece termed rhaphanidosis. The detainee was restrained to varying degrees in order to restrict mobility while the sensation grew from uncomfortable to extreme.

== Method ==
The ginger, which is skinned and often carved into the shape of a butt plug, can causes an intense burning sensation. It takes time for the effect to begin, after which it builds steadily and lasts for approximately twenty minutes before diminishing rapidly. It is worth noting that some people only have a mild discomfort, but not actual pain. For maximal effect, it is suggested to not use lube (which can diminish the effect) and to peel it fresh before use. The ginger, after use, can be further skinned and used to extend the experience, or fresh ginger may be used; each application of ginger root refreshes the duration of the sensations in the subject.

If the person being figged tightens the muscles of the anus, the sensation becomes more intense. For this reason it is sometimes used in caning to penalize clenching of the buttocks. The subject must choose between bracing for the strike, at the consequence of increased burning sensation, or relaxing the buttocks and taking the full force of the blow.

== See also ==
- Gingering, in horses
- Glossary of BDSM
- Rhaphanidosis
- Soring
