= Klismaphilia =

Enjoyment of, and sexual arousal from, enemas

Klismaphilia (or klysmaphilia), from the Greek words κλύσμα ("enema", from κατακλυσμός, "deluge, flood") and φιλία ("love"), is a paraphilia involving enjoyment of, and sexual arousal from, enemas.

== History ==
The term klismaphilia was coined in 1973 by Joanne Denko, an early investigator in this field, in her article "Klismaphilia: Enema as a Sexual Preference: Report of Two Cases," to describe the activities of some of her patients, whom she referred to as klismaphiliacs.

== Manifestation ==
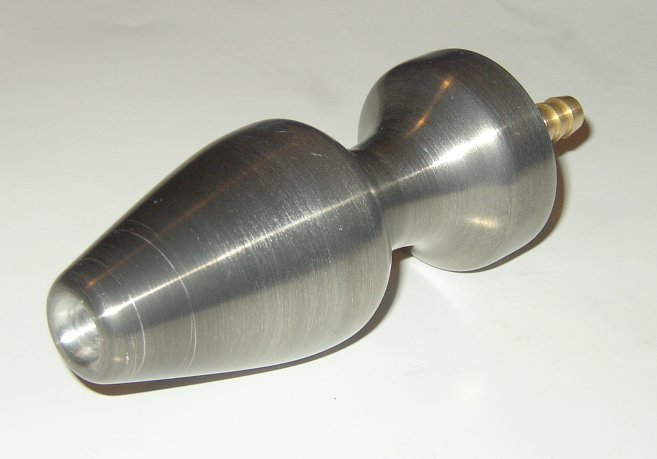
An aluminum nozzle

An Inflatable Enema Nozzle

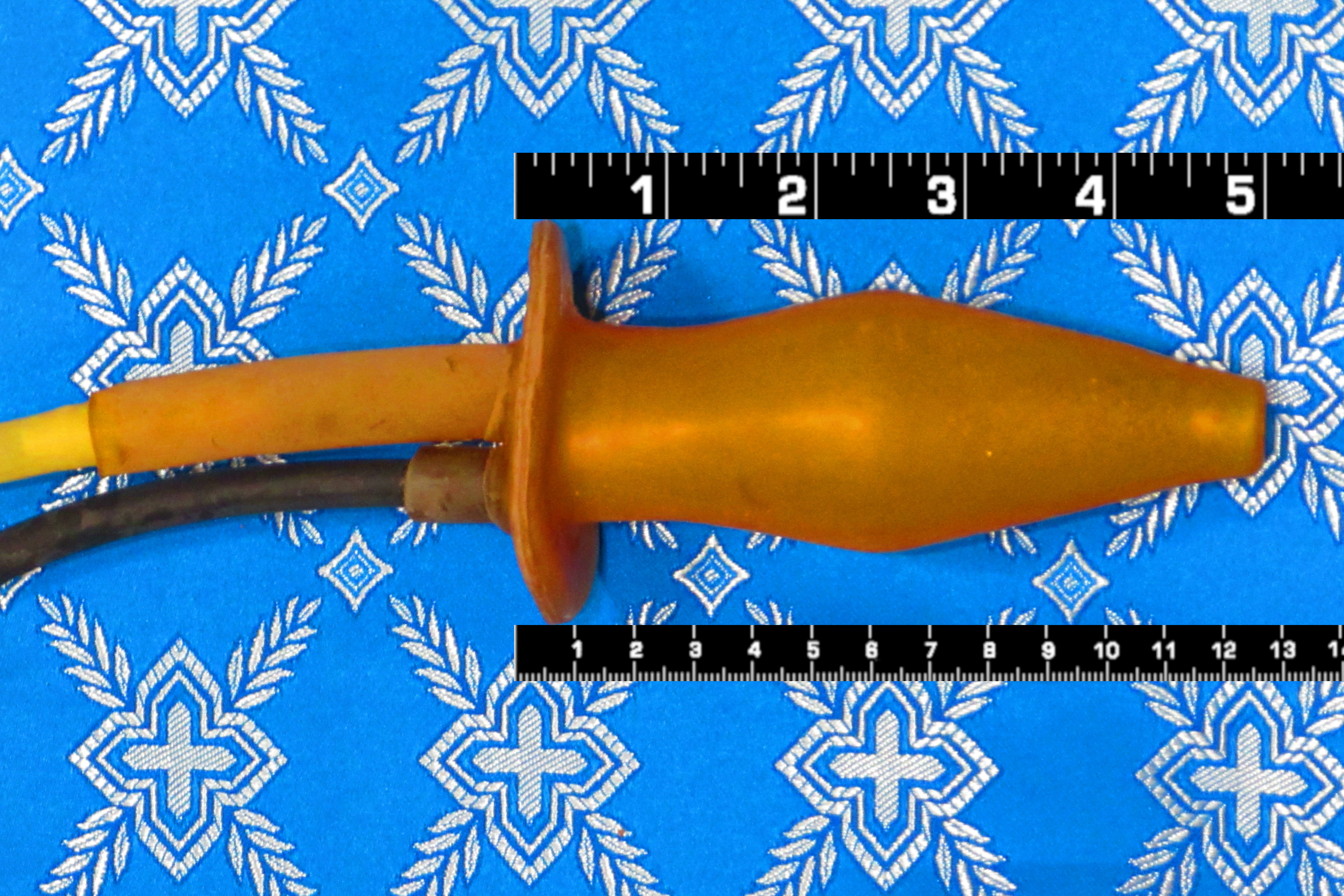
As inserted into the rectum

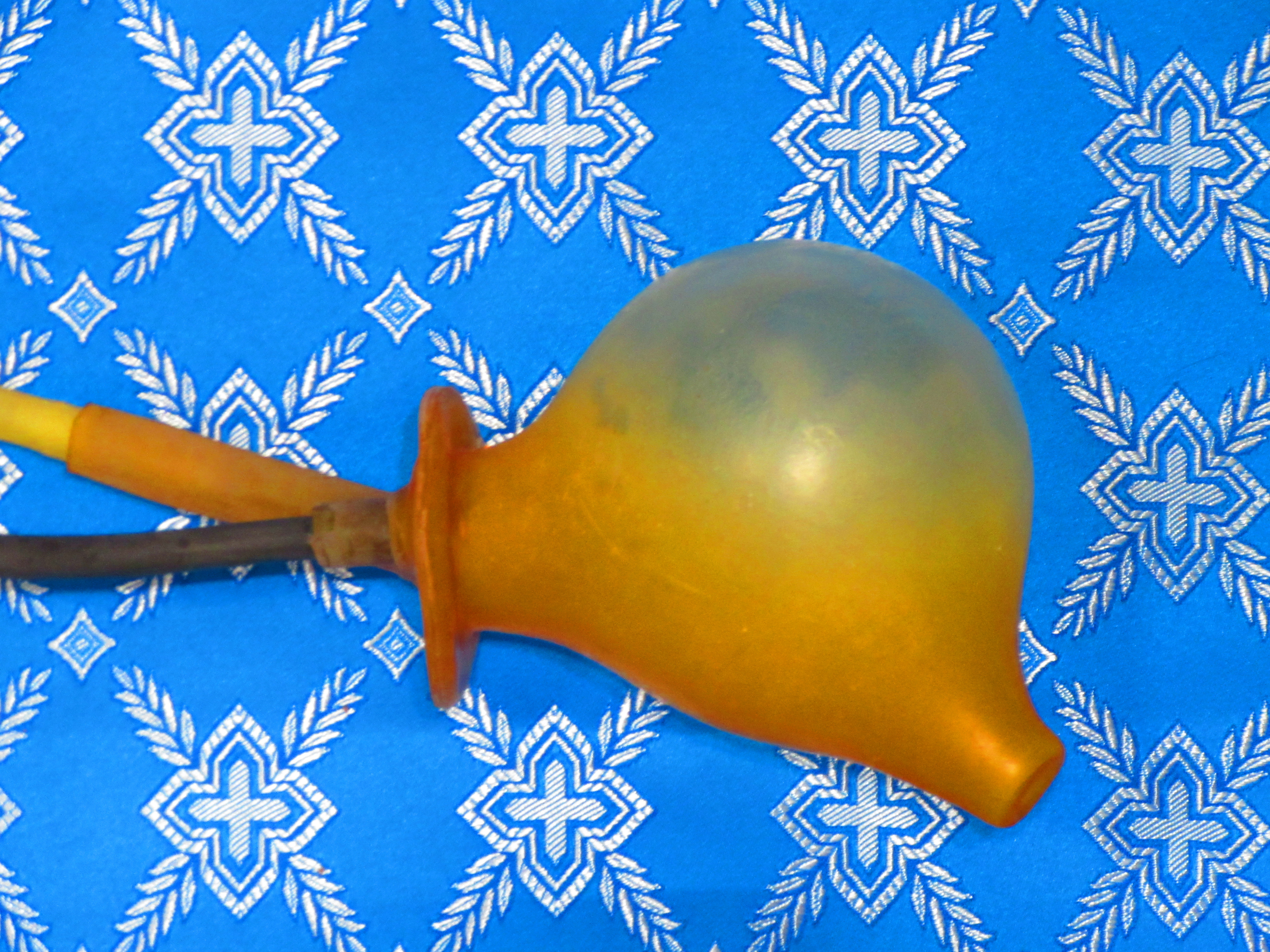
Inflated wider than a human rectum so it cannot be expelled (diameter here of 89 millimetres (3.5 in))

Klismaphiles may be sexually aroused by the preparations, such as by the feel and smell of a latex rubber or plastic syringe, by the smell of soapsuds enema solution, or by preparing the recipient. Often, klismaphiles report discovering these desires after a chance administration of an enema sometime in their childhood, but some do report discovering these feelings later on. Klismaphiles can gain satisfaction of enemas through fantasies, by actually receiving or giving one, or through the process of eliminating steps to being administered one (e.g., under the pretense of being constipated).

An enema can be an auxiliary to, or a substitute for, genital sexual activity. Enemas can induce sexual arousal the bulbospongiosus muscle which starts in front of the anus contributes, in women, to clitoral erection and the contractions of orgasm, and in males, to erection, the contractions of orgasm, and ejaculation. Also, sexual sensation results from distention of the rectum as it is filled and dilated which, in women, puts pressure on the back of the vagina, and in men stimulates the prostate and seminal vesicles. Furthermore, contractions of muscles throughout the abdomen caused by expulsion of an enema can stimulate, in women, the uterus and vagina, and in men, the prostate, seminal vesicle, and internal penis.

That some women use enemas while masturbating was documented by Alfred Kinsey in Sexual Behavior in the Human Female: "There were still other masturbatory techniques which were regularly or occasionally employed by some 11 percent of the females in the sample... Douches, streams of running water, vibrators, urethral insertions, enemas, other anal insertions, sado-masochistic activity, and still other methods were occasionally employed, but none of them in any appreciable number of cases."

Sadomasochistic activities may incorporate enemas.BDSM punishment scenes can involve administering an enema in a manner that is humiliating and painful and for producing pain and cramps an extra-large volumes or highly irritating substances can be injected.

== Classification ==
The Diagnostic and Statistical Manual of Mental Disorders (DSM-IV-TR) classifies klismaphilia under the diagnosis of "Paraphilias, Not Otherwise Specified". The diagnostic code is 302.9. Proactive treatment for klismaphilics is not generally recommended, due to the lack of any significant desire to be "cured". Health treatment for klismaphilia thus is typically only focused on ensuring the techniques employed and chemicals used are not harmful to the practitioner. Caution should always be maintained on the part of the practitioners experimenting with new techniques and concoctions; in certain cases cramps produced by the chemicals used have led to hospitalizations, in other circumstances the effects can even be life-threatening.

== Sources ==
- Agnew, J. (2000). "Klismaphilia". Venereology. 13 (2): 75–79. ISSN 1032-1012.
