= Against Stephanos =

Orations delivered by Apollodoros of Acharnae

The speeches "Against Stephanos" (Ancient Greek: κατὰ Στεφάνου Ψευδομαρτυριῶν, romanized: kata Stephanou Pseudomartyrion, "Against Stephanos for bearing false witness") were two orations surviving in the Demosthenic corpus, and delivered by Apollodoros of Acharnae. The second speech against Stephanos, preserved as Demosthenes' 46th, was certainly not composed by Demosthenes, but the authorship of the first speech is disputed. The speeches are part of a dispute between Apollodoros and his stepfather Phormion.

== Authorship ==
The second speech was not composed by Demosthenes, but by the same author of five of Apollodoros' other speeches preserved among Demosthenes' speeches. Most modern scholars consider that Apollodoros himself was the likely author of these speeches.

The first, however, stylistically resembles other authentic speeches of Demosthenes more than it does the remainder of Apollodoros' speeches. On these grounds, some scholars such as Jeremy Trevett argue that it is authentic. Douglas MacDowell, however, disputes this, arguing that it is unlikely that Demosthenes, who composed "For Phormion" against Apollodoros, would have been asked by him to compose a speech against Stephanos in the same dispute. Therefore, MacDowell suggests that it too was written by Apollodoros. Finally, it has been suggested that the first speech Against Stephanos was composed by neither Demosthenes nor Apollodoros, but a third orator. Hypereides, for instance, has been put forward as a possible author.

Konstantinos Kapparis believes that Demosthenes wrote the first of the two speeches Against Stephanos, and suggests that he was specifically chosen by Apollodoros because of his success with "For Phormion". He suggests that Demosthenes agreed to write the speech because the two men were at the time politically aligned over what was to be done with the theoric fund.

== Background ==
In 370/69 BC, the banker Pasion died leaving two sons: Apollodoros, the litigant in these speeches, and Pasicles. In his will, he arranged for Phormion to become one of the guardians of his younger son Pasicles. The guardians of Pasicles also took on the responsibility for managing Pasion's property, which was to be split between his sons when Pasicles came of age. Some time around 350/49 BC, Apollodoros brought a suit against Phormion claiming that he still owed Apollodoros 20 talents from Pasion's estate. Apollodoros lost this case, and so brought another suit, this time against Stephanos, one of the witnesses who had testified against him as part of Phormion's case.

== Case against Stephanos ==
Apollodoros accused Stephanos of making a false testimony in the lawsuit between himself and Phormion. He brought the case to court soon after the end of the suit against Phormion, and so the speeches against Stephanos probably date to 350/49 BC.

The first speech begins with a complicated argument on probability, which MacDowell doubts the jury would have been able to follow. Apollodoros then proceeds to attack the character of first Stephanos and then Phormion. The second speech, according to MacDowell, "concentrates more closely on what is really the only substantial point in his accusation".

The case made by Apollodoros against Stephanos in the two speeches has been judged unconvincing by modern commentators. According to MacDowell, Apollodoros fails to demonstrate that Stephanos was guilty of giving false testimony.

== See also ==
- Against Neaera
- Pseudo-Demosthenes
