= Pallake =

Concubine in ancient Greece

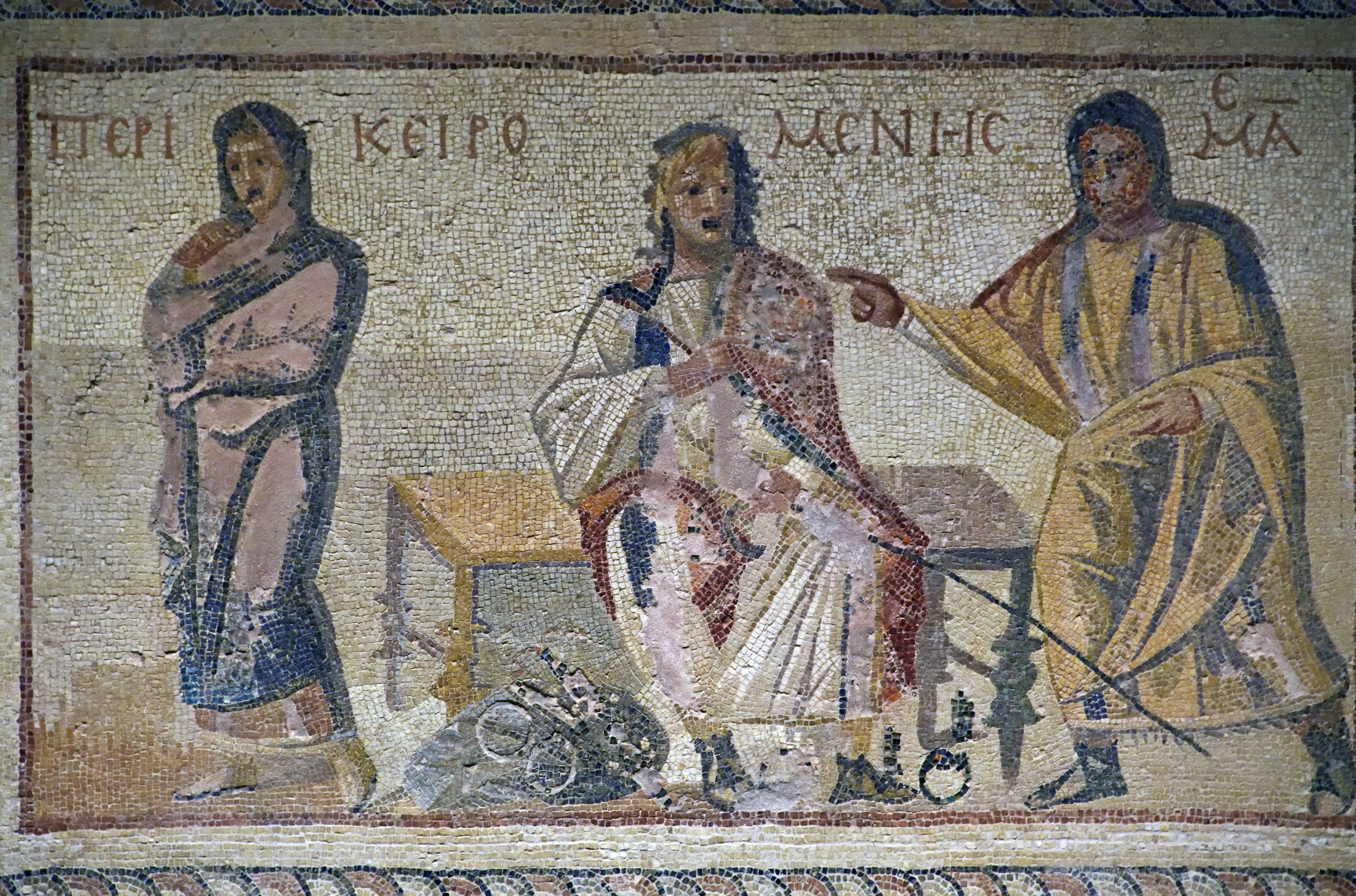
Mosaic from Antioch depicting a scene from the play Perikeiromene. The woman to the left is identified as Glykera, the pallake of the man in the middle, Polemon. The man to the right is a household slave, Sosias.

Pallakai (Ancient Greek: παλλακαί; singular pallake (παλλακή)) was the general name given to concubines in ancient Greece.

== Etymology ==
The word pallake, "concubine," is of uncertain etymology. R. S. P. Beekes has suggested a Pre-Greek origin and a connection with Latin paelex, "mistress," which is also a loanword from a non-Indo-European Mediterranean language.

== Status ==
Pallakai could be either free or slaves. A free pallake was often a former hetaira, a freedwoman, or a woman from a poor family; and almost always a foreigner, not a member of the polis in which she lived. An enslaved pallake would usually have been a captive of war. These women were allowed to be bought or sold just as any other slave in the Greek world. In Aeschylus' Agamemnon, Cassandra plays the role of an enslaved pallake, captured at Troy and brought home to Agamemnon's palace as his mistress, where they both are killed by Clytemnestra.

Pallakai were accepted as part of Greek society. In "Against Neaera" the orator says:

We have hetairai [educated companions] for pleasure, pallakai [concubines] for the body's daily needs, and gynaekes [wives] for the bearing of legitimate children and for the guardianship of our houses.

== Literature ==
There are many examples of pallakai in literature and drama.

The most lengthy is the "Against Neaera" speech, in which a woman called Neaera and her husband are prosecuted for claiming citizen rights falsely for her and the children she bore to her husband. This was considered a very serious crime, especially in Athens, where citizenship was restricted to those with a citizen mother and father. The case made against her alleges that she was a pallake in Corinth and other cities before she came to Athens. The defense speech, however, does not survive, but one such possible defense may have been that she was a mistress rather than a prostitute, which was a normal social practice.

Another such example occurs in Antiphon's speech "Against the Stepmother for Poisoning." In this speech for the prosecution, it is alleged that a woman persuaded a pallake to poison her husband.

== See also ==
- Sexual slavery
- Women in Classical Athens
