= Xenokleides =

Xenokleides was an Athenian poet of the 4th century BC. None of his works have survived. He was one of the hetaera Neaira's lovers. According to Apollodorus of Acharnae, 369 BC, he spoke out against Callistratus's request to support Sparta over Thebes. He was prosecuted for avoiding military service, though as a tax-collector for the year he was exempt from military duties, convicted, and disenfranchised (Ancient Greek: ἀτιμία, atimia). This prosecution, brought by one Stephanos on behalf of Callistratus, was probably intended to remove Xenokleides as a political opponent. In 343, Xenokleides was living in Macedonia, and was banished by Philip II; he appears to have been once again living in Athens by the time the speech Against Neaira was delivered.
