= Gnathaena =

Athenian hetaira

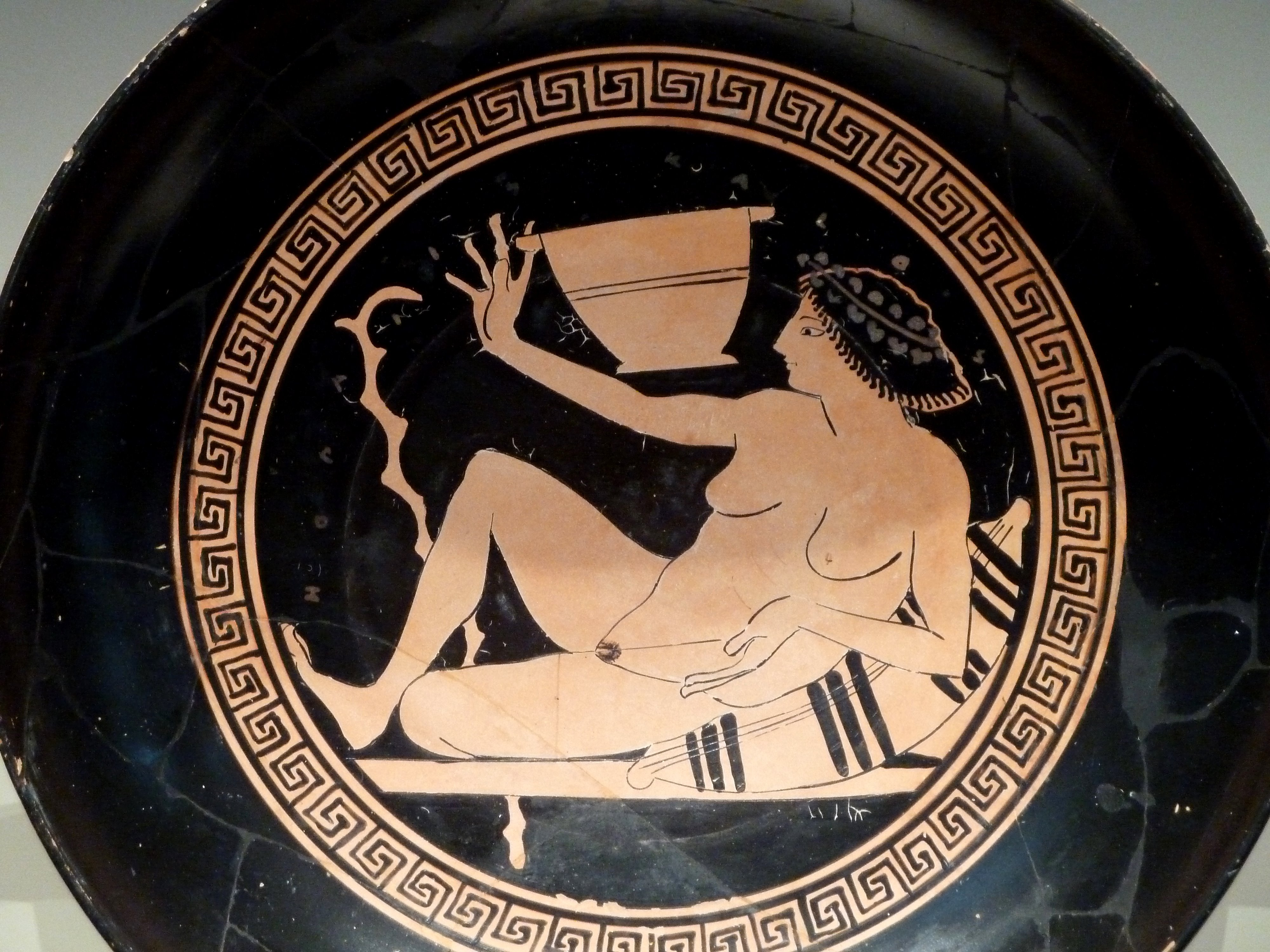
This painting, on the inside of a kylix, depicts a hetaira playing kottabos, a drinking game played at symposia in which the participants flicked the dregs of their wine at a target.

Gnathaena (Ancient Greek: Γνάθαινα) was an Athenian hetaira (plural: hetairai), a class of ancient Greek prostitutes who were companions to wealthy men. Though there is no source for either her date of birth or date of death, Gnathaena is known to have lived during the 4th century BCE due to her affiliations with various men of the era. Her most notable lover was Diphilus, an Athenian New Comedy playwright. According to Athenaeus, Gnathaena was famous for her lavish parties and witty repartee, and even wrote a treatise on proper conduct at her symposiums entitled, "Rules for Dining in Company".

== Life as a hetaira ==
Gnathaena was one of many fourth-century women in the class of prostitutes known as a hetaira, or "companion". The hetairai were a class of courtesans in ancient Greece that were distinct from pornai, another type of prostitute, as hetairai were thought to be women who consorted exclusively in aristocratic circles and with only a few men as opposed to selling sexual acts through a brothel as pornai did. Hetairai were not paid according to what sexual acts they performed with their patrons; instead, they were paid for their companionship over a long period of time. They also provided intellectual stimulation in addition to sexual pleasure and were thought to be well-educated in some circumstances. However, this definition of what hetairai did is contested by the Oxford Classical Dictionary (second edition) as well as by the lawyer Apollodorus in his prosecution speech "Against Neaera". Both of these sources maintain that hetairai were grouped in with pornai as general prostitutes.

Gnathaena and other hetairai were traditionally a part of the symposium, a banquet of aristocratic men that involved drinking, dancing, and music as well as consorting with hetairai. The symposium was an integral part of the social life of respected men. Being a part of the hetairai class afforded Gnathaena the luxury of becoming highly educated, controlling her own finances, and additionally hosting banquets and symposiums of her own that were attended by the wealthy men with whom she consorted. These opportunities were not a substantial part of the ancient Athenian woman's life or social expectations at the time. Women of Athens traditionally had a limited ability to hold land or participate in their own financial decisions, and were not particularly involved socially in the way that men were, past some religious festivals such as the Thesmophoria. Gnathaena both attended and hosted symposiums, using her popularity to invite upper-class men to dine and to match wits with her. She eventually wrote a code of conduct for proper manners at these symposiums called "Rules for Dining in Company" that describes the rules for dining at her table. Some scholars believe that this is a testament to how well-respected she was in her time and an indication of the higher status afforded to hetaira, as Gnathaena made the rules for her own household and was not beholden to a man in the way that most Athenian women were. Gnathaena's treatise was a collection of rules stating which men were allowed to enter into her and her daughters' house to be a part of the symposiums they hosted, as well as how the men should conduct themselves once they were participating. Athenaeus describes Gnathaena's treatise as follows:

Gnathaena... even compiled a code of laws for banquets, according to which lovers were to be admitted to her and to her daughters, in imitation of the philosophers, who had drawn up similar documents. And Callimachus has recorded this code of hers in the third Catalogue of Laws which he has given; and he has quoted the first words of it as follows:- "This law has been compiled, being fair and equitable; and it is written in three hundred and twenty-three verses."

Gnathaena is described extensively by Athenaeus as being "very witty and prompt in repartee" and having multiple lovers (some named, some unnamed) to whom she provided both intellectual and emotional companionship as well as sexual relations. Being a hetaira, Gnathaena often verbally sparred or competed intellectually with her lovers using wordplay or insults. Athenaeus gives examples of a few of what he considers to be her wittiest phrases in his work Deipnosophistae:

Once, when a man came to see her, and saw some eggs on a dish, and said, "Are these raw, Gnathaena, or boiled?" "They are made of brass, my boy," said she. On one occasion, when Chaerephon came to sup with her without an invitation, Gnathaena pledged him in a cup of wine. "Take it," said she, "you proud fellow." And he said, "I proud?" "Who can be more so," said she, "when you come without even being invited?" [...] On one occasion, some men were drinking in her house, and were eating some lentils dressed with onions (βολβοφάκη); as the maidservant was clearing the table, and putting some of the lentils in her bosom (κόλπον), Gnathaena said, "She is thinking of making some bosom-lentils (κολποφάκη)."

== Lovers and family ==
One of the most notable of Gnathaena's consorts was Diphilus, an Athenian comedic playwright who wrote around 100 plays in the style of New Comedy. Athenaeus cites Machon as his evidence for Diphilus' and Gnathaena's relationship and extensively chronicles his own musings on the subject. According to Athenaeus, Gnathaena often made fun of Diphilus and his plays, though he is described as "a man above her other lovers beloved by her". Though Diphilus was possibly her favorite lover, Athenaeus also mentions unnamed others and alludes to many more.

During the course of her life, Gnathaena had multiple daughters (unnamed) who helped their mother host parties and entertain guests. One of Gnathaena's daughters also had a daughter named Gnathaeniŏn. Athenaeus alludes to Gnathaena's daughters and granddaughter also being courtesans known for witty remarks as Gnathaena was before them. Gnathaeniŏn had a son with Andronicus, a "tragic actor".

== See also ==
- Prostitution in ancient Greece
- Neaira (Neaera), another famous courtesan
