= Polycles =

Polycles, an ancient Greek name, may refer to:

- Polycles (370 BC), sculptor who flourished about the 102nd Olympiad (370 BC), mentioned in Pliny's Natural History
- Polycles of Sparta, owner of the horses that won the tethrippon chariot race in the Olympic Games in 440 BC
- Polycles of Cyrene, Olympic Games winner of the stadion race in 348 BC
- Polycles (155 BC), sculptor flourished about the 156th Olympiad (155 BC), mentioned in Pliny's Natural History

== See also ==
- Against Polycles, a judicial oration by Pseudo-Demosthenes (384–322 BCE)
