= Timanoridas =

Timanoridas may refer to:

- Timanoridas of Corinth, purchaser of Neaira
- Timanoridas, an ancient Macedonian
