= Phormio (disambiguation) =

Phormio or Phormion may refer to: (in date order)

- Phormio, an Athenian general during the Peloponnesian War, victorious in 428 BC
- Phormion, a student of Plato who was sent to ancient Elis
- For Phormion, a legal speech by Demosthenes delivered 350–49 BC on behalf of a freed slave of that name involved in a banking dispute
- Against Phormio, a private oration by Demosthenes delivered in c335 BC in a claim brought by Chrysippus against a different Phormio about liability for goods lost at sea.
- Phormio (play), a comedy by the Roman writer Terentius (Terence), first performed 161 BC
