= For Phormion =

Speech composed by Demosthenes

"For Phormion" (Ancient Greek: Παραγραφὴ ὑπὲρ Φορμίωνος, romanized: Paragraphe Hyper Phormionos) was a speech composed by the Athenian logographer Demosthenes. It was delivered on Phormion's behalf, possibly by Demosthenes himself, probably in 350–49 BC. It is the thirty-sixth speech in the Demosthenic Corpus.

== Contents ==
Phormion (Note: This Phormion is not the same as the one prosecuted by Chryssipus in "Against Phormion", the 34th speech in the Demosthenic corpus.) was a former slave who had been given his freedom as a reward for his good service. When Pasion, his former owner, died, Phormion was named in the will as one of the guardians of Pasion's youngest son Pasikles, who was still a child, in which position he was responsible for the management of Pasion's estate. He also married Pasion's widow Archippe.

"For Phormion" deals with a dispute between Pasion's elder son, Apollodoros of Acharnae and Phormion, over the handling of Apollodoros' inheritance. Apollodoros had claimed that Phormion had never paid back an 11 talent loan, and prosecuted Phormion to compel him to repay it with interest – a total of 20 talents. To block this, Phormion counter-sued, claiming that Apollodoros had previously made a formal declaration that all Phormion's debts to him had been fulfilled. Apollodoros, he claimed, therefore did not have standing to sue. "For Phormion" was written to deliver as part of this countersuit.

The speech was composed to be presented by a supporter of Phormion, rather than Phormion himself. Phormion had apparently been unable to speak, either due to his poor Greek or incapacity due to illness or old age. Though it is not certain whether the speech was delivered by Demosthenes or another friend of Phormion, the orator Dinarchus writes that Demosthenes did give a speech on behalf of Phormion in a trial; it is likely that this is a reference to "For Phormion".

"For Phormion" is one of the few speeches from ancient Athens for which we have any information about the result of the case. Apollodoros' first speech "Against Stephanos" shows that Phormion's countersuit was successful, and he won the case.

== Works cited ==
- MacDowell, D.M. (2004). Demosthenes: Speeches 27–38. Austin: University of Texas Press.
- MacDowell, D.M. (2009). Demosthenes the Orator. Oxford: Oxford University Press.
- Paley, F. A.; Sandys. J. E. (1886).Select Private Orations of Demosthenes, Part 1 (in Greek with introductory notes in English). Cambridge University Press.
