= Representation of women in Athenian tragedy =

Depictions of women in Athenian tragedy plays

The representation of women in Athenian tragedy was performed exclusively by men and it is likely (although the evidence is not conclusive) that it was performed solely for men as well. The question whether or not women were admitted at theatre is widely contested and tends to polarise fronts. Even though Henderson excludes women from all public poetry: “drama, like all public poetry in the classical period, was written, produced and performed only by men, and the dramatic festivals were organized and controlled by the demos, the sovereign corporation of adult male citizens”, he does not rule out female spectators.

Archaeological evidence collected by Haigh and Lucas and more recently by Hughes seems to point to the direction that women were in fact admitted to tragedy, and probably even to comedy. Dover added that women, like children, foreigners and slaves, could take a seat only after male citizens were accommodated. As Hughes points out: “we ought to say we have no direct proof that women took part; there is only a massive absence of evidence, an historical vacuum.”

In a society that valued women’s silence, their predominance in the most public of Athenian art-forms constitutes a paradox. Only one of the surviving 32 plays has no female characters: Sophocles' Philoctetes. Female tragic choruses also outnumber the male choruses by twenty-one to ten.

== Cultural stereotype ==
Macaria, in the Heracleidae states that "for a woman, silence and self control are best." The philosopher Xenophon thought females possessed the positive traits of 'vigilance' and 'love for infants'. However Xenophon reflects the Greek fear of these 'others', highlighting their irrationality, religious fervour and sexual passion. Aristotle went further, stating that women were deformed, incomplete males, designed to be subservient to men.

As a result, women had their freedom restricted and were believed to have lived in separate areas to men. In a speech recorded in the Lysias Orations 3.6, a speaker seeks to convey his opponent’s licentiousness by telling how he trespassed into "the women’s rooms where my sister and my nieces were – women who have always lived so decently that they are ashamed to be seen even by relatives." Sheila Murnaghan argues that "it is no accident that what little evidence we do have for actual Athenian women comes largely from courtroom speeches or medical treatises, genres brought into being by conflict and disease."

In Ancient Greece, a woman was viewed as a passive conduit of male fertility, on long term loan by her father. Marriage was an unequal relationship, whereby the husband owned the children and didn’t have the same obligation toward sexual fidelity that the wife had. The playwright Euripides presents two very different reactions to this cultural norm. Firstly, his female protagonist Alcestis, represents the "perfect wife" sacrificing her own life, so her husband, Admetos, can live. Yet as Blondell points out this "female fame is hard won, even oxymoronic" as her own marriage kills her.

The most important relationships within this play are between the men. Heracles goes to the underworld not for Alcestis, but to honour his male friend’s hospitality. Admetos goes against the promise he made to his wife, so as to obey his male friendship. "Alcestis drops out," P. E. Easterling argues, "to facilitate the interaction between the men."

In contrast, however, Euripides' Medea breaks the marital conventions, choosing her husband herself and reacting against his infidelity by breaking the female oath and killing her children. "In a sense," Blondell argues, "every bride was a stranger in a strange land. And every married woman was dependent on her husband."

== Theatrical themes ==
=== The problem of male absence ===
In the surviving plays, women become tragic figures by men’s absence or mismanagement.

Sophocles' Antigone takes action after her uncle Creon refuses to bury her brother Polynices. In Aeschylus' Oresteia, Clytemnestra takes power in Argos because her husband Agamemnon has been away fighting at Troy for ten years. Clytemnestra's later murder of him is motivated by a range of male abuses. Medea becomes the aggressor when her husband Jason plans a new more advantageous marriage.

=== The public versus the private ===
There is also a theme running through the plays based on the setting. Performed in open-air theatres, Classical Athenian tragedy was set outside the private sphere of the home. Indeed, Euripides was notorious for "taking the streets, the bedroom, into tragedy" and thereby reducing its remoteness.

In Hippolytus, Phaedra first appears, carried out of the house by her servants, demanding open air, in order to declare her love for her stepson and thus the spiral of tragedy to unwind. In Aeschylus' Oresteia, Clytemnestra in the first play of the trilogy orders her husband's death outside, while in the second play, her son Orestes forces her into the house to be killed. It is only in the third play, which is in an entirely public space of the court of Areopagus, that order is restored. "This three play sequence," Bushnell argues, "which begins when a self-willed woman takes matters into her own hands, finally achieves closure as figures representing women are removed from view.'

=== The female warrior ===
A woman displaying traits of the heroic Grecian male was not portrayed in a positive light. Euripides' Medea is the prime example. Her name in Greek means "cunning" and is also the word for the Persians (the Greek’s greatest foreign enemy).

Most of the time, a woman is full of fear
Too weak to defend herself or to bear the sight of steel
But if she happens to be wronged in love,
Hers is the bloodthirstiest heart of all.

Ruby Blondell argues that Medea displays stereotypically male attributes that the Greeks held as positive. Possessing courage, intelligence, decisiveness, resourcefulness, power, independence, the ability to conceive and carry out a plan effectively, as well as the art of rhetoric. The nurse even likens her to a rock of the sea, as Patroclus famously does to Homer’s Achilles in the epic poem The Iliad. Yet Medea, similarly to Aeschylus’ Clytemnestra, another "woman with a heart of manly counsel" were not admired but portrayed as "Cruella de Vil" type characters; Medea having murdered the King of the Corinthians, his daughter (Jason's new bride) and her two sons for the purpose of taking revenge on Jason.

So the declaration "that a noble man ought either to live with honour, or die with honour" does not apply to women.

== Public reaction ==
In Plato’s Republic, Socrates thought the impersonation of inferiors, such as women and slaves, that drama utilised was morally harmful. Socrates was also worried "about the ethical damage caused by the representation of 'womanish' emotions in tragedy." Plato unsurprisingly excludes poetry, embodied by the figure of a woman, from his ideal city-state.

The Athenians however thought it important to place on "display those feature[s] of human experience that inspire terror, sorrow and rejection, and they accomplished their mission by giving women visibility and a powerful voice."

== See also ==
- Women in Classical Athens
