= H. S. Versnel =

Dutch ancient historian (1936–2025)

Hendrik Simon Versnel
- Born: 10 October 1936; Rotterdam, Netherlands
- Died: 7 February 2025 (aged 88); Leiderdorp, Netherlands

Academic background
- Education: Leiden University
- Thesis: Triumphus: An Inquiry into the Origin, Development and Meaning of the Roman Triumph (1970)

Academic work
- Discipline: Ancient history
- Institutions: Leiden University
- Doctoral students: Josine Blok
- Notable works: Inconsistencies in Greek and Roman Religion (1990–1993); Coping with the Gods: Wayward Readings in Greek Theology (2011)

Hendrik Simon Versnel (10 October 1936 – 7 February 2025), published as H. S. Versnel and known as Henk Versnel, was a Dutch historian of classical antiquity, known for his work on ancient Greek and Roman religion.

== Biography ==
Versnel was born in Rotterdam on 10 October 1936. After being educated at the Gymnasium Erasmianum in Rotterdam, he studied classics at Leiden University, obtaining the kandidaats (BA) in 1959 and the doctoraal (MA) in 1962. He then worked as a schoolteacher in Rotterdam, teaching Greek and Latin at the Libanon Lyceum from 1962 to 1970 and at the Gymnasium Erasmianum from 1970 to 1971. During this period, he also held a temporary research position at Leiden in 1967, and from 1968 carried out a project on the Roman triumph for which the Dutch Research Council had awarded funding. He defended his doctoral thesis on this topic in 1970, which was published as his first book, Triumphus: An Inquiry into the Origin, Development and Meaning of the Roman Triumph.

In 1971, he was appointed as an assistant professor in the History department at Leiden, becoming a lector in 1978 and a full professor in 1980. In 1990, he published the first volume of his Inconsistencies in Greek and Roman Religion, containing studies of the goddess Isis in the Hellenistic period, of Dionysus in Euripides' Bacchae, and of Hermes in the Roman poet Martial's epigram 5.24. This was then followed by a second volume in 1993, containing a discussion of theories of myth and ritual, along with studies of the Kronia and Saturnalia festivals, of the Thesmophoria and Bona Dea festivals, and of the gods Apollo and Mars. His doctoral students at Leiden included Josine Blok.

In 1994 Versnel became professor ordinarius and the chair of the Ancient History section of the department, and in 1997 he was made a member of the Royal Netherlands Academy of Arts and Sciences. In 1998–1999, he held the Sather Professorship of Classical Literature at the University of California, Berkeley. A revised version of his Sather Lectures, dealing with ancient Greek conceptions of the gods, was published in 2011 as Coping with the Gods: Wayward Readings in Greek Theology.

He retired from his Leiden professorship in 2000. In 2002, he was honoured with a Festschrift, titled Kykeon: Studies in honour of H. S. Versnel. In 2005, he was made an honorary doctor of the University of Heidelberg. In October 2016, a colloquium was held in honour of his eightieth birthday at Oud Poelgeest, a castle near Leiden, leading to the publication in 2023 of a volume of essays responding to Versnel's own work, Coping with Versnel: a roundtable on religion and magic in honour of the 80th birthday of Henk S. Versnel. In 2021, he was made a Knight of the Order of the Netherlands Lion.

He died in Leiderdorp on 7 February 2025, the day on which Leiden University celebrated its 450th anniversary.

== Selected publications ==
- Versnel, H. S. (1970). Triumphus: An Inquiry into the Origin, Development, and Meaning of the Roman Triumph. Brill. ISBN 9789004023253.
- Versnel, H. S. (1990). Inconsistencies in Greek and Roman Religion. Volume 1: Ter Unus. Isis, Dionysos, Hermes. Three Studies in Henotheism. Brill. ISBN 9789004092662.
- Versnel, H. S. (1993). Inconsistencies in Greek and Roman Religion. Volume 2: Transition and Reversal in Myth and Ritual. Brill. ISBN 9789004092679.
- Versnel, H. S. (2011). Coping with the Gods: Wayward Readings in Greek Theology. Brill. ISBN 9789004204904.

== Biographical ==
- Frits Naerebout: 'Levensbericht Hendrik Simon Versnel'. In: Jaarboek van de Maatschappij der Nederlandse Letterkunde te Leiden, 2024-2025, p. 260-271
