= Pasion =

4th-century BC Greek merchant and banker

Pasion (also Pasio; Ancient Greek: Πασίων; c. 440 – 370 BC) was a slave who rose to become a successful banker and Athenian citizen in Ancient Athens in the early 4th century BC.

== Life ==
Pasion was born some time before 430 BC. It is unknown where Pasion came from nor when he arrived in Athens. It is widely presumed that he originated from Syria and the Levant, c. 440 BC when vast numbers of Syrian slaves were brought to Greece through Phoenician ports, Tyre and Sidon. In Athens, he was owned by the bankers Antisthenes and Archestratus, who had a bank at the Piraeus, the harbour five miles out of Athens. During his slavery, he quickly rose to chief clerk (Argyramoibos) in charge of a money-changing table at the port, and proved so valuable that by 394 BC, he had been manumitted and granted resident alien status as reward for his faithful service.

When his owners retired, Pasion inherited the bank and established a shield factory. The gifts he provided Athens included one thousand shields and a trireme. Ultimately, Pasion was granted Athenian citizenship and started investing in real estate in order to accumulate more wealth. When he became too old to work, Pasion had Phormion, another slave, take care of the bank.

Pasion was married to Archippe, who "was thoroughly conversant with the [banking] business; she had access to the bank's records, and detailed knowledge of its complex operations" and was evidently involved in his business.

When Pasion died in 370 BC, his widow married Phormion in order to keep the bank in the family. Reportedly, she destroyed some of the bank records in order to protect Phormion and the business.

Pasion had two sons with Archippe: Apollodorus and Pasikles.

== Sources ==
- Meltzer, Milton. Slavery: A World History. Da Capo, 1993. ISBN 0-306-80536-7
- Oxford Classical Dictionary, s.v. Pasion.
