= Against the Stepmother for Poisoning =

Speech by 5th-century BC Greek orator Antiphon

"Against the Stepmother for Poisoning" (Ancient Greek: Φαρμακείας κατὰ τῆς μητρυιᾶς) is one of fifteen extant speeches by the Athenian orator Antiphon. It is a speech for the prosecution in the case of a woman accused by her stepson of arranging for the murder of his father, her husband. The speech for the defence, apparently made by the sons of the accused woman, does not survive.

The speech does not provide any evidence for the claims made by the prosecution, but instead attempts to appeal to the emotions of the jurors, drawing a parallel between the stepmother's alleged plot and Clytemnestra's murder of Agamemnon in Greek mythology. As with most surviving legal speeches from classical Athens, the outcome of the case is unknown. Scholars generally consider the stepson's case to be weak, though some such as Michael Gagarin have argued that the speech might still have resulted in a successful prosecution.

== Background ==
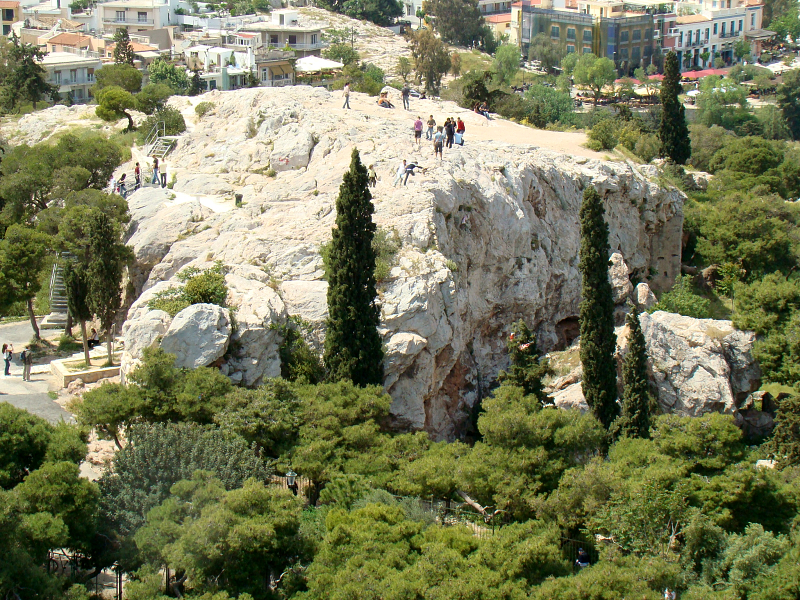
The case against the stepmother was probably for homicide, in which case it would have been tried at the Areopagus

The speech was given as part of a trial of a woman for killing her husband some years previously. The husband had visited his friend Philoneus and had dinner with him; both had died, Philoneus at dinner and the husband twenty days later. Philoneus' mistress was tortured and executed for murder. After Philoneus' friend's son reached adulthood, he prosecuted his stepmother for his father's death; "Against the Stepmother" is a speech for the prosecution from this trial. The defence was conducted by the litigant's half-brother, the son of the woman on trial.

The charge brought against the stepmother was probably homicide (φόνος, phónos). If it was, the case would have been tried at the Areopagus, which dealt with murder cases, including deaths caused by phármaka (φάρμακα, "drugs"). Alternatively, it may have been boúleusis (βούλευσις, "planning") of homicide, in which case it would have been tried at the Palladion.

The exact date of the speech is uncertain, though it is likely to have been composed in the final decade of Antiphon's life (421–411 BC). K.J. Dover suggests that "Against the Stepmother" was produced after what is now known as Antiphon's sixth speech, but before the fifth. Therefore, Dover dates the speech to between 419 and 414 BC. Other scholars consider that "Against the Stepmother" was the earliest of Antiphon's surviving speeches, with Michael Edwards arguing that the speech dates to some time before 421.

== Speech ==
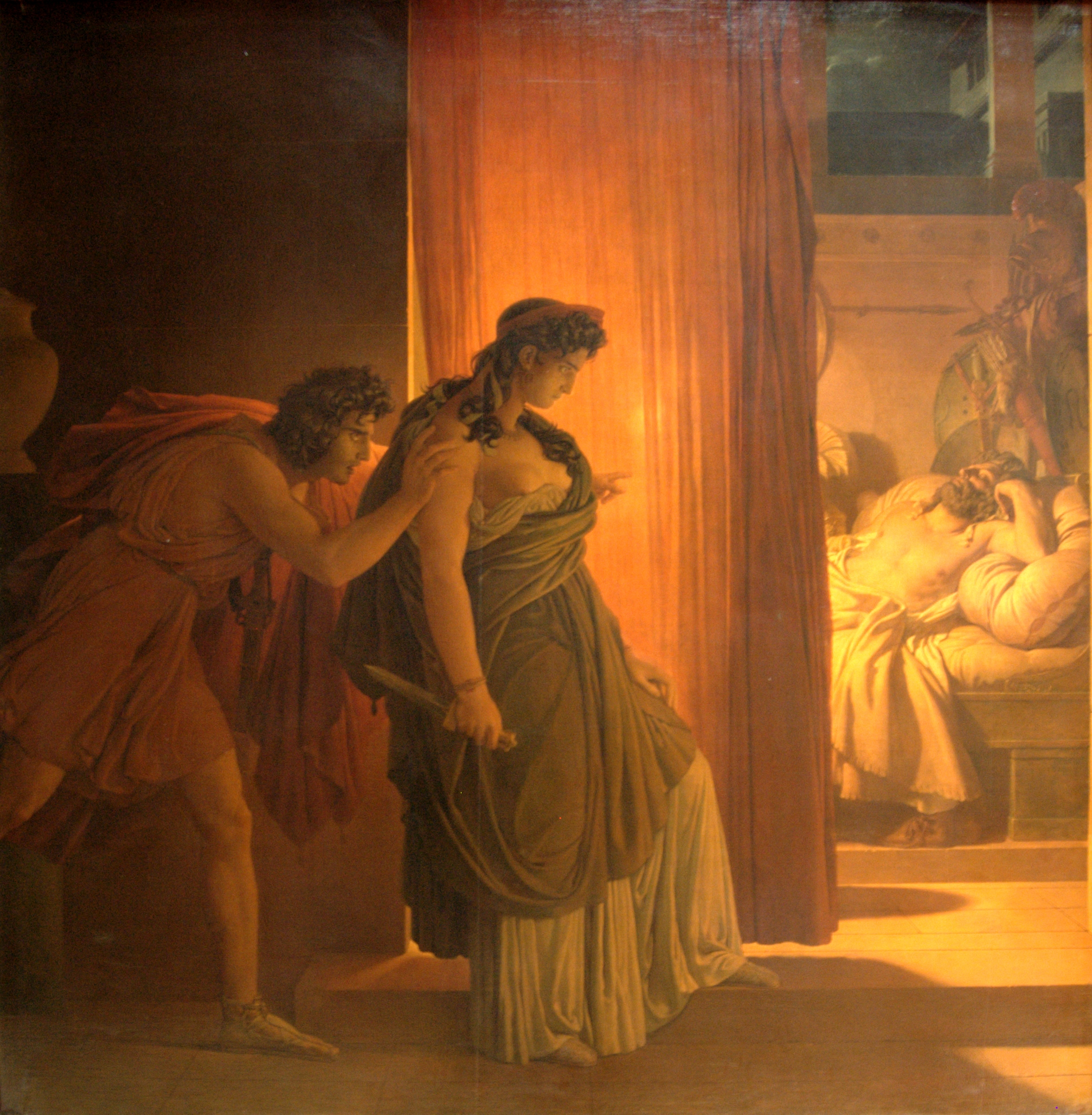
Antiphon's speech compares the plaintiff's stepmother to Clytemnestra, and his murdered father to Agamemnon, shown in this painting by Pierre-Narcisse Guérin.

"Against the Stepmother" is Antiphon's only surviving speech for the prosecution. The plaintiff accuses his stepmother of having murdered his father while he was a child. The speech attempts to prove that the stepmother arranged for her husband to be given a drug with the intention of killing him. The case rests on the argument that the stepmother persuaded another woman, the mistress of her husband's friend Philoneus, to poison her husband. The speaker never explains how he came to learn of this conspiracy, and Victoria Wohl says that he may have made it up entirely.

Aside from the assertion that the stepmother had previously attempted to poison her husband, the speaker provides no evidence of his claims. Instead, he appeals to the jurors' fear of betrayal by their wives, and compares his stepmother's actions to those of Clytemnestra murdering Agamemnon. Esther Eidinow notes that the speech is also reminiscent of the story of Medea, while Victoria Wohl draws comparison to the myth of Deianira told in Sophocles' Women of Trachis. The speech also emphasises the contrast between the speaker and his step-family, claiming that he brought the case out of piety, while his stepmother behaved "godlessly" (atheos) and "profanely" (anosios) in killing her husband.

As women were not allowed to represent themselves in court in classical Athens, the stepmother seems to have been represented by her sons. The speech for the defence does not survive, but it may have argued that the stepmother had not intended to kill her husband, merely to give him a love potion. The Magna Moralia discusses a similar case where a woman was acquitted based on the defence that she was not trying to kill her husband, but was acting out of love. Additionally, Michael Gagarin suggests that the defence may have attempted to portray the stepmother as sympathetic, and the dead man as having treated her badly.

The charge, brought many years after the event, may have been motivated by a dispute over inheritance. As with most surviving Athenian legal speeches, the outcome of the case is unknown. Scholars have generally considered the prosecution case to be extremely weak. Patricia A. Watson notes that the speaker fails to explain the stepmother's motive in poisoning her husband. However, Gagarin argues that though the prosecution case is generally agreed to be weak, the speech is Antiphon's best narrative, and might still have resulted in a successful prosecution. While Gagarin sees the speech's use of references to tragedy as "particularly effective", Wohl suggests that this strategy might have backfired if the tragic allusions in Antiphon's speech instead brought to mind a more sympathetic character, such as Deianira.

== See also ==
- Theoris of Lemnos
- Women in Classical Athens
