= Archippe =

Archippe (circa 410 BC - 361 BC), was an Ancient Athenian businesswoman, wife and businesspartner to the banker and merchant Pasion. She is one of few women known to have been involved in considerable business in Classical Athens.

== Life and career ==
Her background has been the subject of considerable debate and speculation by historians. It is not known if she was born an Athenian citizen, a metic, or a slave, and different opinions have been put forward to support either theory.

Archippe "was thoroughly conversant with the [banking] business; she had access to the bank's records, and detailed knowledge of its complex operations" and was evidently involved in his business.

When Pasion died in 370 BC, Archippe married Phormion in order to keep the bank in the family. Reportedly, she destroyed some of the bank records in order to protect Phormion and the business.

Archippe had two sons with Pasion: Apollodorus and Pasikles.
