= Argyramoiboi =

Argyramoiboi (Ancient Greek: ἀργυραμοιβοί, "silver changers") were professional money-changers and assayers in ancient Greece (especially in the Athenian Agora) and the Byzantine Empire. These often set their tables in public places with their business covering the purchase of foreign currency, paying deposit interest, and loans. They also served as pawnbrokers.

The argyramoiboi used the βάσανος (basanos) or touchstone to determine whether gold is genuine or counterfeit. Byzantine historical records also mentioned the argyramoiboi during the reign of Justinian, who released an edict mandating these money-changers to reduce the price that they pay for a solidus from 210 folles to 180.
