= Polycles (370 BCE) =

Polycles, mentioned in Pliny's Natural History (XXXV.8.19), was an ancient Greek sculptor who flourished during the 102nd Olympiad (370 BCE). He was a contemporary of Cephisodotus the Elder and Leochares. Among the statues of Olympian winners, Pausanias (Description of Greece (vi.4.3) noted the statue of a winner in the pankration by the Athenian Polycles, probably this one.
