= Josine Blok =

Dutch classical scholar

Josine Henriëtte Blok
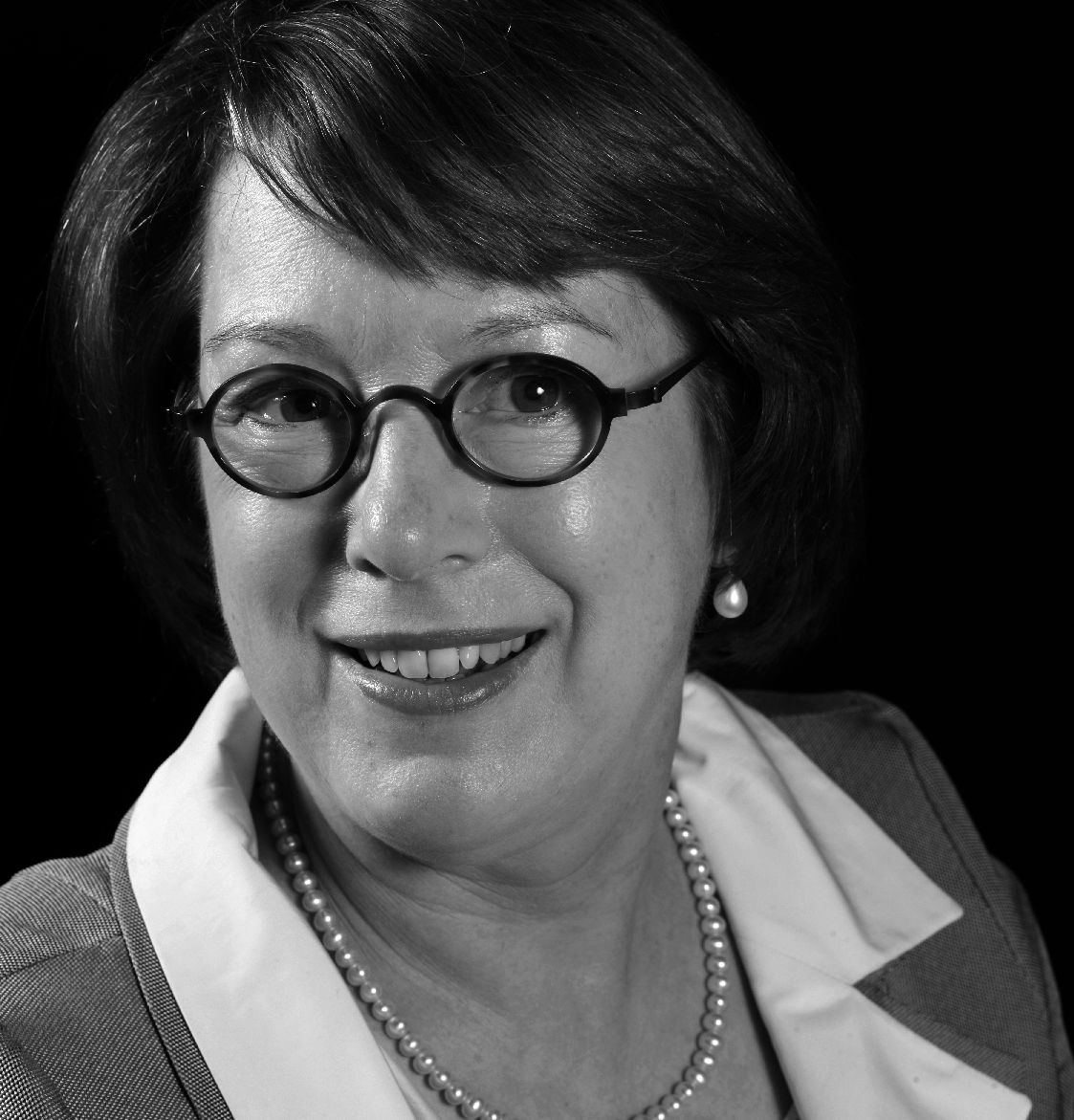
- Born: 9 June 1953 (age 73); Oegstgeest, Netherlands
- Occupation: Classical scholar
- Known for: Research on citizenship in Classical Athens
- Awards: Vici grant (2003)

Academic background
- Education: University of Groningen, Leiden University
- Thesis: Amazones antianeirai. Interpretaties van de Amazonenmythe in het mythologisch onderzoek van de 19e en 20e eeuw en in archaïsch Griekenland (1991)
- Doctoral advisor: H. S. Versnel

Academic work
- Discipline: Ancient History, classical Civilisation
- Institutions: Utrecht University

Josine Henriëtte Blok (born 9 June 1953) is a Dutch classical scholar. She was professor of Ancient History and Classical Civilisation at Utrecht University between 2001 and 2019.

== Career ==
Blok was born on 9 June 1953 in Oegstgeest. She attended the gymnasium and subsequently studied history at the University of Groningen between 1971 and 1978. In October 1991, she obtained her PhD at Leiden University under professor H. S. Versnel, with a thesis titled: "Amazones antianeirai. Interpretaties van de Amazonenmythe in het mythologisch onderzoek van de 19e en 20e eeuw en in archaïsch Griekenland". In 2001, Blok was appointed professor of ancient history and Classical civilisation at Utrecht University.

In 2003, Blok was awarded a Vici grant by the Netherlands Organisation for Scientific Research for research on citizenship in Classical Athens. Blok was one of the scholars who was critical of the book Black Athena by Martin Bernal.

Blok was elected a member of the Royal Netherlands Academy of Arts and Sciences in 2011.

Blok retired in 2019.

== Highlighted Publications ==
1. Malkin, I. and Blok, J. (2024). Drawing lots: From egalitarianism to democracy in Ancient Greece. (Oxford: Oxford University Press)
