= Against Neaera =

Ancient Greek prosecution speech

"Against Neaera" was a prosecution speech delivered by Apollodoros of Acharnae against the freedwoman Neaera. It was preserved as part of the Demosthenic corpus, though it is widely considered to be pseudo-Demosthenic, possibly written by Apollodoros himself. The speech was part of the prosecution of Neaera, a hetaera who was accused of unlawfully marrying an Athenian citizen. Though the speech claims that the case was brought for personal reasons, the date of the prosecution has led scholars to believe that it was in fact politically motivated. In common with most legal cases from ancient Athens, the outcome is unknown.

The speech is important to modern scholars as the best extant biography of a woman from the classical period of ancient Greece, the most extensive surviving source on prostitution in ancient Greece, and the source of Athenian laws on adultery and citizenship which do not otherwise survive. However, it only began to receive significant attention from scholars in the 1990s, as before that period the focus of the speech on prostitution was considered to be inappropriate.

== Authorship ==
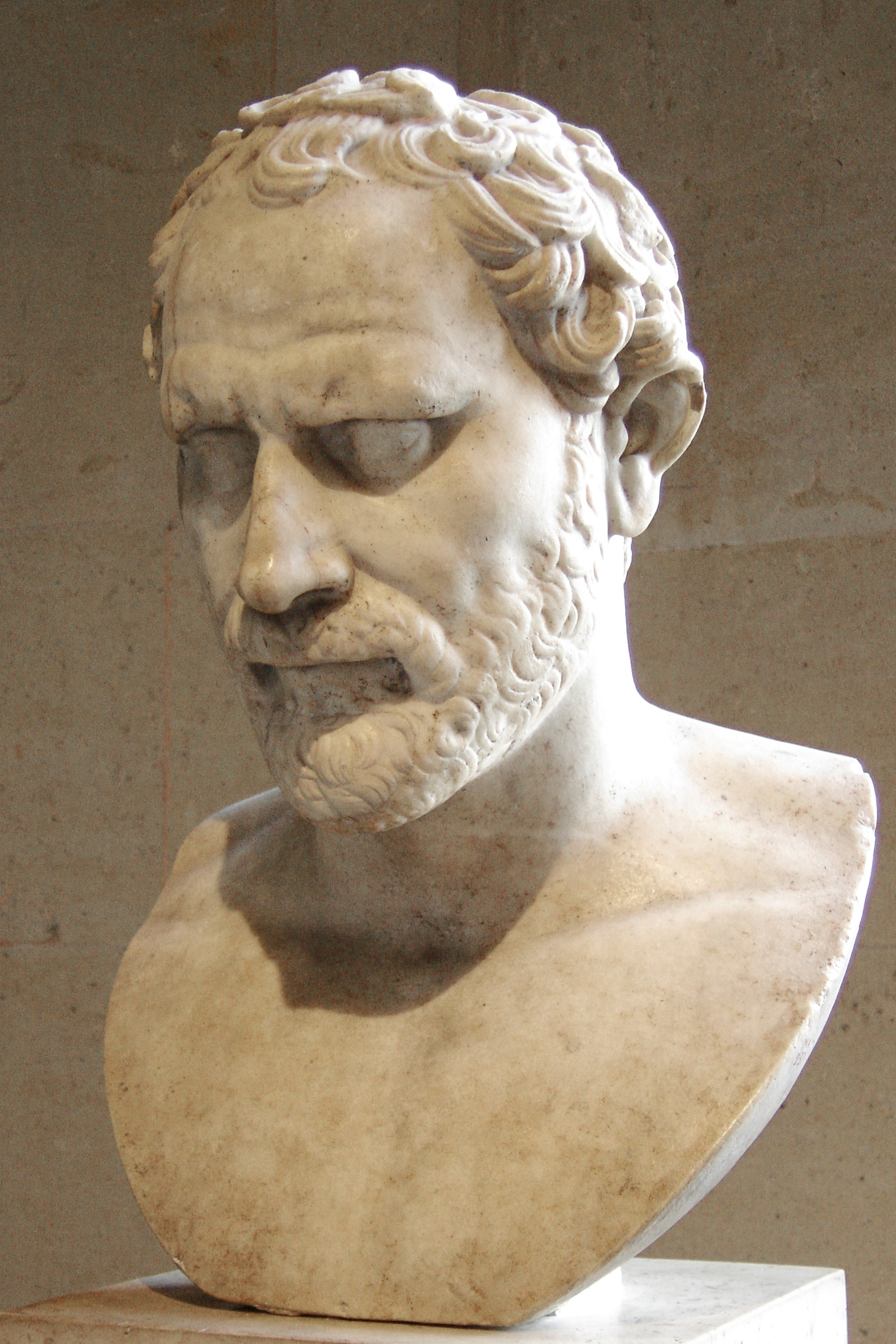
Though the speech was preserved as a work of the orator Demosthenes, he was not the author.

Against Neaera is preserved as Demosthenes' fifty-ninth speech, though it has been thought inauthentic since antiquity. Dionysius of Halicarnassus, for instance, questioned its authorship. Modern scholars from the nineteenth century to the present have generally accepted that the speech was not written by Demosthenes, and today it is often grouped with the rest of the speeches concerning Apollodoros as being the work of a single Pseudo-Demosthenes. (Note: The authorship of the first speech Against Stephanos is disputed, but the second speech Against Stephanos, as well as Against Timotheos, Against Polykles, Against Kallippos, Against Nikostratos, are all generally considered to have been written by Apollodoros.) This author has been identified as Apollodoros himself by various scholars, including Kapparis in his commentary on the speech.

== Background ==
The case against Neaera was brought by Theomnestos, the brother-in-law and son-in-law of Apollodoros. (Note: Apollodoros had married Theomnestos' sister before 365 BC, and had two daughters; Theomnestos later married one of Apollodoros' daughters, his own niece.) In his introduction to the speech, Theomnestos says that he is bringing the case against Neaera in order to exact revenge against her partner (Note: The exact nature of Neaera's relationship with Stephanos is uncertain. She had been in some form of relationship with him for around thirty years by the time of her trial; the prosecution claimed that she – illegally – claimed to be married to him. The position of the defence seems to have been that Neaira was living as Stephanos' concubine (pallake).) Stephanos for his previous attacks on Apollodoros. The enmity between Apollodoros and Stephanos began, according to Theomnestos, when Apollodoros proposed the reallocation of the Theoric fund for military use in 349 BC in preparation for war against Macedon. Stephanos took Apollodoros to court, claiming that the law which he proposed was illegal. (Note: Following Sauppe, modern scholars have tended to read "He produced false witnesses to substantiate the calumnious charge that Apollodorus had been a debtor to the treasury for twenty-five years" here, but Kapparis (1995) dismisses this, and his translation (1999) omits it.) The fine which Stephanos proposed was according to Theomnestos large enough that Apollodoros would have been unable to pay it, and so would have been disenfranchised. The court in fact imposed a smaller fine, which Apollodoros was able to pay. Having failed in his attempt to have Apollodoros ruined and disenfranchised, Stephanos then (Note: Around 346 BC.) had Apollodoros charged with murder. This time, Apollodoros was able to successfully defend himself, and the suit failed.

Following this suit, Theomnestos brought the case against Neaera from which this speech comes, on behalf of his father-in-law. The case was a graphe xenias – the charge that Neaera had illegitimately claimed the rights of Athenian citizenship. Specifically, the case against Neaera claimed that she was living with Stephanos as his wife, when it was illegal for non-Athenians to marry Athenian citizens. The case was brought between 343 and 340 BC; Kapparis argues that an earlier date is more plausible.

The fact that the rivalry between Apollodoros and Stephanos began in 349 BC, though, raises the question of why Apollodoros and Theomnestos waited for such a long time to bring the matter of Neaera to court if their sole motivation was revenge on Stephanos. Grace Macurdy suggested that the motives were in fact political, and that Apollodoros brought the case against Stephanos due to Stephanos' opposition to the anti-Macedonian policies of Eubolos and Demosthenes. She concludes that the case was ultimately to discredit Stephanos in preparation for a new proposal to redirect the money in the Theoric fund for military purposes. Carey suggests in fact it was an attempt to test public opinion to a challenge against the use of surplus money on the Theoric fund when it could instead have been used for defence against the threat of Philip of Macedon.

== Speech ==
Theomnestos begins the speech by introducing the case and the reasons for it, but the bulk of the speech is made by Apollodoros. So much of the speech is made by Apollodoros that at its conclusion he claims to have brought the case against Neaera himself, having apparently forgotten that it is in fact Theomnestos' case. Douglas MacDowell suggests that originally Apollodoros intended to bring the case himself. Apollodoros mainly focuses on attacking Neaera and her daughter Phano, possibly because he cannot produce good evidence for his allegations. He spends most of the speech going over Neaera's life as a hetaera, from her purchase by Nikarete to her going to live with Stephanos, and the failure of Phano's two marriages. He demonstrates that Neaera was not an Athenian citizen, though he "failed to establish conclusively" that Neaera was married to Stephanos, or that she passed her children off as Athenian citizens.

The style of the speech differs noticeably from that of authentically Demosthenic orations. The style is considered "sometimes[...] rough" by Kapparis, with "endless, sometimes clumsy sentences". The oration makes frequent use of quoted speech, which Kapparis argues was a deliberate device to make vivid the events Apollodoros describes. Apollodorus' speech, following Theomnestus' introduction, begins with a long narrative from §18 to §84; this is unusual in Greek legal speeches but typical of Apollodorus' style.

The outcome of the speech is unknown, though modern commentators have criticised the evidence that Apollodoros put forward as failing to prove his case. Kapparis suggests, however, that despite the weak case for his position, Apollodoros may have been able to persuade the jury to his side by playing on their prejudices and fears.

== Legacy ==
The speech Against Neaera is significant as the fullest extant narrative of the life of a woman in the classical period. It is the most extensive surviving source on Greek prostitution, and is also valuable for what it says about women and gender relations in the classical world. Accordingly, it is today frequently used in teaching about Athenian law and society, though due to the focus on prostitution, it was "not deemed appropriate for undergraduates of earlier generations" and so has only recently been the subject of much scholarly attention.

Since 1990, Against Neaera has been the subject of much attention by classicists, including two editions with translation and commentary, and a biography of Neaera. As well as its importance for women's history, the speech has been described as a "very important source for Athenian law and social history". It is a primary source for a number of Athenian laws, including ones on adultery (Note: For a discussion of the differences between the manuscript reading of this law and that taken by modern editions, see Johnstone (2002), who favours the manuscript reading. Carey (1992) and Kapparis (1999) both have the emended text.) and citizenship. It is also the best source of evidence about the granting of Athenian citizenship to the people of Plataea for their service to Athens, after the capture of Plataea by Sparta during the Peloponnesian War.

== See also ==
- Prostitution in Ancient Greece
- Women in Classical Athens
- Against the Stepmother for Poisoning – another judicial speech, which provides insight into the status and social roles of women in Classical Athens
