= Neaira (hetaera) =

4th-century BC Greek hetaera

Neaira (/niˈaɪrə/; Ancient Greek: Νέαιρα), also Neaera (/niˈɪərə/), was a hetaera who lived in the 4th century BC in ancient Greece. She was brought to trial between 343 and 340 BC, accused of marrying an Athenian citizen illegally and misrepresenting her daughter as an Athenian citizen.

The speech made against Neaira in this trial by Apollodorus is preserved as Demosthenes' fifty-ninth speech, though the speech is often attributed to Pseudo-Demosthenes, who seems to have worked on many of the speeches given by Apollodorus. The speech provides more details than any other about prostitutes of antiquity, and consequently a great deal of information about the sex trade in ancient Greek city-states (polis).

== Speech Against Neaira ==
Against Neaira is the source of most of the details of Neaira's biography. It concerns a case brought against Neaira when she was about fifty by Apollodorus' son-in-law Theomnestus, though apart from a brief introduction of the case given by Theomnestus, Apollodorus delivered the entirety of the speech. The case revolves around the accusation that Neaira, a foreigner, married an Athenian citizen, and that she was attempting to pass off her own children as Athenian citizens.

While the speech revolves around the life of Neaira, this is of little importance to the substance of the accusations. The details seem to be part of the speech in the hope that the salacious accusations will hide the weakness of Apollodorus' case. The accuracy of the evidence given in the speech has been questioned, and is known to contain both lies and inaccuracies. Despite this, the speech tells us much about the life of an accomplished hetaera, and is extremely valuable to historians as a source on women's lives in classical Greece. Indeed, it is the most reliable extant source on prostitution in the classical world and one of the best sources on women's lives and gender relations in general for the period.

== Biography ==
=== Life with Nikarete ===
Neaira was probably born in the first decade of the fourth century BC. Her place of birth is unknown, and the earliest event in her life that we know of is her purchase when she was a young girl by Nikarete. Nikarete trained the girls she purchased to be hetaerae, calling them her daughters in order to increase the price her customers would pay, and lived with them in Corinth.

Neaira's work as a prostitute started before she reached puberty. She is twice described by Apollodorus as having sex for money before she came of age, though possibly due to her age he implies that she was not yet a hetaera. During this time, the orator Lysias was a prominent guest in Nikarete's brothel and a regular customer of Metaneira, another of Nikarete's girls. In order to reward her for her services, he arranged for her to be initiated into the Eleusinian Mysteries, and funded the journey. Neaira was at this time about twelve or thirteen, and Nikarete accompanied them. Neaira visited Athens again for the Great Panathenaea of 378, this time accompanying Simus of Thessaly, a young aristocrat.

=== Leaving Nikarete and Corinth ===
Around 376 BC, Timanoridas of Corinth and Eukrates of Lefkada paid thirty minae to purchase Neaira from Nikarete, at the high end of prices for hetaerae. When the men married, they agreed to let Neaira buy her freedom for twenty minae, which, with the aid of gifts and loans from her former customers, she did. As part of this deal, Neaira agreed to no longer work as a prostitute in Corinth, and so left the city for Athens with Phrynion, who had helped her buy her freedom.

Neaira was certainly living with Phrynion in Athens by 373 BC, when he took her to a feast given by the general Chabrias to celebrate his victory in the Pythian Games. During this celebration, Apollodorus says, Neaira was sexually assaulted by the guests and slaves of Chabrias while she was drunk and asleep. Due to this and other mistreatment by Phrynion, in 372 BC Neaira left his household and went to Megara, taking with her her clothing and jewellery, two maids, and other possessions belonging to Phrynion.

=== Life with Stephanus ===
In Megara, Neaira continued to work as a hetaera, and in 371 met Stephanus. Stephanus offered to act as her patron if she returned with him to Athens. Apollodorus claims that with her she brought two sons and a daughter to Athens, but modern commentators have largely concluded that the sons in question were in fact those of Stephanus, by an Athenian woman. Indeed, Christopher Carey points out that one of the sons, at least, was probably a legitimate son of Stephanus, being named after his father, and John Buckler notes that Apollodorus contradicts himself on whether Neaira's alleged sons were hers by another man, or hers by Stephanus.

Phrynion learnt that Neaira was back in Athens, and attempted to take her back from Stephanus. Stephanus resisted, claiming that as Neaira was a free woman he had no right; a claim which Phrynion proceeded to challenge in court, though he was persuaded to settle the case by arbitration instead. The arbitrators decided that Neaira was indeed free, and that in addition to this she was her own kyria (mistress); this was an extremely unusual decision in a society where all citizen women, at least, had a kyrios (master). Despite this unusual level of freedom, however, Neaira was compelled to split her time between the two men as they agreed, without any input herself.

=== Trial ===
Sometime between 343 and 340 BC, Neaira was brought to trial by Theomnestus on behalf of his father-in-law Apollodorus, accused of xenias (representing herself as a citizen when in fact she was not). If she was convicted, the maximum penalty Neaira faced was being sold into slavery and having her property sold. Neaira herself would not have been permitted to speak at her trial, though she was probably present.

The only surviving record of the trial is the speech given by Theomnestus and Apollodorus against Neaira and Stephanus, and the outcome is unknown. No records of Neaira exist after the trial. Modern commentators have noted the weaknesses in Apollodorus' arguments, though as the outcome of an Athenian trial depended heavily on what the parties involved could persuade the jury to accept, and how much of their dishonesty they could get away with, it cannot be said for certain that the suit failed.

== See also ==
- Women in classical Athens
