= Pseudo-Demosthenes =

The speeches of Pseudo-Demosthenes are those preserved among the speeches of Demosthenes, but not thought to have been authored by him.

Among the Pseudo-Demosthenic works are six of those written for Apollodorus of Acharnae, (46, 49, 50, 52, 53, and 59), all of which seem to have been written by the same author. The author of these speeches has been identified as Apollodorus himself. Demosthenes' speech 45 also concerns Apollodorus, but seems to be genuine. Additionally, speech 47, though it does not concern Apollodorus, was probably written by the same author as these six, which Friedrich Blass considered to be evidence that the speeches were not in fact written by Apollodorus, but an otherwise unknown minor logographer. However, Kapparis considers that speech 46 can only have been composed by Apollodorus, as there is no reason that he would have hired two different logographers, one to compose his first speech and a second to draft his reply to the defence. Kapparis concludes that either speech 46 must be written by Demosthenes or Apollodorus, and as it is stylistically drastically different from Demosthenes' speeches and similar to the other speeches given by Apollodorus, Apollodorus himself must have been the author of these speeches.

Additionally, at least two of the Apollodoran speeches, 52 and 53, cannot have been authored by Demosthenes, because he would not have been old enough when they were written.
