= Apollodorus of Acharnae =

4th-century BC Athenian politician

Apollodorus of Acharnae (Ancient Greek: Ἀπολλόδωρος, romanized: Apollodōros; 394 – after 343 BCE) was an Athenian litigant and orator, known from several ancient forensic speeches which were preserved as part of the Demosthenic corpus. He was the son of Pasion, a wealthy banker who had been granted Athenian citizenship in thanks for the gifts he had made to the city of Athens.

== Life ==
Apollodorus was the son of the banker Pasion, and was born when his father was not yet an Athenian citizen. His mother was called Archippe. Some time between the birth of Apollodorus and 376 BCE, Pasion was made an Athenian citizen, along with his sons. In 370 BCE, when Apollodorus was 24, his father died, leaving part of his property in the hands of his bank manager Phormion. Following the death of Pasion, Apollodorus' mother remarried to Phormion, a non-Greek who was the ex-slave of Pasion. Due to the wealth he had inherited from Pasion, Apollodoros was responsible for a number of liturgies. He was trierarch twice, once before his father's death and once in 368, and syntrierarch thrice more. He was also choregos in 352–1, winning the prize at the Dionysia.

Apollodorus married by 365 BCE, and had two daughters, born around 365 and 363 respectively. In 360 Apollodorus' mother died, leaving Phormion, whom she had married after the death of Pasion, as the guardian of Apollodorus' brother Pasicles.

Politically, Apollodorus allied himself with Demosthenes and his anti-Macedonian opinions, in 349–8 BCE proposing the use of the Theoric Fund for military purposes. This proposal, though it was passed by the Assembly, was found to be illegal, and Apollodorus was fined one talent.

== Litigation ==
In 350 BCE, Apollodorus brought a lawsuit against Phormion. Demosthenes wrote a speech for the defence, which survives as For Phormion. A rumour later circulated that Demosthenes leaked the defence speech to Apollodorus before the trial.

Apollodorus was involved in many lawsuits, and seven speeches written for him in these cases are preserved as part of the Demosthenic corpus. Six of these speeches, however, are generally attributed to a pseudo-Demosthenes, often identified as Apollodorus himself. Apollodorus' final preserved speech is Against Neaera, which dates to between 343 and 340 BCE, after which we know nothing of his life.
