= List of prostitutes and courtesans of antiquity =

The following is a list of prostitutes and courtesans of antiquity mentioned by ancient sources.

== Greece and Rome ==
Name	Dates	Biography
Abrotonum (Ἀβρότονον), of Thrace	early 5th century BC	Plutarch calls her the mother of Themistocles and quotes her epitaph in full. A very similar epitaph is in the Anthologia Graeca. Plutarch also refers to an Abrotonum in his Dialogue on Love. Her name means 'soft tune'.
Abrotonum (Ἀβρότονον)	Fictional	Character in Menander's Epitrepontes. In Lucian's Dialogues of the Courtesans an hetaera of the same name is also mentioned. Also called Habrotonon.
Acca Larentia	8th century BC; mythical	Foster mother of Romulus and Remus. Dionysius of Halicarnassus says she was formerly a prostitute (lupa, 'she-wolf').
Acroteleutium	Fictional	Character in Plautus's Miles Gloriosus. Acroteleutium ('sloppy seconds') is a courtesan (meretrix) in Ephesus and owns a maid named Milphidippa.
Adelphasium	Fictional	Character in Plautus's Poenulus. Adelphasium ('little sister') and Anterastilis ('rival lover'), taken from Carthage as children and enslaved in Rome, are bought and pimped by Lycus ('wolf'). Hanno the Carthaginian eventually arrives and recognises his long-lost daughters.
Anterastylis	Fictional	Character in Plautus's Poenulus. See Adelphasium.
Archeanassa (Ἀρχεάνασσα, Ἀρχαιάνασσα), of Colophon	early 4th century BC	Native of Colophon, living in Athens as an hetaera during the lifetime of Plato. According to one, probably later account, the philosopher as a young man was enamoured of Archeanassa and addressed a four-line epigram to her. This epigram is quoted in full by Diogenes Laërtius in his biography of Plato and by Athenaeus in a survey of famous courtesans. A slightly different version is attributed to Asclepiades in the Anthologia Graeca.
Archidice (Ἀρχιδίκη)	6th century BC	Hetaera of Naucratis mentioned by Herodotus alongside the earlier and more famous Rhodopis.
Aristagora (Ἀρισταγόρα), of Corinth	4th century BC	Hetaera, and mistress of the orator Hyperides, who apparently kept her in a house on the Piraeus. He later delivered the two orations Against Aristagora, charging her with breaking immigration law by failing to obtain a citizen sponsor, as was required of foreign-born residents (metics) by law in Attica.
Aristagora (Ἀρισταγόρα), of Corinth	3rd/2nd century BC	Mistress of Demetrius (grandson of the more famous Demetrius of Phalerum). The events of her life are recorded by Hegesander (quoted by Athenaeus) as evidence of the voluptuous lifestyle of Demetrius. At the Panathenaea Demetrius reared for Aristagora a platform or scaffold (ἰκρίον) which was taller than the Hermae; (Note: Images of Hermes which stood in a row in the Athenian market-place, before which the Panathenaic procession passed.) and at Eleusis, at the time of the Mysteries, he placed a throne for her beside the temple, after threatening that any who should try to prevent him would regret it.
Aspasia (Ἀσπασία), of Miletus	mid 5th century BC	Born at Miletus, but settled in Athens as a metic. According to the conventional understanding of her life in Athens, she worked as a courtesan and then ran a brothel. Some scholars have challenged this view. Glenn contends that she ran an academy for women that became a salon for the great men of the day, including Socrates, Plato, and Pericles, and Kennedy suggests that the accusations in comedy that she was a brothel-keeper derived from this. However, many scholars continue to believe the ancient sources. Kapparis argues that the comic attacks made on Aspasia would not have been accepted by the audience had she been a respectable woman, and that it is therefore likely that she did have a history in prostitution before she became the concubine of Pericles. Whether or not Aspasia worked as a courtesan, her later life, in which she apparently achieved some degree of power, reputation, and independence, has similarities to the lives of hetaerae such as Phryne.
Bacchis (Βακχίς), the Flute-Player	4th century BC	Theopompus says that Bacchis the flautist had been the slave of Sinope the Thracian who brought her establishment of hetaerae from Aegina to Athens, and that she later owned Pythionice, who became the mistress of Harpalus. The historian Menetor (quoted by Athenaeus) praises her beauty and freedom from jealousy; see Plangon of Miletus. Bacchis may be the subject of a lost play by Epigenes. Athenaeus mentions by three different titles a drama of Sopater the parodist: Bacchis (Βακχίς), Suitors of Bacchis (Βακχίδος Μνηστῆρσιν), and Wedding of Bacchis (Βακχίδος Γάμῳ). Bacchis was a popular name for courtesans. A girl, so named, is one of Alciphron's epistolary correspondents, supposed to be writing about the result of the Phryne trial.
Bacchis (Βακχίς), of Samos	Fictional	Character in Plautus's Bacchides. Two elderly lovers are delighted with the attentions of the Bacchis sisters, but one of these has previously informed the spectators that what she has to do will be like "kissing a corpse".
Bacchis (Βακχίς), of Athens	Fictional	Character in Plautus's Bacchides.
Bilistiche (Βιλιστίχη), of Argos	3rd century BC	Hellenistic courtesan of uncertain origin. According to Pausanias, she was a Macedonian; according to Athenaeus, an Argive (said to descend from the line of Atreus); according to Plutarch, a foreign slave bought from the marketplace. She was one of Ptolemy Philadelphus's "great many mistresses", and was posthumously venerated in Egypt as Aphrodite-Bilistiche.
Demo (Δημώ)	3rd century BC	Famous hetaera, named for one of the mythological daughters of Celeus. Her name means 'of the people'. Athenaeus (quoting Ptolemy, son of Agesarchus) says Demo was the mistress of Antigonus Monophthalmus, and Mania was the mistress of his son and heir, Demetrius Poliorcetes. Plutarch conflates the two women when describing the cowardly "hospitality" of the Athenians to Demetrius, who once housed his many mistresses on the Acropolis at great expense and shame to the Athenians. See Lamia, of Athens.
Demo (Δημώ)	Fictional	Several characters in the Anthologia Graeca.
Doricha		See Rhodopis.
Flora	Mythical	The early Christian writers, whose object it was to bring the Roman religion into contempt, relate that Flora had been, like Acca Laurentia, a courtesan, who accumulated a large property, and bequeathed it to the Roman people, in return for which she was honoured with the annual festival of the Floralia. But her worship was established at Rome in the very earliest times, for a temple is said to have been vowed to her by king Tatius, and Numa appointed a flamen to her. The resemblance between the names Flora and Chloris led the later Romans to identify the two divinities. Her temple at Rome was situated near the Circus Maximus, and her festival was celebrated from 28 April till 1 May, with extravagant merriment and lasciviousness.
Glaphyra (Γλαφύρα)	1st century BC	Hetaera. Her marriage to Archelaus II of Cappadocia gave her political power. Her later affair with Mark Antony allegedly occasioned a vulgar poem by Octavian.
Glycera (Γλυκέρα), of Sicyon	early 4th century BC	Pausias of Sicyon painted a celebrated picture of Glycera, a flower girl of his native city, whom he loved when a young man. The combined force of his affection for his mistress and for his art led him to strive to imitate the flowers, of which she made the garlands that she sold. The effort turned him into a very able flower painter. His picture of Glycera with a garland was known in Pliny's time as the Stephaneplocos ('garland-weaver') or Stephanepolis ('garland-seller'). A copy of this picture (apographon) was bought by Lucullus at the Dionysia at Athens for the great sum of two talents.
Glycera (Γλυκέρα), of Thespiae / Attica	later 4th century BC	Daughter of the hetaera Thalassis. Mistress of Harpalus (after the death of Pythionice), and perhaps also of Menander. Her name means 'the sweet one'. Also called by the pet name Glycerium. See also Terence's Andria.
Glycera (Γλυκέρα)	Fictional	Character in Menander's Periceiromene.
Gnathaena (Γνάθαινα)	4th century BC	Athenian hetaera. Her most famous lover was the comic playwright Diphilus.
Laïs (Λαΐς, Λαΐδα), of Corinth	late 5th – early 4th century BC	Often confused with the younger Lais. Also called Axine ('axe-head') for the sharpness of her cruelty.
Laïs (Λαΐς, Λαΐδα) the Younger, of Hyccara / Athens	first half of the 4th century BC	She was the daughter of Timandra (or Damasandra, according to Athenaeus). An anecdote from an otherwise lost work of Sotion (Κέρας Ἀμαλθείας, 'The Horn of Plenty') about the courtesan Lais and the orator Demosthenes is preserved by Aulus Gellius in his Attic Nights. According to Diogenes Laërtius, Laïs and Phryne both failed to tempt Xenocrates.
Lamia (Λάμια)	late 6th – early 5th century BC	According to a later anecdote, one of four hetaerae whom Themistocles yoked to a chariot and paraded through the Ceramicus of Athens. Probably fictional.
Lamia (Λάμια), of Athens / Attica	late 4th – early 3rd century BC	Daughter of one Cleanor. She was originally held in esteem for her artistic skill (she was a flautist), but afterwards became famous as an hetaera also. When Demetrius Poliorcetes defeated the fleet of Ptolemy Soter at Salamis in 306 BC, Lamia was among the booty. Though then already past her prime, she captivated the young Demetrius, and became his mistress. She was one of several courtesans in Demetrius's harem whom he brought with him to Athens and entertained with lavish banqueting, to the shame of the Athenians, on their Acropolis (sacred to the virgin goddess Athena). Lamia owed her influence, it was said, to her wit and skill, and these were celebrated by comic writers (Machon and Lynceus of Samos) as well as the historians of the period, and many anecdotes concerning her have been preserved by Plutarch and Athenaeus.
Leaena (Λέαινα)	Pseudo-historical	
Leontium (Λεόντιον), of Attica	late 4th – early 3rd century BC	Athenian hetaira who was a student of Epicurus and the lover of Metrodorus of Lampsacus.
Metaneaera (Μετάνειρα)	4th century BC	
Myrrhina (Μυρρίνη)	4th century BC	Samian courtesan associated with Demetrius Poliorcetes. See also Lysistrata, Timocles, and La Sainte Courtisane
Nannarium (Νανναριον)	4th century BC	Perhaps a pet name for Nannium the Younger, or else a distinct hetaera with a similar name.
Nannium (Νάννιον)	early 5th century BC	According to a later, doubtful story, one of four hetaerae whom Themistocles yoked to a chariot and paraded through the Ceramicus of Athens.
Nannium (Νάννιον) the Elder	late 5th or early 4th century BC	Founder of a family dynasty of famous hetaerae which included her daughter Corone and granddaughter Nannium the Younger.
Nannium (Νάννιον) the Younger	mid 4th century BC	Daughter of Corone and granddaughter of Nannium the Elder. Also known as Aix ('the goat').
Neaera (Νέαιρα)	4th century BC	See Against Neaera and Nicarete of Corinth.
Nicarete (Νικαρέτη), of Megara	fl. c. 300 BC	
Nicidium (Νικίδιον)	fl. c. 300 BC	
Nicopolis (Νικόπολις)	b. c. 150 BC	
Phila (Φίλα), of Thebes	4th century BC	Enslaved at the Siege of Thebes in 335 BC and ransomed by the rhetor Hyperides, who installed her at his house in Eleusis.
Philaenis (Φιλαινίς), of Samos	Pseudo-historical	Supposed author of a famous sex manual which survives only in fragments. Whether or not she was also a courtesan is disputed, and she may be merely a literary persona representing a "prototypical harlot" in the works of others. According to Plant, the name Philaenis – a diminutive of philaina, the feminine form of the Greek word philos, meaning 'love' – seems to have been commonly used by Greek prostitutes.
Phryne (Φρύνη)	c. 371 – after 316 BC	See also Aphrodite of Cnidus.
Plangon (Πλαγγὼ), of Miletus	4th century BC	Athenaeus, citing Menetor's treatise On Votive Offerings (περὶ Ἀναθημάτων), writes of this woman: "Plangon the Milesian was a celebrated courtesan; and she, as she was most wonderfully beautiful, was desired by a young man of Colophon, who had a mistress already in Bacchis the Samian. Accordingly, when this young man began to address his solicitations to Plangon, she, having heard of the beauty of Bacchis, and wishing to make the young man abandon his love for herself, when she was unable to effect that, she required as the price of her favours the celebrated necklace of Bacchis. And he, as he was exceedingly in love, entreated Bacchis not to see him totally overwhelmed with despair; and Bacchis, seeing the excited state of the young man, gave him the necklace. And Plangon, when she saw the freedom from jealousy which was exhibited by Bacchis, sent her back the necklace, but kept the young man: and ever after Plangon and Bacchis were friends, loving the young man in common: and the Ionians being amazed at this, … gave Plangon the name of Pasiphila ('Dear-to-All')." Two lines of Archilochus follow in Athenaeus: "Pasiphila like a lone fig-tree grows; / She welcomes lovers as it shelters crows." Athenaeus earlier quotes a passage from Anaxilas's Neottis in which Plangon is referred to: "The man whoever has loved a courtesan, / Will say that no more lawless worthless race / Can anywhere be found ... / First there is Plangon; she, like a Chimaera, / Scorches the wretched barbarians with fire; / One knight (ἱππεύς) alone was found to rid the world of her, / Who, like a brave man, stole her furniture / And fled, and she despairing, disappeared." A passage from Timocles's Orestautocleides (also in Athenaeus) lists Plangon among several ageing hetaerae: "And round the wretched man old women sleep, / Nannion and Plangon, Lyca, Phryne too, / Gnathaena, Pythionice, Myrrhine, / Chrysis, Conalis, Hierocleia, and / Lopadion also."
Pythionice (Πυθιονίκη)	4th century BC	Courtesan at Athens and at Corinth. Pausanias says she was married by Harpalus, but Kapparis thinks she was probably only his mistress.
Rhodopis (Ῥοδῶπις)	6th century BC	Celebrated Greek courtesan, of Thracian origin. Also called Doricha.
Thaïs (Θαΐς)	4th century BC	Greek courtesan, who lived during the time of Alexander the Great. She accompanied him on his Asiatic campaign, and is chiefly known from the story which represents her as having persuaded the conqueror to set fire to the city of Persepolis. This anecdote forms the subject of Dryden's Ode to Saint Cecilia's Day. But its authenticity is doubtful, since it is based upon the authority of Cleitarchus, one of the least trustworthy of the historians of Alexander. Thaïs subsequently became the wife of Ptolemy Lagus, king of Egypt. Numerous anecdotes and witticisms are attributed to her by Athenaeus.
Thargelia (Θαργηλία)		According to Plutarch, she was born in Ionia and "made her onslaughts upon the most influential men" of her times. Thargelia was noted for her physical beauty and was endowed with grace of manners as well as clever wits. Plutarch asserts that Thargelia "attached all her consorts to the King of Persia" and sought for the spreading of Persian sympathy in the cities of Greece by means of her clients, "who were men of the greatest power and influence".

== Middle East and India ==
Name	Dates	Biography
Shamhat (𒊩𒌑𒉺, Šamḫat)	Fictional (18th century BC)	In the old Babylonian version of the Gilgamesh epic, a sacred temple prostitute (harimtu) who inducts Enkidu into Babylonian sexual rites and is therefore partly responsible for civilising the wild man. Also called Shamkat.
Rahab	Biblical	In the Book of Joshua, the prostitute Rahab hides two men sent by Joshua to spy on Jericho.

== Sources ==
- Bicknell, Peter J. (1982). "Axiochus Alkibiadou, Aspasia and Aspasios" (PDF). L'Antiquité Classique. 51 (3): 240–250. doi:10.3406/antiq.1982.2070.
- Chisholm, Hugh, ed. (1911). "Thaïs" . Encyclopædia Britannica. Vol. 26 (11th ed.). Cambridge University Press. p. 719.
- Glenn, Cheryl (1994). "Sex, Lies, and Manuscript: Refiguring Aspasia in the History of Rhetoric". College Composition and Communication. 45 (2): 180–199. doi:10.2307/359005. JSTOR 359005.
- Hayward, C. (1926). The Courtesan: The Part She Has Played in Classic and Modern Literature and in Life. The Casanova Society.
- Henry, Madeleine M. (1995). Prisoner of History. Aspasia of Miletus and her Biographical Tradition. Oxford University Press. ISBN 978-0-19-508712-3.
- Kapparis, Konstantinos (2017). Prostitution in the Ancient Greek World. Berlin: De Gruyter. ISBN 978-3-11-055795-4.
- Kapparis, Konstantinos A. (2018). Athenian Law and Society. Routledge (Taylor & Francis). ISBN 9781317177517.
- Kennedy, Rebecca Futo (2014). Immigrant Women in Athens: Gender, Ethnicity and Citizenship in the Classical City. Routledge. ISBN 978-0-415-73786-9.
- Plant, Ian Michael (2004). Women Writers of Ancient Greece and Rome: An Anthology. University of Oklahoma Press. ISBN 978-0-8061-3622-6.
- Pomeroy, Sarah B. (1990). Women in Hellenistic Egypt: From Alexander to Cleopatra. Detroit, MI: Wayne State University Press. ISBN 0814322301.
- Schlesier, Renate (2013). "Atthis, Gyrinno, and Other Hetairai: Female Personal Names in Sappho's Poetry". Philologus. 157 (2): 199–222. doi:10.1515/phil.2013.0017.
- Tsantsanoglou, K. (1973). "The Memoirs of a Lady from Samos". Zeitschrift für Papyrologie und Epigraphik. 12: 183–195. JSTOR 20180553.
- Vessey, D. W. Thomson (1976). "Philaenis". Revue Belge de Philologie et d'Histoire. 1: 76–82.
- Smith, Philip (1869). "Pausias". In Smith, William (ed.). Dictionary of Greek and Roman Biography and Mythology. Vol. 3. Boston, MA: Charles C. Little, and James Brown. p. 162.
- Schmitz, Leonhard (1870). "Flora". In Smith, William (ed.). Dictionary of Greek and Roman Biography and Mythology. Vol. 2. Boston, MA: Little, Brown, and Company. pp. 175–6.
