= Bacchis (hetaira) =

Greek courtesan

Bacchis (Greek: Βακχίς; 4th-century BC) was a Greek hetaira.

She was originally the slave of the hetaira Sinope, who trained her as a hetaira. She was manumitted and eventually became the owner of the hetaira Pythionike, lover of Harpalos.

Bacchis was a famous hetaira and the object of many anecdotes. She is generally praised for her good nature and became a stereotype of a "good courtesan". She was the subject of several popular plays, among them plays by Epigenes and Sopatros of Phakos. She was also a sender and receiver of several of the fictive letters of Alciphron (which presented imagined letters between famous courtesans and their lovers).
