= Archidike =

Famous hetaera

- Ἀρχιδίκη
- Occupation: Hetaera
- Era: 6th century BC
- Known for: Celebrated hetaera of Naucratis
- Notable work: Mentioned by Herodotus and Claudius Aelianus

Archidike (also transliterated Archidice, Greek: Ἀρχιδίκη) was a celebrated hetaera of Naucratis in Egypt. Her fame spread throughout Greece, and was recorded by Herodotus (ii. 136) and Claudius Aelianus (Varia Historia, xii. 63). Herodotus claims that Archidike "became a notorious subject of song throughout Greece", and she is one of only two hetaera mentioned by name in his discussion of the occupation (the other was Rhodopis).

She was reputed to be arrogant and avaricious, and to have charged high prices for her favors. One anecdote told about Archidike is when a young Egyptian became infatuated with her, offering her all his possessions for a night of love. When Archidike refused the offer, the lover asked Venus to give him in dream what Archidike had refused in reality. The prayer was answered, but Archidike heard of it, and had the young man arrested and taken before the judges to make him pay for the voluptuous dream. The judges decided that Archidike should, in turn, pray to Venus for a dream of silver in repayment for a fictitious lover.
