= Phila of Thebes =

Historical Character in Ancient Greece

Phila of Thebes (Greek: Φίλα) (fl. 300s BCE) was a hetaira in Athens. Originally, she was enslaved to a woman called Nikarete who purchased and trained several women to become courtesans. Phila was eventually ransomed for a large sum (possibly 2,000 drachmas) by the famous orator Hyperides, who installed her at his house in Eleusis. Plutarch distinguishes Phila of Thebes, the lover of Hypereides, from Phila of Corinth, Nikarete's courtesan; they were in fact probably the same person.
