= Aedonion =

Aedonion (Ἀηδόνιον; "nightingale") is a character in Alciphron's Letters, a collection of fictional letters depicting everyday life and relationships in ancient Greek society. Aedonion appears specifically in the letter titled "Hectodioctes to Mandilocolaptes" (Τρεχέδειπνος Μαυδυλοκολάπτῃ).

She is a hetaira who is intimately involved with Gorgias, a member of the Eteobutadae family. However, she is angry with him because she considers him ungrateful and ungenerous with gifts given in return for her favours. When Hectodioctes tells her that Gorgias has invited her to dinner, she reacts angrily, grabbing a kettle from the stove and nearly pouring its contents over his head. Hectodioctes manages to escape just in time.
