= Antiphanes of Berge =

Greek writer

Antiphanes of Berge (or Antiphanes the Younger, Ancient Greek: Ἀντιφάνης ὁ Βεργαῖος, 4th century BC) was a Greek writer of the book Ἄπιστα (Apista; "Unbelievable Things"), and was born in Berge, a town in ancient Macedonia near Amphipolis. In his Geographica, Strabo refers to him as an impostor, because Antiphanes wished the reader to believe everything in his book, which actually contained falsehoods. Strabo also attacked the credibility of the writers Pytheas and Euhemerus in the same chapter. The Attic verb βεργαΐζειν (bergaizein) was used in reference to Antiphanes (who lived in Athens). βεργαΐζειν (bergaizein) refers to the telling of unbelievable stories. He also wrote a work on courtesans. He is not to be confused with Antiphanes of Argos, as was done by some ancient writers.

== Writings ==
Ἄπιστα (Apista; "Unbelievable Things") was the primary work which led to Antiphanes' dismissal as an impostor by Strabo. In addition to other writings and plays, however, Antiphanes' mention of the Greek team game "ἐπίσκυρος" (Episkyros) or "φαινίνδα" (phaininda) is thought to be one of the first written records for a game like modern football in European history. Antiphanes's writings (alongside those of Amphis and Anaxilas) are also some of a few examples to make reference to the ancient hetaira Nannion.

== See also ==
- Bergaios
