= Metaneira (hetaera) =

Ancient greek Hetaira

Metaneira (Ancient Greek: Μετάνειρα) was a hetaira active in Classical Corinth and Athens. As a child, she was purchased by Nikarete of Corinth. Details about her life are mostly known from Apollodorus of Acharnae's speech Against Neaira. In the 380s she was a lover of the orator Lysias, who arranged for her to be initiated in the Eleusinian Mysteries. Athenaeus claims that she was also the lover of the orator Isocrates, but Konstantinos Kapparis doubts this as his source is a probably-fictitious letter attributed to Lysias and no other ancient source supports this connection.

A fragment from one of Hypereides' speeches suggests that she was known for her beauty; Athenaeus quotes anecdotes reported by Hegesander of Delphi which showcase her wit.
