= Stephan Bergler =

Transylvanian classical scholar and antiquarian (c. 1680–1746)

- Born: c. 1680; Brasov, Transylvania
- Died: 1746 (aged c. 66); Bucharest, Wallachia
- Occupations: Classical scholar, scientific editor, antiquarian
- Notable work: Editio princeps of Genesius, letters of Alciphron

Stephan Bergler (c. 1680 – 1746) was a Transylvanian Saxon classical scholar, scientific editor, and antiquarian.

== Biography ==
Born in Kronstadt (Transylvania), he studied at the University of Leipzig, after which he went to Amsterdam, where he edited the works of Homer and the Onomasticon of Julius Pollux. Subsequently, in Hamburg, he assisted the major bibliographer Johann Albert Fabricius in the production of his Bibliotheca Graeca and his edition of Sextus Empiricus.

He found a permanent post in Bucharest as secretary to the Prince of Wallachia, Nicholas Mavrocordatos, whose work Περὶ τῶν καθηκόντων (De Officiis) he had previously translated for Fritzsch, a Leipzig bookseller, by whom he had been employed as proofreader and literary hack. In Mavrocordatos' library, Bergler discovered the introduction and the first three chapters of Eusebius's Demonstratio Evangelica. In addition to writing numerous articles for the Leipzig Acta Eruditorum, Bergler edited the editio princeps of the Byzantine historiographer Genesius (1733), and the letters of Alciphron (1715), which contained 75 letters published for the first time.

He died in Bucharest, and was buried at his patron's expense. According to another account, on his patron's death in 1730, Bergler, finding himself without means, left for Istanbul, and died there c. 1740. He is said to have become a convert to Islam — this report was probably a mistake for the undisputed fact that he embraced Roman Catholicism. His edition of Aristophanes was published after his death by the Younger Burman in 1760.

Encyclopædia Britannica (11th ed.) characterizes Bergler's life as "wild and irregular," and says he made enemies due to his allegedly cynical manners.
