= Nannion =

Nannion (c. 350 BC) was a Greek hetaira. Her mother, Korone, and grandmother, Nannion, after whom she was named, were both also hetairai.

She is possibly the same hetaira as Nannarion, to whom several references are known from the mid-fourth century when Nannion was active, including a mention by Menander alongside Nannion's mother Korone. Nannion is mentioned in the speech Against Patrokles by Hyperides, as well as by Antiphanes, Amphis and Anaxilas. She was the subject of several Attic plays, among them Nannion by Eubulus. Nannion was supposedly nicknamed Aix ("the goat"), although this nickname is also associated with another hetaira, Niko.
