= Lais of Corinth (Holbein) =

Painting by Hans Holbein the Younger

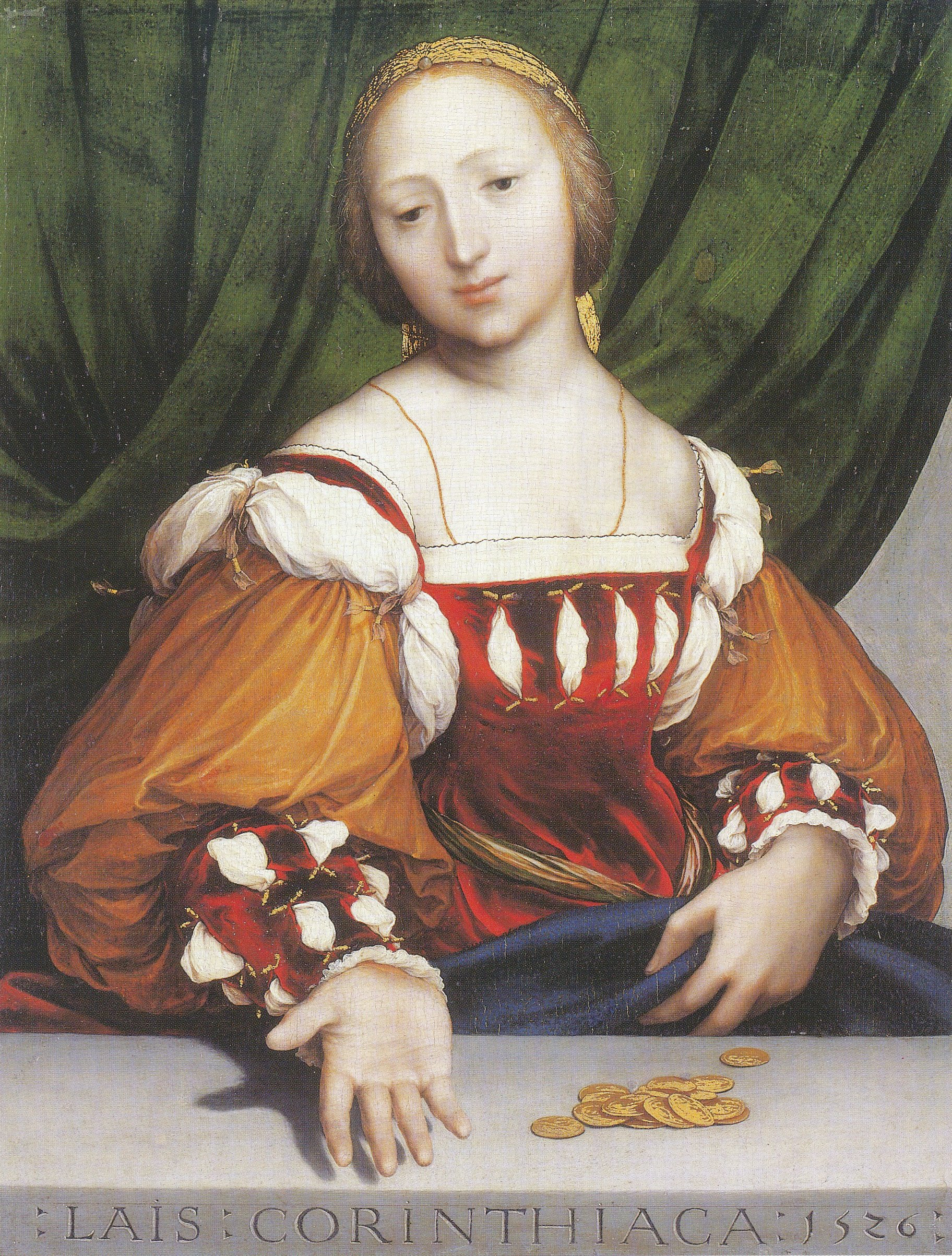
Lais of Corinth, Limewood, 34.6 × 26.8 cm, Kunstmuseum Basel

Lais of Corinth is an oil-and-tempera painting on wood completed in 1526 by the German-Swiss Northern Renaissance painter Hans Holbein the Younger. It portrays the famous Lais of Corinth, a courtesan of ancient Greece who charged a high price for her favours. It has been suggested that Holbein is also referring to the Lais who was the lover of Apelles, the great painter of antiquity (Holbein was called "Apelles" in humanist circles). The model, the same used for the Venus and Amor, has been identified as either Magdalena Offenburg or her daughter Dorothea, as it was noted by Basilius Amerbach in the archives from the Amerbach-Cabinet, that the woman depicted was someone of the Offenburg family. Dorothea would have been eighteen years of age in 1526. It was assumed that either of the two may have been Holbein's mistress. Both paintings, the Venus and the Lais, came into the possession of the Amerbach Cabinet in the late 16th century.

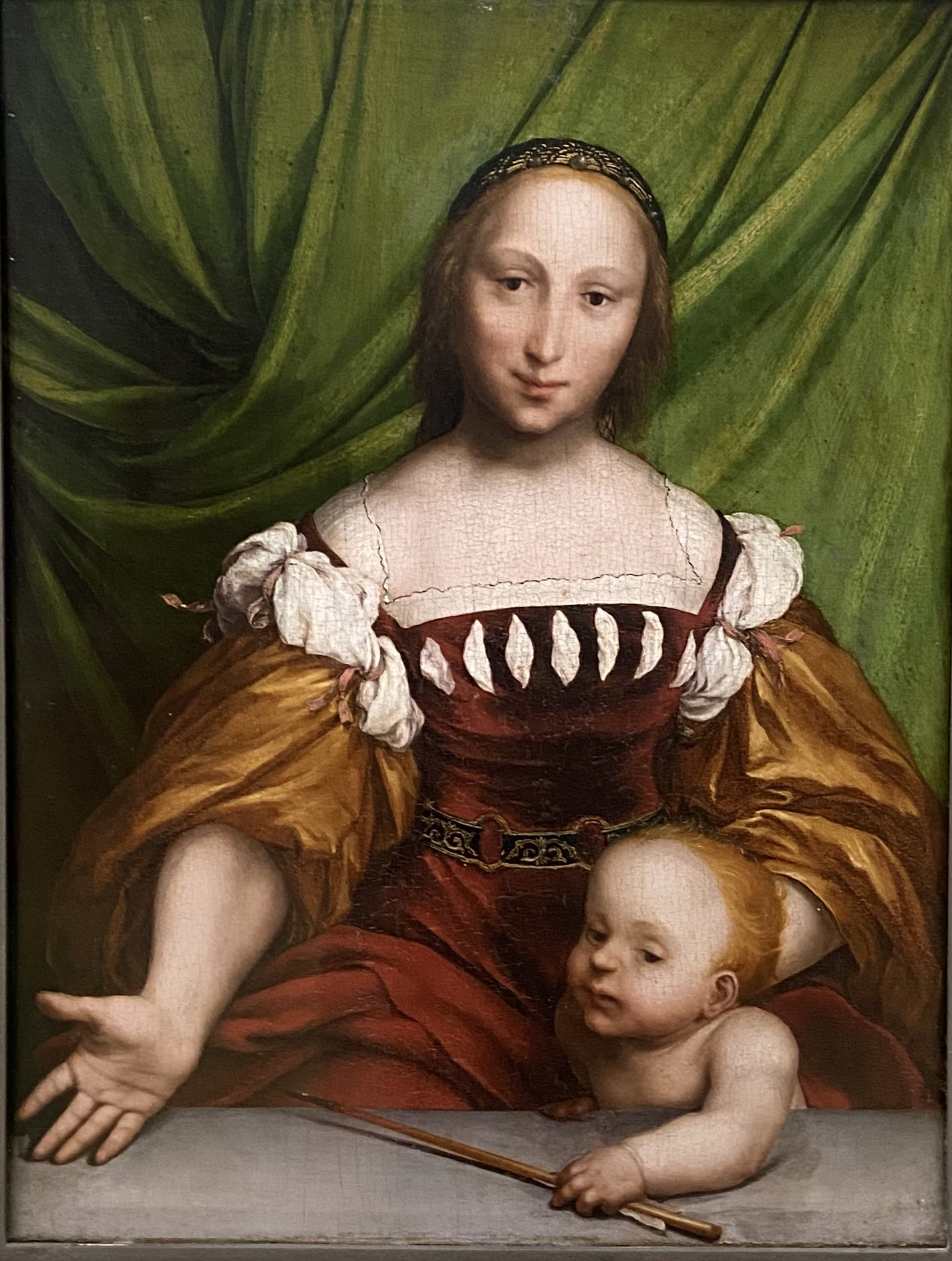
Venus and Amor, 1524
