= Bergaios =

4th-century BC Thracian king in Pangaian region

Bergaios or Bergaeus (Greek: Βεργαῖος), 400 – 350 BC, was a Thracian king in the Pangaian region. He is known mainly from the several types of coins that he struck, which resemble those of Thasos. Bergaios could mean literally, 'a man from Berge' but the legend on the coin is a personal, not a place name.

== Coins of Bergaios ==
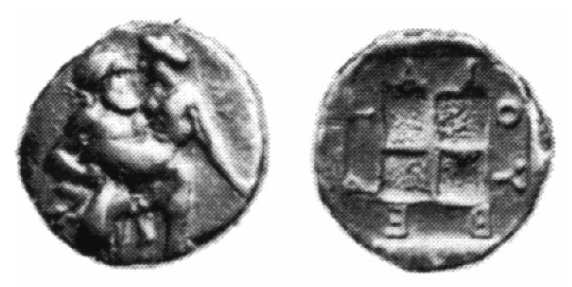
Coin of Bergaios, Silver drachma depicting satyr carrying a nymph. Reverse: inscription ΒΕΡΓΑΙΟΥ round quadripartite square, 400 - 350 BC.

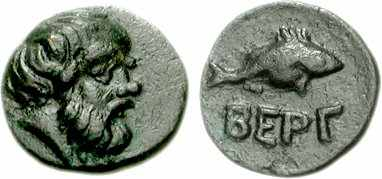
Head of bearded Seilenos or satyr. Reverse: inscription ΒΕΡΓ beneath fish.

== See also ==
- Pistiros
- Thracians
- Antiphanes of Berge
