= Lais of Corinth =

Ancient Greek courtesan

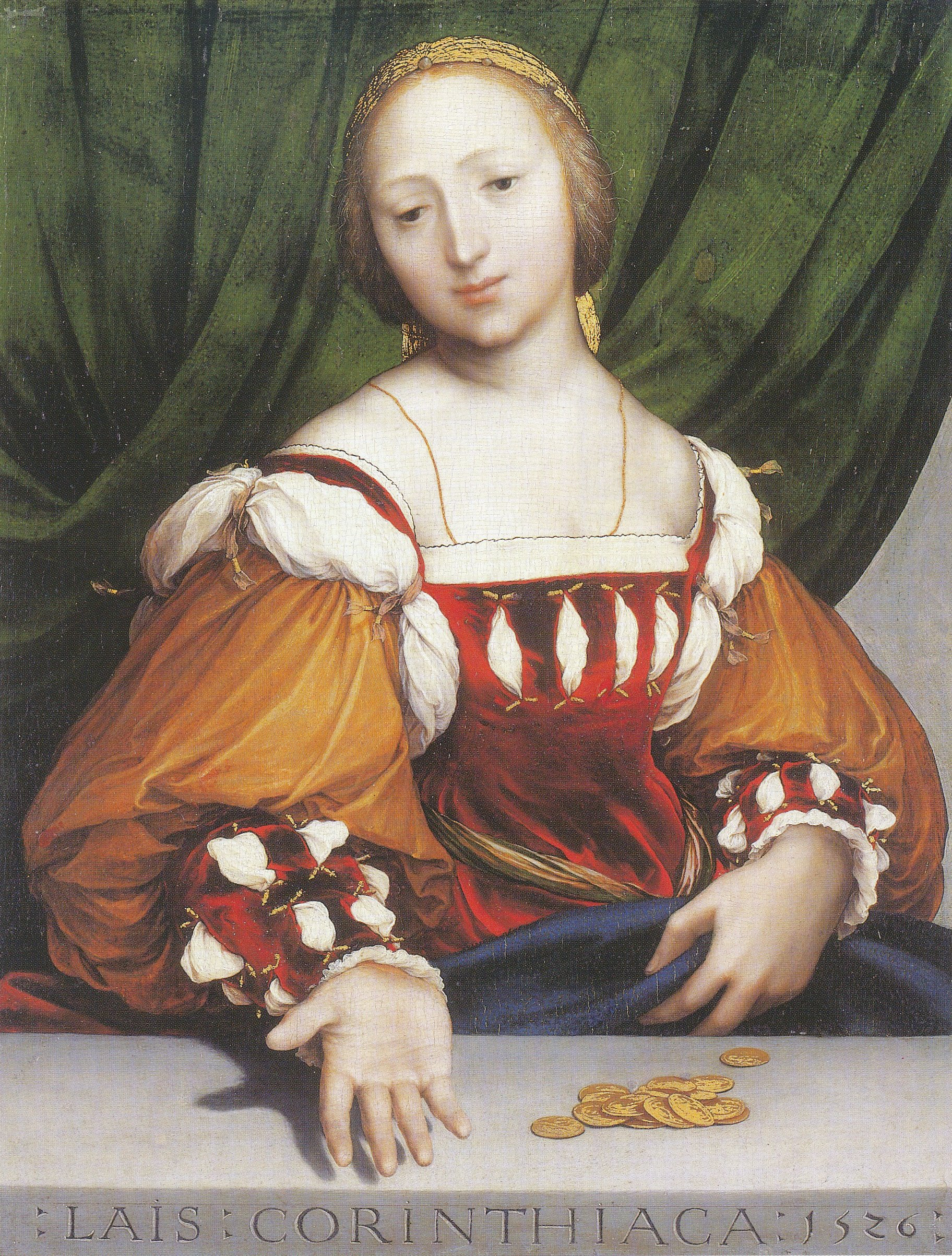
Lais of Corinth by Hans Holbein the Younger, Kunstmuseum Basel

Lais of Corinth (Ancient Greek: Λαΐς) (fl. 425 BC) was a famous hetaira or courtesan of ancient Greece, who was probably born in Corinth. She shared a name with the younger hetaira Lais of Hyccara; as ancient authors (in their usually indirect accounts) often confused them or did not indicate which one they referred to, the two women became inextricably linked. Lais lived during the Peloponnesian War and was said to be the most beautiful woman of her time. Among her clients were the philosopher Aristippus (two of his alleged writings were about Lais), Demosthenes, and the Olympic champion Eubotas of Cyrene.

Aelian relates a tradition that either she or the other Lais held the nickname "Axine" ("axehead"), for the sharpness of her cruelty. Anne Robertson noted that Corinth was in antiquity famous for its supposed thousand temple prostitutes, including Lais, and that the city's reputation “added a new word to the Greek language: korinthiazesthai, "to live like a Corinthian" - a life of wealthy, drunken debauchery.”

Lais was depicted in a 1526 portrait by Hans Holbein the Younger.
