= Lais of Hyccara =

Ancient greek heteira

Lais of Hyccara (Ancient Greek: Λαΐς and Λαΐδα) (died 340 BC) was a hetaira (courtesan) of Ancient Greece. She was probably born in Hyccara, Sicily (modern Carini) and died in Thessaly. She was a contemporary of another courtesan with the same name, Lais of Corinth. Since ancient authors in their (usually indirect) accounts often confused them or did not indicate which they refer to, the two have become inextricably linked.

There are a number of surviving anecdotes about Lais of Hyccara. For example, it was said that Demosthenes offered to pay 1,000 Greek drachmas for a night with her, but that she raised her price to 10,000 drachmas after seeing him, while she gave herself to Diogenes for nothing. Claudius Aelian relates that she bore the nickname Axine ("axehead"), for the sharpness of her cruelty.

She was the daughter of Timandra (or Damasandra, according to Athenaeus). She was a contemporary and rival of Phryne. She fell in love with a Thessalian named Hippostratus or Hippolochus, who brought her to Thessaly. It is said that Thessalian women out of jealousy lured her into the temple of Aphrodite and stoned her to death. She was buried on the banks of Peneus.
