= Aristagora =

Aristagora (Ancient Greek: Ἀρισταγόρα) can refer to one of two women in classical antiquity:

- Aristagora, a hetaira, and mistress of the orator Hyperides, against whom he afterwards delivered two orations. In these orations, Hyperides accuses her of breaking immigration law by failing to obtain a citizen sponsor, as was required by law in Attica. However it is generally believed by modern scholars that the accusation, though perhaps true, was essentially a pretext on which Hyperides could harass Aristagora after a bad breakup.
- Aristagora, a woman of Corinth, also a hetaira, and the mistress of Demetrius of Phalerum, the grandson of (the much more well known) Demetrius of Phalerum.
