= Rhodopis =

Ancient Greek hetaera

Rhodopis (Ῥοδῶπις, fl. 6th century BCE) was an ancient hetaira (courtesan) who lived in Naucratis in Egypt. She first appears in the Histories of Herodotus, who tells several stories about her life. Various ancient traditions connect her to the fable-teller Aesop, the poet Sappho (through her brother Charaxos), the Pyramid of Menkaure at Giza, and the sanctuary at Delphi. A story about her, first recorded by the Greek historian Strabo in the late first century BCE or early first century CE, is sometimes considered the earliest known variant of the "Cinderella" story.

== Life ==
The Beautiful Rhodope in Love with Aesop 1782. Engraving by Francesco Bartolozzi after a painting by Angelika Kauffmann.

According to Herodotus, Rhodopis was a Thracian by birth. She was a slave of a man from Samos, Iadmon, alongside the fable-teller Aesop, (Note: According to Pliny the Elder in his Natural History, Aesop and Rhodopis were lovers.) before being brought to Naucratis as a slave by another Samian man, Xanthes. While in Naucratis, she had her freedom bought by Charaxos, the brother of the poet Sappho; as a free hetaira she became rich and subsequently dedicated one tenth of her wealth at Delphi in the form of iron spits. Herodotus' description of Rhodopis is the earliest use of the word hetaira in Greek literature to denote a kind of sex-worker.

=== Pyramid ===
One of the major aspects of ancient traditions about Rhodopis was her supposed connection to one of the pyramids at Giza; by the imperial period this connection was well enough established that the pyramid was known as the "hetaira's tomb". Herodotus reports a tradition that the Pyramid of Menkaure was built by Rhodopis. According to Strabo, one of the pyramids was built for Rhodopis by her lovers – this story is also mentioned by Diodorus Siculus. Herodotus himself is sceptical of the reputed connection between Rhodopis and the pyramids, observing that she lived many centuries after they were constructed, and doubting that any individual would have had the resources to build one.

Strabo and Aelian both tell a story about Rhodopis that, while she was taking a bath, an eagle stole her sandal and dropped it in the lap of the king – unnamed by Strabo but identified by Aelian as Psammetichus. The king was so struck by this that he ordered the woman whose sandal it was should be found and brought to him, and he married her. After her death, a pyramid was built for her tomb. This version of the story, with its similarities to the shoe-motif and its royal marriage, is an early analogue to or variant of the folk tale Cinderella. It is sometimes considered the earliest known version of the Cinderella story. Gregory Nagy suggests that all of the stories connecting Rhodopis to the building of a pyramid derive from an earlier Egyptian tradition attributing the pyramid to the Egyptian queen Nitocris.

=== Delphi ===
Herodotus reports that Rhodopis dedicated one tenth of her wealth to the sanctuary at Delphi, in the form of iron spits. According to Herodotus, this dedication was still on display in his day, near the Altar of the Chians. A fragmentary inscription from Delphi, which has been reconstructed as reading "Rhodopis dedicated", survives – although Kurt Raaflaub has disputed this reconstruction, noting that the inscription dates to c. 530 BCE, which he calls "barely possible for Rhodopis".

The story of Rhodopis' dedication is one of a series of references in Greek literature to public monuments to sex workers. These were frequently presented as transgressing norms through their size, expense, or location. According to Plutarch, the portrait statue of the courtesan Phryne at Delphi, a famous later example of such a monument, was sited near Rhodopis' dedication.

=== Sappho and Charaxos ===
May Doricha find you most bitter, Aphrodite,
and may she not boast, saying
she came the second time
to longed-for love.

— Sappho 15, lines 9–12
trans. Diane Rayor

Several ancient sources tell the story of Sappho's brother Charaxos and his connection to a hetaira from Naucratis. The specifics of the story vary from source to source, however. According to some the hetaira was called Rhodopis; others call her Doricha. Some describe Sappho's poems discussing the affair as critical of either Charaxos or Doricha/Rhodopis; others suggest a much less critical tone.

Though several fragments of Sappho's surviving poetry apparently deal with Charaxos and his voyage to Naucratis (particularly fr. 5 and the Brothers Poem discovered in 2014), none of them can be identified with certainty with the critical poem mentioned by Herodotus, Athenaeus, and Strabo. Joel Lidov has argued that in fact there was no such poem and the ancient tradition connecting Sappho to Rhodopis derived from a later source, perhaps 5th-century Athenian comedy. However, the ancient sources discussing the affair do appear to be discussing a specific poem by Sappho with which they were familiar. At least one fragment of Sappho's poetry, Sappho 15, apparently includes the name "Doricha".

Ancient sources differ on the name for Charaxos' lover. The earliest surviving source to discuss the story is Herodotus, who calls her Rhodopis; Strabo, Photius and the Suda all also call her Rhodopis but note that Sappho called her Doricha. On the other hand, Athenaeus claims that Doricha and Rhodopis were different people, and that Charaxos' lover was Doricha. In an epigram addressed to Charaxos' lover, Posidippus calls her Doricha. Doricha and Rhodopis were both personal names that might also have been nicknames, Rhodopis meaning "rosy-faced" and Doricha deriving either from Doris ("Dorian") or doron ("gift"). (Note: Maria Kazanskaya interprets the name as "little Dorian". Renate Schlesier translates it as "she who yearns for gifts" Richard P. Martin gives both possibilities, suggesting either "the Dorian woman" or "she who gives herself freely".) Modern scholars generally assume that Doricha and Rhodopis were the same person, and that Doricha was her birth name while Rhodopis was a nickname or professional moniker.

== Reception ==
Rhodopis c. 1868, by George Frederic Watts

The story of Rhodopis was retold by William Morris in his epic poem The Earthly Paradise. In the nineteenth century she was depicted in the visual arts by the painters George Frederic Watts, Charles Landseer, and Edward Poynter, and the sculptors Charles Francis Fuller and Harry Bates. The stories of Rhodopis' love for Aesop, and of her marriage to Psammetichus, were the subject of a 1780 novella, The History and Amours of Rhodope. Rhodopis' love for Aesop also inspired a painting by Angelika Kauffmann, and the television film Aesop and Rhodope (1953).

== Works cited ==
- Baumbach, Manuel (2016). "Aesop". Brill's New Pauly Supplements II Online – Volume 7. doi:10.1163/2468-3418_bnps7_SIM_004520.
- Bing, Peter (2018). "Tombs of Poets' Minor Characters". In Goldschmidt, Nora; Graziosi, Barbara (eds.). Tombs of the Ancient Poets: Between Literary Reception and Material Culture. Oxford: Oxford University Press. ISBN 9780198826477.
- Felton, Debbie (2021). "Introduction: Ancient Analogues for Modern Tales". In Felton, Debbie (ed.). A Cultural History of Fairy Tales in Antiquity. London: Bloomsbury Publishing. ISBN 978-1-3500-9379-9.
- Hennard Dutheil de la Rochère, Martine; Lathey, Gillian; Woźniak, Monika, eds. (2016). Cinderella across cultures: new directions and interdisciplinary perspectives. Detroit: Wayne State University Press. ISBN 9780814341568.
- Kapparis, Konstantinos (2018). Prostitution in the Ancient Greek World. Berlin: De Gruyter. ISBN 9783110557954.
- Kazanskaya, Maria (2020). "Indirect Transmission on Sappho's kertomia". In Currie, Bruno; Rutherford, Ian (eds.). The Reception of Greek Lyric Poetry in the Ancient World: Transmission, Canonization and Paratext. Leiden: Brill. ISBN 978-90-04-41452-5.
- Keesling, Catherine (2006). "Heavenly Bodies: Monuments to Prostitutes in Greek Sanctuaries". In Faraone, Christopher; McClure, Laura (eds.). Prostitutes and Courtesans in the Ancient World. Madison: University of Wisconsin Press. pp. 59–76. ISBN 0299213102.
- Kivilo, Maarit (2010). Early Greek Poets' Lives: The Shaping of the Tradition. Leiden: Brill. ISBN 978-90-04-19328-4.
- Lelli, Emanuele (2021). "Adaptation: Transmission, Translation, and Diffusion of Ancient Tales". In Felton, Debbie (ed.). A Cultural History of Fairy Tales in Antiquity. London: Bloomsbury Publishing. ISBN 978-1-3500-9379-9.
- Lidov, Joel (2002). "Sappho, Herodotus and the Hetaira". Classical Philology. 97 (3): 203–237. doi:10.1086/449585. JSTOR 1215522. S2CID 161865691.
- Martin, Richard P. (2016). "Sappho, Iambist: Abusing the Brother". In Bierl, Anton; Lardinois, André (eds.). The Newest Sappho: P. Sapph. Obbink and P. GC inv. 105, frs.1–4. Leiden: Brill. ISBN 978-90-04-31483-2.
- McClure, Laura (2003). Courtesans at Table: Gender and Greek Literary Culture in Athenaeus. New York: Routledge. ISBN 0-415-93946-1.
- Mebius, Eva-Charlotta. "Rhodopis". Watts Gallery Artists' Village.
- Nagy, Gregory (2015). "Herodotus and a courtesan from Naucratis". Classical Inquiries.
- Raaflaub, Kurt (2016). "The Newest Sappho and Archaic Greek–Near Eastern Interactions". In Bierl, Anton; Lardinois, André (eds.). The Newest Sappho: P. Sapph. Obbink and P. GC inv. 105, frs.1–4. Leiden: Brill. pp. 302–336. ISBN 978-90-04-31483-2.
- Schlesier, Renate (2013). "Atthis, Gyrinno, And Other Hetairai: Female Personal Names in Sappho's Poetry". Philologus. 157 (2). doi:10.1515/phil.2013.0017.
- Yatromanolakis, Dimitrios (2007). Sappho in the Making: the Early Reception. Cambridge: Harvard University Press. ISBN 978-0-674-02686-5.
