= Abrotonum =

Abrotonum (Ancient Greek: Ἀβρότονον) Abrotonon, pronounced Avrotonon can refer to:

- Abrotonon, 6th-century BC was a Thracian, the mother of Themistocles. There is an epigram preserved Book VII of Anthologia Palatina (Epitaphs): "Αβρότονον Θρύϊσσα γυνή πέλον· αλλά τεκέσθαι τον μέγαν Έλλησιν φημί Θεμιστοκλέα" ("Avrotonon, Thracian woman she was, but she gave birth to the great Greek which we call Themistocles").
- Abrotonon, the name of a hetaera. Plutarch refers to an Abrotonon from Thrace in his Erotikos (Ἐρωτικός). In the first dialogue of Dialogues of the Courtesans of Lucian the name of an hetaera named Abrotonon is also mentioned.
- Abrotonum, a plant of this name is mentioned from Pliny the Elder in his work Natural History
- Abrotonum, a Phoenician city on the coast of North Africa, in the district of Tripolitana, between the Syrtes, usually identified with Sabratha though Pliny makes them different places.
