= Berge (Bisaltia) =

Coordinates: 40°54′40″N 23°30′30″E

Berge or Berga (Ancient Greek: Βέργη or Βέργα) was a Greek town of ancient Macedonia, in what is now the Serres regional unit in northern Greece.

The town was located inland from the mouth of the Strymon, in the region of Bisaltia, north-west of Amphipolis, and was founded by Thasians as a dependent colony and emporion sometime in the 5th century BCE. The town was a member of the Delian League, and according to N. G. L. Hammond was colonized by 1000 Athenians. Later sources call it a polis, but according to Strabo it was a village of the Bisaltae and Ptolemy writes that it was in the territory of the Odomanti.

Berge was a rich city that minted her own coins from 476 to 356 BCE depicting Silenus with a nymph or Silenus or a carp fish or square crisscross in form of swastikas and had the following words inscribed, (ΒΕΡΓ) or (ΒΕΡΓΑΙ) or (ΒΕΡΓΑΙΟΥ). Berge began to lose its importance after the foundation of Amphipolis, it continued however being a self-sufficient city in Hellenistic and Roman times.

It was the homeland of Antiphanes of Berge (4th century BCE), writer of the book Apista (Unbelievable Stories), from which the verb bergaḯzein (Greek: βεργαΐζειν) was created to denote someone telling incredible stories.

Its site is located about 1 mile (1.6 km) northeast of modern Nigrita.

== See also ==
- Bergaios
- List of ancient Greek cities
