= Venus and Amor =

Painting by Hans Holbein the Younger

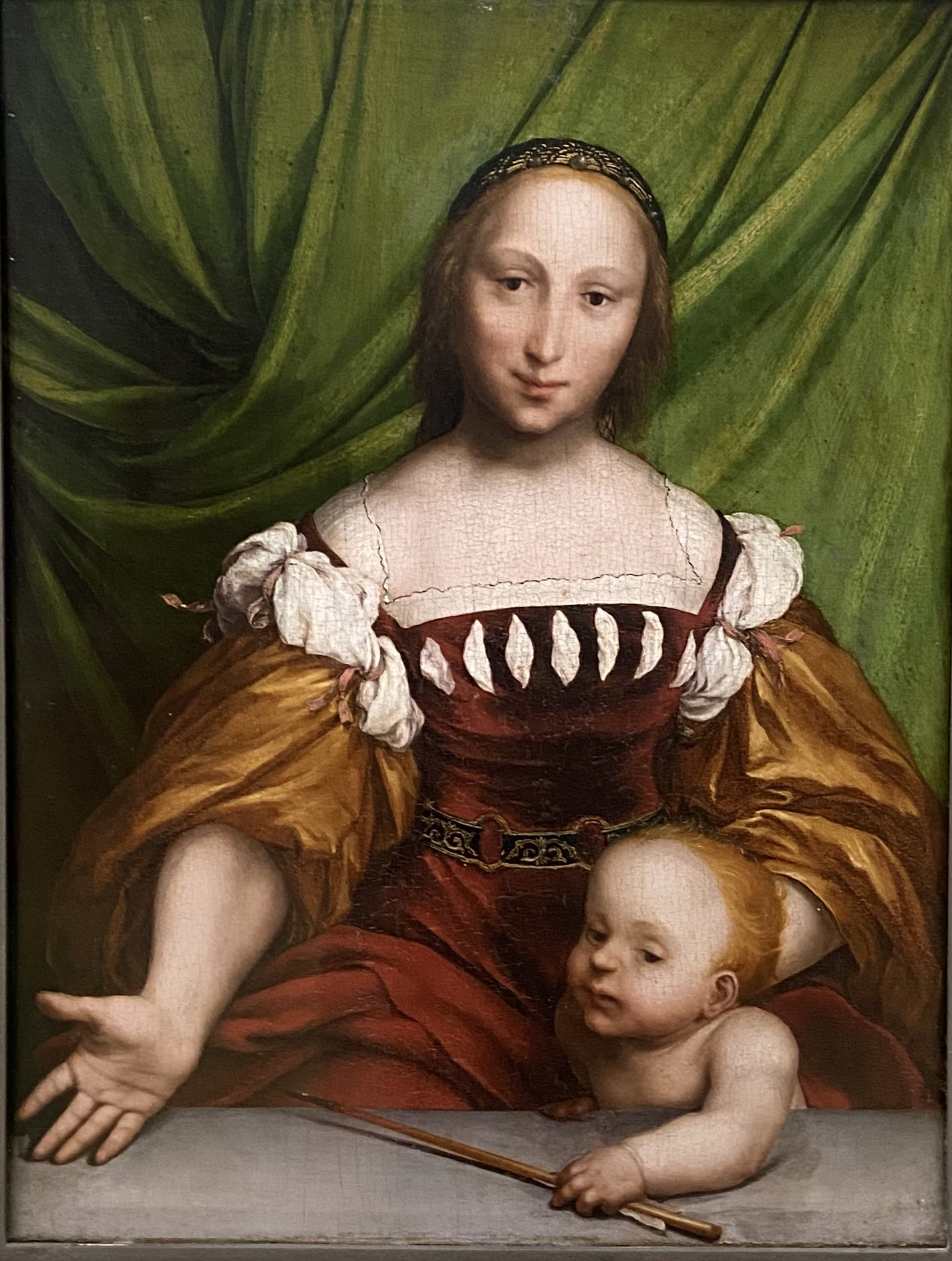
- Artist: Venus Painter
- Year: between 1526–1528
- Type: Oil and tempera on limewood
- Dimensions: 34.5 cm × 26 cm (13.6 in × 10 in)
- Location: Öffentliche Kunstsammlung, Basel

Venus and Amor (also known as Venus and Cupid) is painting by Hans Holbein the Youngers workshop and is the collection of the Kunstmuseum Basel, Switzerland. It was assumed for a long time to be painting by Hans Holbein the Younger, but research showed that this could not be possible. It was discovered that the painter had used a sort of carbon paper with the contours of the already existing Laïs and used it to transfer those contours in reverse on the new portrait he was to paint of Venus.

As the portrait is dated 1526, the year of Holbein's departure from Basel, it is assumed that it was painted between 1526 and 1528, the years Holbein stayed in London. The painting depicts the Roman goddess of love, Venus, with her son Amor (Cupid) and the model is believed to be either Magdalena Offenburg or her daughter Dorothea. They are shown in front of a large hanging green curtain and behind a low parapet. Venus is depicted with an open gesture and sincere gaze. Cupid is seen climbing onto the parapet while holding love's arrow in his left hand. He has red-orange hair, rendered in the same colouring and tone of the rich cloth sleeves covering his mother's upper arms.

Such influences can be seen in the gesture of Venus, whose pose closely echoes that of Jesus in Leonardo's 1498 Last Supper. In addition, her long, oval, idealised face seems closely modelled on Leonardo's depictions of the Virgin Mary.

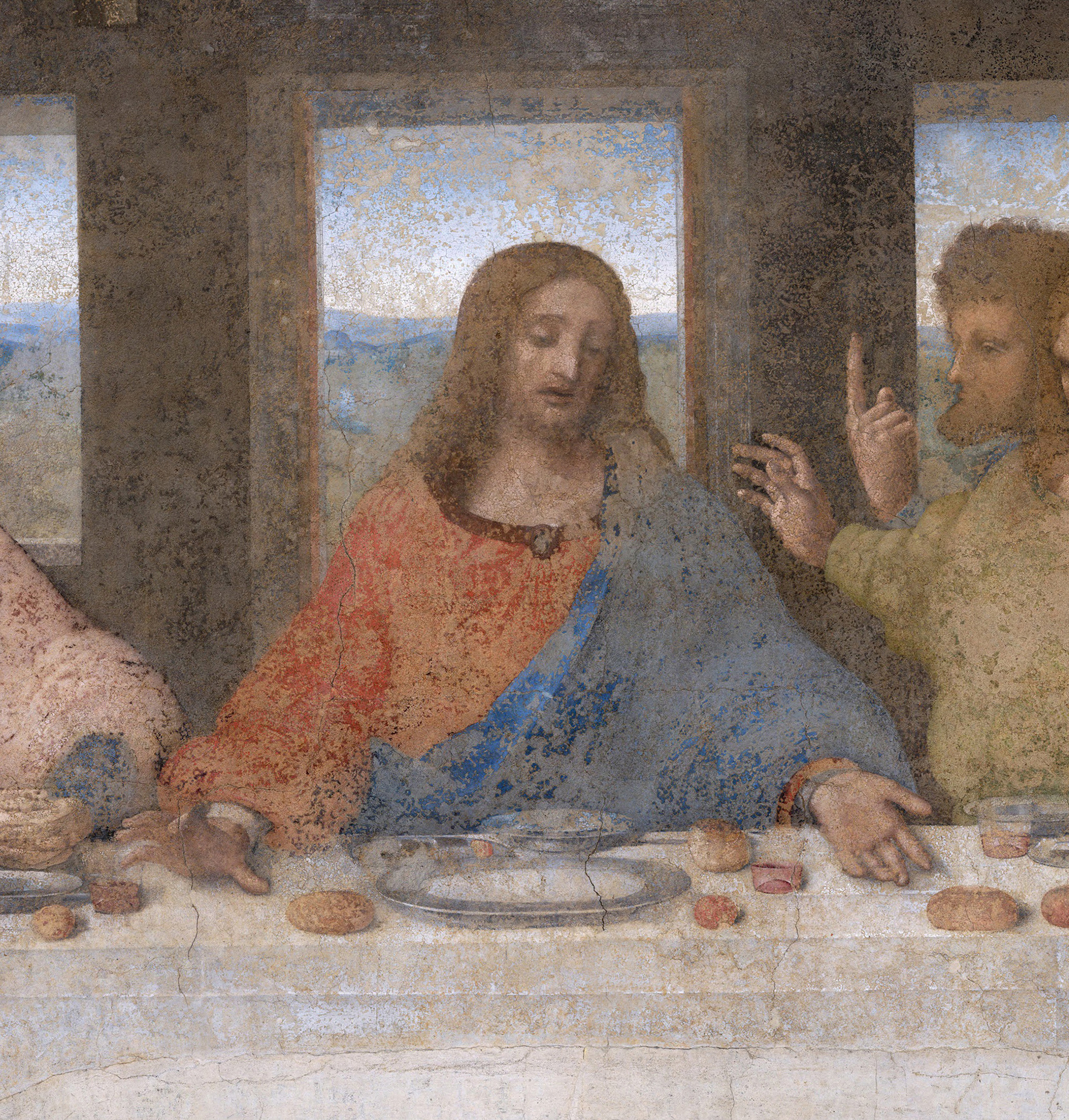
Detail of the Last Supper, Leonardo da Vinci, 1498. The extended hand and tilted head of Venus echo those of Jesus in da Vinci's work

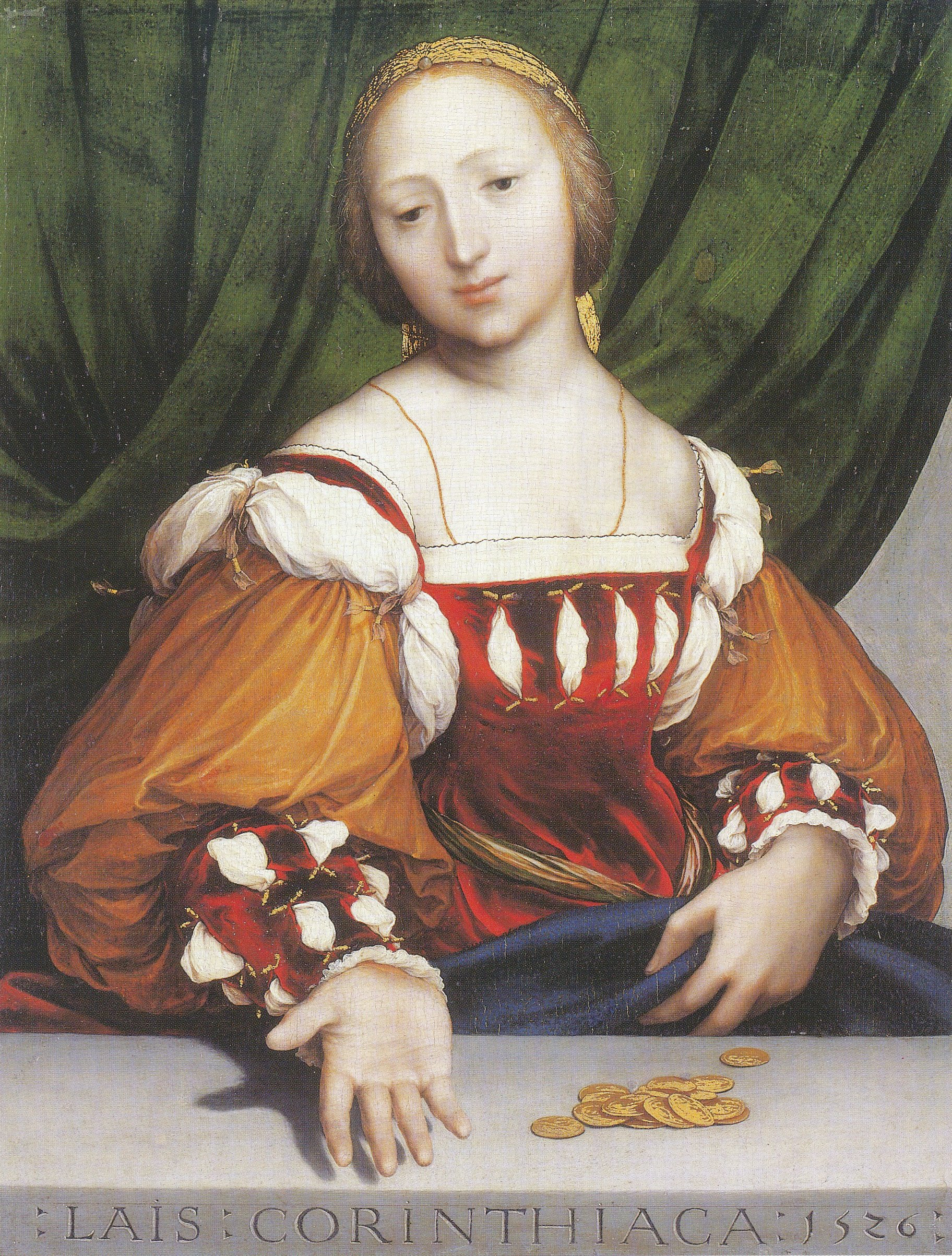
Lais of Corinth, 1526, also posed by Magdalena Offenburg.

Leonardesque portrait painting was very popular across northern Europe during the 1520s, and it is generally believed that a number of Holbein's works were direct attempts to gain favour from potential wealthy patrons. The art historians Oskar Bätschmann and Pascal Griener wrote in 1999 that, as with the artist's similar Lais of Corinth, Venus' open hand is "stretched towards the beholder and prospective collector."

The work was first mentioned after it came into the possession of the collector Basilius Amerbach in 1578 as a gift from his cousin, Franz Rechburger. Amerbach's inventory records that it began as a portrait of a lady from the Offenburg family, however, this claim has not been substantiated by art historians.

== Sources ==
- Batschmann, Oskar & Griener, Pascal. Hans Holbein. Reaktion Books, 1999. ISBN 1-86189-040-0
- Toman, Rolf (ed). Renaissance: Art and Architecture in Europe during the 15th and 16th Centuries. Bath: Parragon, 2009. ISBN 978-1-4075-5238-5
