= Archeanassa =

Ancient Greek courtesan

Archeanassa or Archaeanassa (Greek Ἀρχεάνασσα, Ἀρχαιάνασσα), a native of Colophon, was a hetaera or courtesan living in Athens in the late 5th century BC. According to biographical sources about Plato, the philosopher as a young man was deeply in love with Archeanassa and addressed a four-line epigram to her. The poem is quoted by Athenaeus in a survey of famous courtesans, and by Diogenes Laërtius in his biography of Plato:

I have a mistress, fair Archeanassa of Colophon, on whose very wrinkles sits hot love. O hapless ye who met such beauty on its first voyage, what a flame must have been kindled in you!

A similar poem is found in the Byzantine compilation called Anthologia Palatina. In that source, although it is still addressed to Archeanassa, its authorship is attributed not to Plato but to Asclepiades.

I hold Archeanassa the courtesan from Colophon even on whose wrinkles sweet Love sat. Ah, ye lovers, who plucked the fresh flowers of her youth in its first piercing brilliance, through what a fiery furnace did you pass!

Modern scholars tend to accept the attribution to Plato as valid.
