= Milan Papyrus =

The Milan Papyrus is a papyrus roll inscribed in Alexandria in the late 3rd or early 2nd century BC during the rule of the Ptolemaic dynasty. It contains examples of Greek poetry by Posidippus of Pella (c. 270 BC). It is currently held by the University of Milan (inventory no. 1295 R), and it is also known in scholarship under its label P.Mil.Vogl. VIII 309.

== History ==
Originally discovered by anonymous tomb raiders as part of a mummy wrapping, it was purchased in the papyrus "grey market" in Europe in 1992 by the University of Milan.

As the earliest surviving example of a Greek poetry book as well as the largest addition to the corpus of classical Greek poetry in many years, the story of its discovery was covered by The New York Times and National Geographic.

Labelled the "Milan Papyrus," it was published in a scholarly edition in 2001, edited by Guido Bastianini, Claudio Gallazzi, and Colin Austin, with contributions by other scholars. The edition included the complete transcription of the recto of the papyrus, with commentary and high-quality facsimiles of the whole roll.

In 2002, Austin and Bastianini published a comprehensive, smaller edition, Posidippi Pellaei quae supersunt omnia, "all the surviving works of Posidippus of Pella", including the epigrams of the papyrus, the epigrams known through Tzetzes and other epigrams transmitted by the Palatine Anthology, with Italian and English translations.

Scholars have been eager to examine this new literary source, created in a major center of Hellenistic culture. Academic discussion on the roll includes a "standing-room only" discussion at the American Philological Association annual meeting in January 2001, a seminar on the Milan Papyrus at Harvard's Center for Hellenic Studies in April 2002, and international conferences at Milan, Florence and Cincinnati, in November 2002.

In 2007, Harvard University reported that scholarly work on the Milan Papyrus, on Posidippus, and on the Alexandrian literary epigram in general, was invigorated by the discovery.

== Description & contents ==
Over six hundred previously unknown lines of Greek poetry are on the roll, representing about 112 brief poems, or epigrams. Two of these were already known and had been attributed by the 12th-century AD Byzantine scholar John Tzetzes to the Hellenistic epigrammatist Posidippus of Pella (c. 310 – c. 240 BC), a Macedonian who spent his literary career in Alexandria. The initial reaction has been to attribute all the new lines to Posidippus, though Franco Ferrari suggests that there is evidence the manuscript is an anthology, in which Posidippus' epigrams predominated.

In addition to the epigrams, which are written on the recto (i.e., the inner surface of the roll), the papyrus also bears a mythological text in Greek, heavily damaged, which was written on the verso (the outer surface) and, as of 2023, is still unpublished.

In terms of the date, one source suggests that "One side contains approximately 600 lines of verse in a hand that has been dated to c. 230-200 BCE. The other side has some mythological material which dates to the early 2nd century BCE." Another says "All sixteen columns of P.Mil.Vogl. VIII 309 are written in a style dating back to ca. 220 BC".

== See also ==
- List of ancient Egyptian papyri
