= Guido Bastianini =

Italian papyrologist (1945–2025)

Guido Bastianini (10 September 1945 – 18 November 2025) was an Italian papyrologist and palaeographer.

== Life and career ==
Bastianini was born in Florence on 10 September 1945. He completed his papyrological studies in Florence in 1970.

He took part in various archaeological missions in Egypt organized by the Istituto Papirologico "G. Vitelli" and the Egyptian Museum in Cairo (March–April 1969, September–October 1972, April 1973), both on the excavation of Antinoe (September–October 1973, December 1974 – January 1975).

His appointment as Lecturer in Papyrology at the University of Florence (1981) was immediately followed by the appointment as Full Professor of Papyrology at the University of Milan (same 1981), where he also directed the Papyrological Institute of the same university and served as President of the council of the Faculty of Humanities ("Corso di Laurea in Lettere"). In Milan Bastianini, together with Claudio Gallazzi (then Associate Professor of Greek Paleography), studied the papyri held by the University collection and published several studies concerning papyrology and the history of the discipline; in these years, he examined, revised and published several papyri held by various collections.

He returned to Florence in 1998 and in 1999 he became director of Istituto Papirologico "G. Vitelli" until 2016. From 2001 to 2007 was president of the Italian Institute for the Egyptian civilization. He was vice-president of the International Association of Papyrologues (2007-2013) and honorary president. In 2015 he retired and was nominated Emeritus. During his teaching career, he also was involved in university administration, both in Milan and in Florence.

With Claudio Gallazzi (University of Milan) he edited the Milan Papyrus (P.Mil.Vogl. VIII 309) known as Posidippus' papyrus; with other scholars he edited two volumes (XV and XVI) of the Papiri della Società Italiana (PSI)—the first two appeared since 1957.

Bastianini died in Florence on 18 November 2025, at the age of 80.

== Selected works ==
- G. Bastianini - J. Whitehorne, Strategi and Royal Scribes of Roman Egypt, Firenze, Gonnelli 1987 (Papyrologica Florentina XV).
- Bastianini G. - Gallazzi C. (edd.), Papiri dell’Università di Milano - Posidippo di Pella. Epigrammi, LED Edizioni Universitarie, Milano, 2001, ISBN 88-7916-165-2.
- Austin C. - Bastianini G. (edd.), Posidippi Pellaei quae supersunt omnia, LED Edizioni Universitarie, Milano, 2002, ISBN 88-7916-193-8.
- Commentaria et Lexica Graeca in Papyris reperta (CLGP) ediderunt G. Bastianini, M. Haslam, H. Maehler, F. Montanari, C. Römer, adiuvante M. Stroppa, Pars I. Commentaria et Lexica in Auctores, Vol. 1. Fasc. 1: Aeschines-Alcaeus. K. G. Saur, München-Leipzig, 2004.
- Commentaria et Lexica Greca in Papyris reperta (CLGP) ediderunt G. Bastianini, M. Haslam, H. Maehler, F. Montanari, C. Römer, adiuvante M. Stroppa, I.1.4 (Aristophanes-Bacchylides). K. G. Saur, München-Leipzig, 2006.
- Bartoletti, V.† - Bastianini, G. - Messeri, G. - Montanari, F. - Pintaudi, R.] (edd.), "Papiri greci e latini. Volume quindicesimo, ni. 1453-1574"|serie=Pubblicazioni della Società Italiana per la ricerca dei Papiri greci e latini in Egitto - Istituto Papirologico "G. Vitelli, Firenze, 2008, ISBN 978-88-87829-37-2.
- Bastianini, G. - Maltomini, Fca. - Gabriella Messeri (edd.), "Papiri della Società Italiana. Volume sedicesimo (PSI XVI), ni. 1575-1653", Edizioni dell'Istituto Papirologico "G. Vitelli", 1) - Firenze University Press, Firenze, 2013, ISBN 978-88-6655-382-3.
