= Nikarete of Corinth =

5th/4th-century BC Corinthian madam

Nikarete was a madam from Corinth, who lived in the 5th and 4th century BC.

Nikarete operated a "bettering" establishment in Corinth, a city famous in antiquity for its prostitution trade. From Corinth and Greek literature comes the verb korinthiazein, which loosely translated means "to fornicate".

Nikarete is said to be a freedwoman, who was previously owned by a man called Charisios. When she gained her freedom, she married Charisios' cook and moved to Corinth. Nikarete bought young girls from the Corinthian slave market and trained them as hetaera, to let them make their own living. According to Apollodorus, it was her custom to rent out her hetaeras during their prime, then sold them off, which implied a 100-percent manumission rate. Apollodorus names seven girls bought by Nikarete, of whom three, Neaira, Metaneira, and Anteia, were all famous.

Through a kind of parental relationship Nikarete sought to increase the price her customers had to pay (free women were usually higher in demand). Nikarete's most famous hetaera Neaira, for instance, whom she bought along with six other girls was marketed as her own daughter so that she commanded higher prices.
