= Posidippus (epigrammatic poet) =

Greek epigrammatist and poet (c.310–c.240 BC)

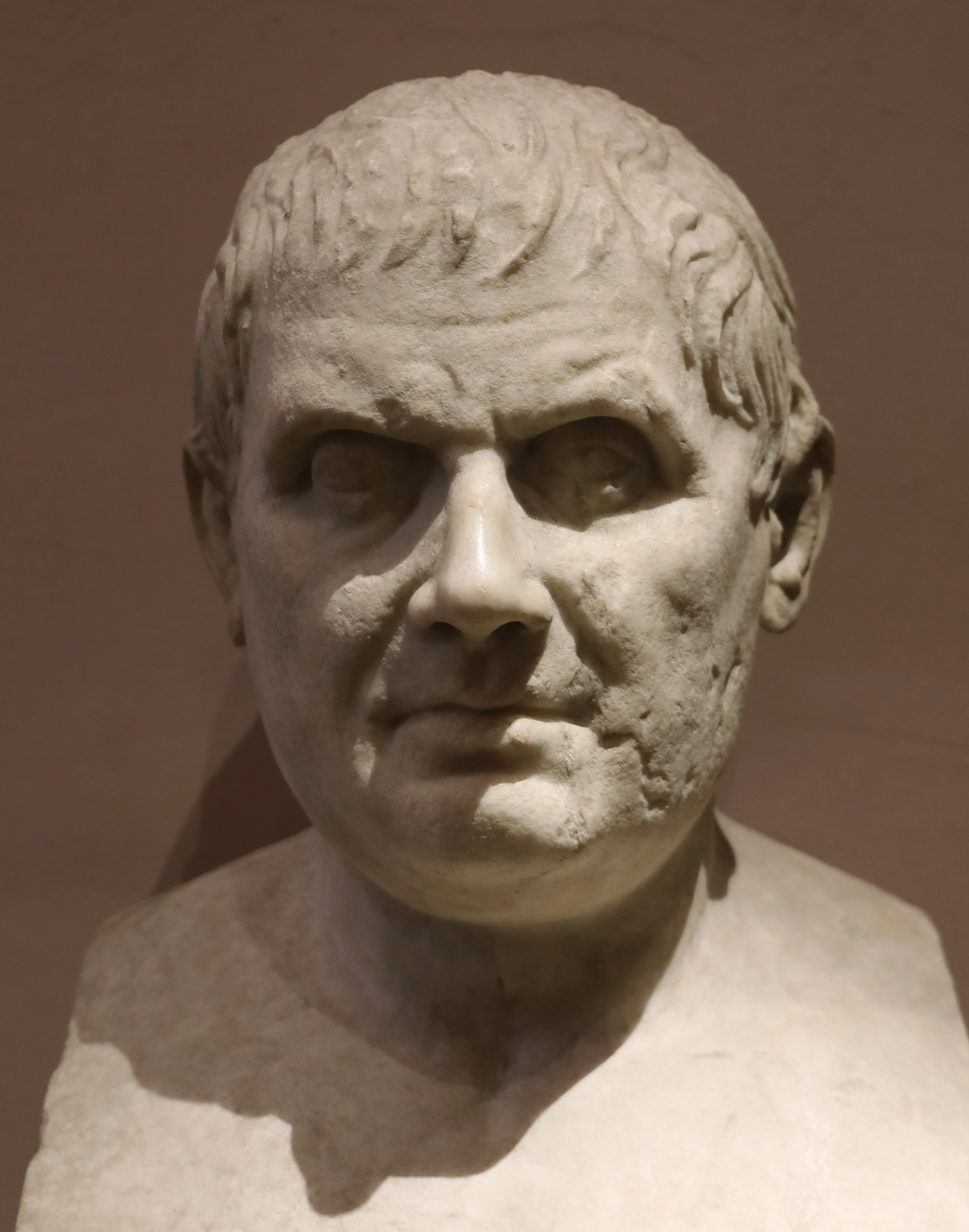
Posidippus (epigrammatic poet)

Posidippus of Pella (Ancient Greek: Ποσείδιππος Poseidippos; c. 310 – c. 240 BC) was an Ancient Greek epigrammatic poet.

== Life ==
Posidippus, the son of Admetos, was born in Pella, capital city of the kingdom of Macedon. He lived for some time in Samos before moving permanently to the court of Ptolemy I Soter and later Ptolemy II Philadelphus in Alexandria, Egypt. An inscription from Thermon in Aetolia records that he was honoured by the Aetolian League in about 264/3 BC. He was friends with the poets Asclepiades of Samos and Hedylus.

== Poetry ==
Twenty-three of Posidippus' poems were included in the Greek Anthology, and several more were quoted in either part or whole by Athenaeus of Naucratis in his Deipnosophistae. Until 2001, based on these remains, it was assumed that Posidippus wrote only about drinking and love. In that year the Milan Papyrus P.Mil.Vogl. VIII 309 was published after being recovered in 1992 from the wrappings of an Egyptian mummy dating to about 180 BC. It contained 112 poems, two of which were previously known to have been written by Posidippus, which address subjects that include events of the court of the Ptolemaic dynasty, gemstones, and bird divination. Because of Posidippus' authorship of these two poems, scholars have concluded that the other poems of the Milan Papyrus were also written by him.

The poems of the Milan Papyrus are grouped into sections, and the papyrus largely preserves the section headers for the surviving poems:

When Zeno was about to enjoy a peaceful sleep
after being blind for twenty-five years,
he recovered his sight at the age of eighty, but [after glimpsing]
the sun twice only, he saw grievous Hades.

— Posidippus 100 (Austin-Bastianini)
1. On Stones (Lithika [title restored from two partially preserved letters], poems 1-20)
2. On Omens (Oionoskopika, 21-35)
3. Dedications (Anathematika, 36-41)
4. Epitaphs (Epitumbia [conjecture: title not preserved], 42-61)
5. On Statues (Andriantopoiika, 62-70)
6. On Equestrian Victories (Hippika, 71-88)
7. On Shipwrecks (Nauagika, 89-94)
8. On Cures (Iamatika, 95-101)
9. Characters (Tropoi, 102-109)
10. [title lost] (110-112)

== Editions ==
- Posidippus' Milan Papyrus poetry book: Greek text and English translation (PDF) by various hands (CHS)
- Bastianini G. - Gallazzi C. (edd.), Papiri dell’Università di Milano - Posidippo di Pella. Epigrammi, LED Edizioni Universitarie, Milano, 2001, ISBN 88-7916-165-2
- Austin C. - Bastianini G. (edd.), Posidippi Pellaei quae supersunt omnia , LED Edizioni Universitarie, Milano, 2002, ISBN 88-7916-193-8
