= La Sainte Courtisane =

Unfinished play by Oscar Wilde

- Written by: Oscar Wilde
- Original language: English
- Genre: religious, historical, Symbolist

La Sainte Courtisane (pronounced [la sɛ̃t kuʁ.ti.zan], French for "The Holy Courtesan") is an unfinished play by Oscar Wilde written in 1894. The original draft was left in a taxi cab by the author, and was never completed. It was first published in 1908 by Wilde's literary executor, Robert Ross. It has never been performed, and has been little studied.

== Summary ==
=== Dramatis Personae ===
- Myrrhina, a rich temptress and the "Courtisane" of the title
- Honorius, a hermit of the desert who will not look at women
- First and Second Man, who talk to Myrrhina, provide exposition about Honorius and talk of the gods they have seen.

=== Synopsis ===
The play is incomplete. The plot of the existing segment is as follows: Myrrhina is an Alexandrian noblewoman who travels to the mountains to tempt Honorius, a Christian hermit, away from goodness with her beauty and wealth. After they talk, he decides to return to sin in Alexandria while she discovers religion and chooses to remain in the desert.

Robbie Ross summarises the complete plot in his introduction to Miscellanies:

"Honorius the hermit, so far as I recollect the story, falls in love with the courtesan who has come to tempt him, and he reveals to her the secret of the Love of God. She immediately becomes a Christian, and is murdered by robbers; Honorius the hermit goes back to Alexandria to pursue a life of pleasure."

== History ==
Oscar Wilde began work on the play in 1894, between writing Salome and The Importance of Being Earnest, but did not complete it before his trial and imprisonment. The fragments were first published in 1908 in Methuen's Collected Works, along with an introduction by Robbie Ross which explained its intervening history:

"At the time of Wilde’s trial the nearly completed drama was entrusted to Mrs. Leverson, who in 1897 went to Paris on purpose to restore it to the author. Wilde immediately left the manuscript in a cab...All my attempts to recover the lost work failed. The passages here reprinted are from some odd leaves of a first draft. The play is of course not unlike Salome, though it was written in English. It expanded Wilde’s favourite theory that when you convert some one to an idea, you lose your faith in it; the same motive runs through Mr. W. H."

Wilde considered revisiting the play in 1897 after his release from prison, but he lacked motivation for literary work in this period.

== Reception ==
Wilde's own opinion of the play changed over time. During his imprisonment, it was much on his mind, describing it as one among his "beautiful coloured, musical things". However, Ross describes his changed mood after his release:

"A few days later he laughingly informed me of the loss, and added that a cab was a very proper place for it. I have explained elsewhere that he looked on his plays with disdain in his last years, though he was always full of schemes for writing others."

Biographer Richard Ellmann identifies a similarity to Anatole France's novel Thaïs; Rita Severi also suggests Saint Pelagia, Saint Mary the Egyptian, Mary Magdalen and the Queen of Sheba as models for Myrrhina, and the Indian legend of Barlaam and Josaphat as inspiration for the plot.

Severi has compared the exploration of the spiritual and sensual life to a similar thread running throughout The Picture of Dorian Gray, Salome and The Fisherman and His Soul, identifying it as part of "Wilde’s Parisian, Symbolist phase":

"La Sainte Courtisane is neither a comedy nor a parody. It contains all the elements of the Symbolist Mystery play: symbolic characters that embody ethical, philosophical, spiritual ideas; one main action (drama) that unfolds in three macro-sequences or tableaux and around which the whole play revolves, in some unidentified space (the desert) and time (a timeless past); highly metaphoric, repetitive language that reverberates in the rhythmic dialogue like a music of words or, as Wilde had said of the language of Salomé, like the sound of a pearl that falls on a silver basin. Elaborate speech patterns that unfold a double meaning, an allegory."

Christopher S. Nassaar described the play as "a minor jeux d’esprit", and places it in context as a "bridge" between Salome and The Importance of Being Earnest.

Rudolf Wagner-Régeny set the fragments to music in 1930 for 4 speakers and chamber orchestra.

== See also ==
- Music based on the works of Oscar Wilde
- Unfinished creative work

== Sources ==
- Ellerman, Richard. Oscar Wilde. Penguin Books, 1987,
