= Epigenes of Athens =

Epigenes of Athens (Ancient Greek: Ἐπιγένης ὁ Ἀθηναῖος, c. 4th century BC) was an Athenian comic poet of the Middle Comedy.

Pollux indeed speaks of him as neôn tis kômikôn, but the terms "middle" and "new," as Clinton remarks, are not always very carefully applied. Epigenes himself, in a fragment of his play called The Little Tomb (Mnêmation) speaks of Pixodarus, prince of Caria, as "the king's son"; and from this Meineke argues that the comedy in question must have been written while Hecatomnus, the father of Pixodarus, was yet alive, and perhaps about 380 BC. We find besides in Athenaeus, that there was a doubt among the ancients whether the play called Disappearance of the Money (Argyrion Aphanismos) should be assigned to Epigenes or Antiphanes. These poets therefore must have been contemporaries. The Suda mentions two other plays written by Epigenes: Heroine and Revelry.

The fragments of the comedies of Epigenes have been collected by Meineke and Kock.
