= Alciphron =

Ancient Greek writer

Alciphron (Ancient Greek: Ἀλκίφρων) was an ancient Greek sophist, and the most eminent among the Greek epistolographers. We possess no direct information at all regarding his life or the age in which he lived.

== Works ==
Under the name of Alciphron, we possess 116 fictional letters, in 3 books. Their objective is to delineate the characters of certain classes of men, by introducing them as expressing their peculiar sentiments and opinions, upon subjects with which they were familiar. The classes are fishermen, country people, parasites, and hetaerae or Athenian courtesans. All are made to express their sentiments in the most graceful and elegant language, even where the subjects are of a low or obscene kind. The characters are thus somewhat raised above their common standard, without any great violation of the truth of reality.

The language is the Attic dialect, which was spoken in familiar but refined conversation in Athens, even though the imaginary writers are country people, fishermen, parasites and courtesans. The city from which the letters are dated is, with a few exceptions, Athens and its vicinity; and the time, wherever it is discernible, is the period after the reign of Alexander the Great. The Attic New Comedy was the principal source where the author derived his information respecting the characters and manners which he describes, and for this reason, these letters contain valuable information about the private life of the Athenians of that time.

It has been said that Alciphron was an imitator of Lucian; but besides the style, and, in a few instances, the subject matter, there is no resemblance between the two writers: the spirit in which the two treat their subjects is totally different. Both derived their materials from the same sources, and in style both aimed at the greatest perfection of the genuine Attic Greek. Classical scholar Stephan Bergler has remarked that Alciphron stands in the same relation to Menander as Lucian to Aristophanes.

== Date ==
Some earlier critics placed him, without any plausible reason, in the 5th century BC. The classical scholar Stephan Bergler, and others who followed him, placed Alciphron in the period between Lucian and Aristaenetus, that is, between 170 and 350 AD, while others again assign to him a date even earlier than the time of Lucian. Among the letters of Aristaenetus there are two between Lucian and Alciphron; and it has been inferred that Alciphron was a contemporary of Lucian.

== Editions ==
The first edition of Alciphron's letters is that of Italian printer Aldus Manutius, in his collection of the Greek Epistolographers, Venice, 1499, 4to. This edition, however, contains only those letters which, in more modern editions, form the first two books. Seventy-two new letters were added from a Vienna and a Vatican manuscript by Stephan Bergler, in his edition (Leipzig, 1715, 8vo.) with notes and a Latin translation. These seventy-two epistles form the third book in Bergler's edition. J. A. Wagner, in his edition (Leipzig, 1798, 2 vols, 8vo.), with the notes of Bergler), added two new letters entire, and fragments of five others. One long letter, which as of the 19th century had not been published entire in English, exists in several Paris manuscripts.

- Editio princeps, Aldus Manutius, (44 letters) (1499)
- Stephan Bergler (1715)
- English translation by Monro and Beloe (1791)
- E. E. Seiler (1856)
- Rudolf Hercher (1873)
- Athenian Society 1896
- Schepers (1905).
- Granholm (diss.; 2012)
