= Hetaira =

Type of female companion in Ancient Greece

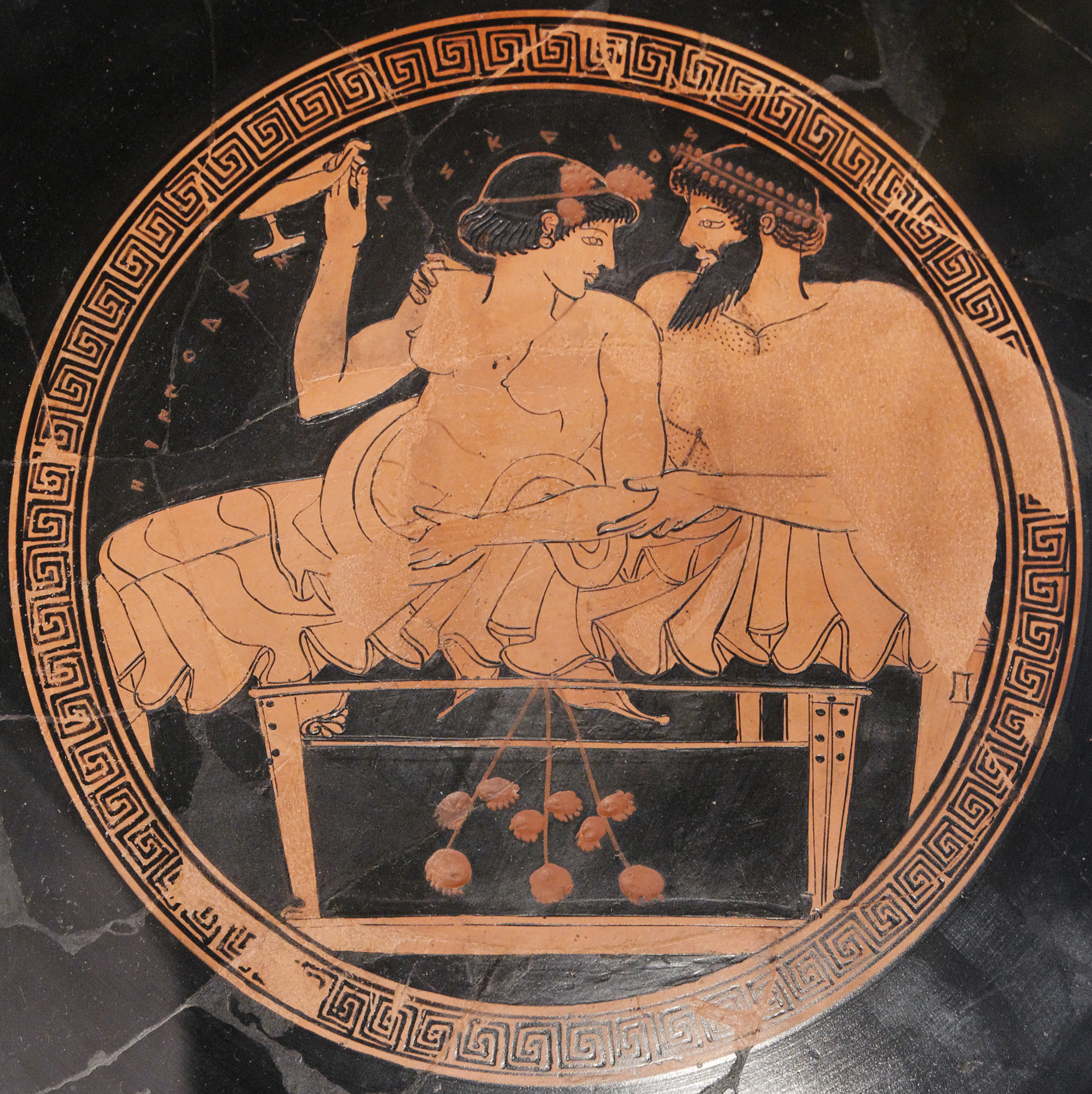
Greek hetaira and her client on a couch, approx. 430 BC. Wives were not allowed into the symposium.

A hetaira (/hɪˈtaɪrə/; Ancient Greek: ἑταίρα, lit. 'female companion'; pl.. ἑταῖραι hetairai, English: /hɪˈtaɪraɪ/), Latinized as hetaera (/hɪˈtɪrə/, pl. hetaerae, English: /hɪˈtɪri/), was a highly educated female companion in ancient Greece who served as an artist, entertainer, and conversationalist. Historians have often classed them as courtesans, but the extent to which they were sex workers is a matter of dispute.

Custom excluded the wives and daughters of Athenian citizens from the symposium, but this prohibition did not extend to hetairai, who were often foreign-born and could be well-versed in the arts, philosophy and culture. Other female entertainers might appear in the otherwise male domain but hetairai actively participated in conversations, including intellectual and literary discourse.

== Summary ==
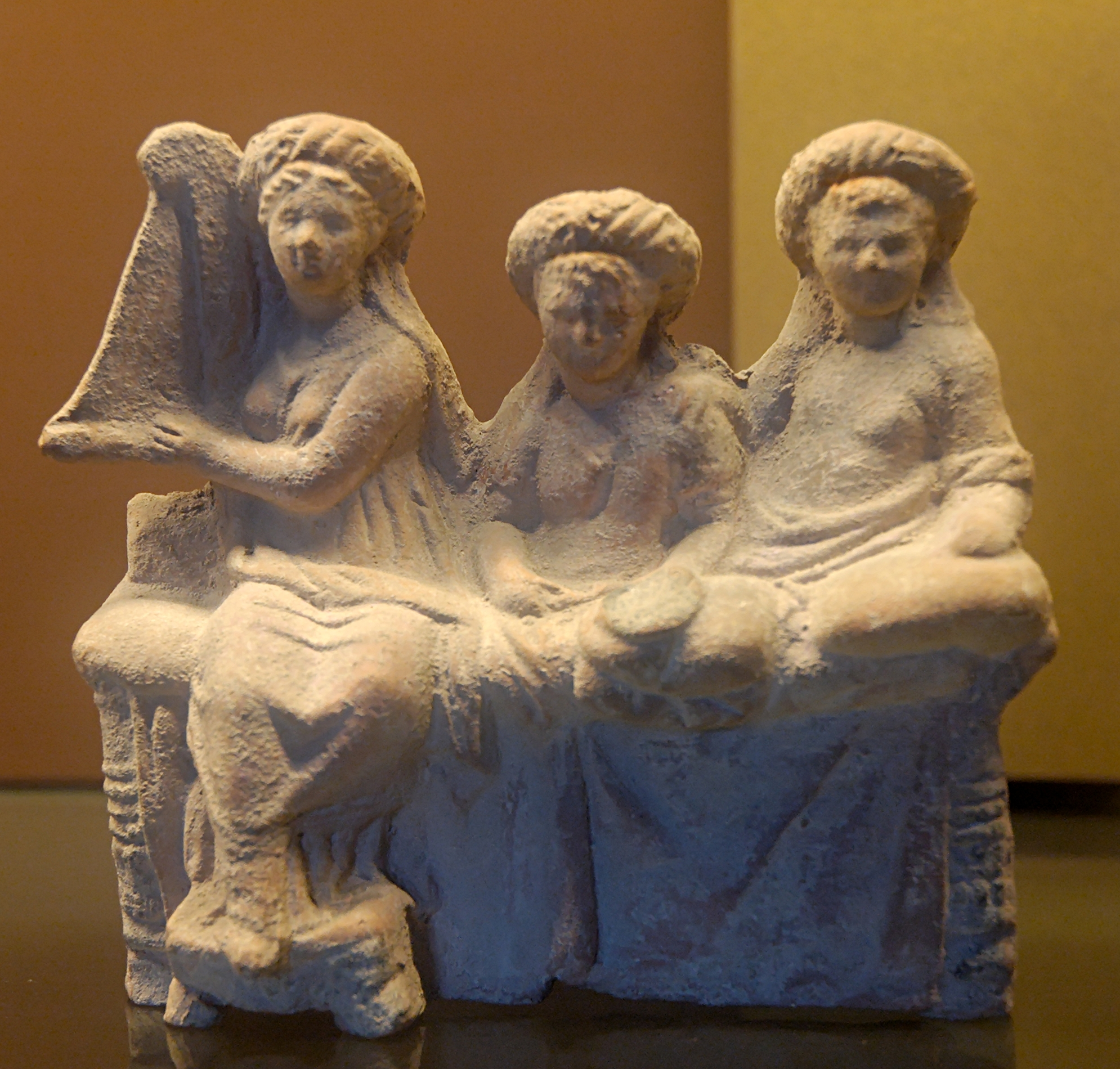
Two banqueters and a psalterion-playing hetaera sitting together on a klinē. Terracotta from Myrina, Mysia, c. 25 BC. The harp is an angular harp.

Traditionally, historians of ancient Greece have distinguished between hetairai and pornai, another class of prostitute. In contrast to pornai, who provided sex for numerous clients in brothels or on the street, hetairai were thought to have had only a few men as clients at any one time, to have had long-term relationships with them and to have provided companionship and intellectual stimulation as well as sex. For instance Charles Seltman wrote in 1953 that "hetaeras were certainly in a very different class, often highly educated women".

More recently historians have questioned the extent to which there was a distinction between hetairai and pornai. The second edition of the Oxford Classical Dictionary, for instance, held that hetaira was a euphemism for any kind of prostitute. This position is supported by Konstantinos Kapparis, who holds that Apollodorus' famous tripartite division of the types of women in the speech Against Neaera ("We have courtesans for pleasure, concubines for the daily tending of the body, and wives in order to beget legitimate children and have a trustworthy guardian of what is at home.") classes all prostitutes together, under the term hetairai.

A third position, advanced by Rebecca Futo Kennedy, suggests that hetairai "were not prostitutes or even courtesans". Instead, she argues, hetairai were "elite women ... who participated in sympotic and luxury culture", just as hetairoi—the masculine form of the word—was used to refer to groups of elite men at symposia.

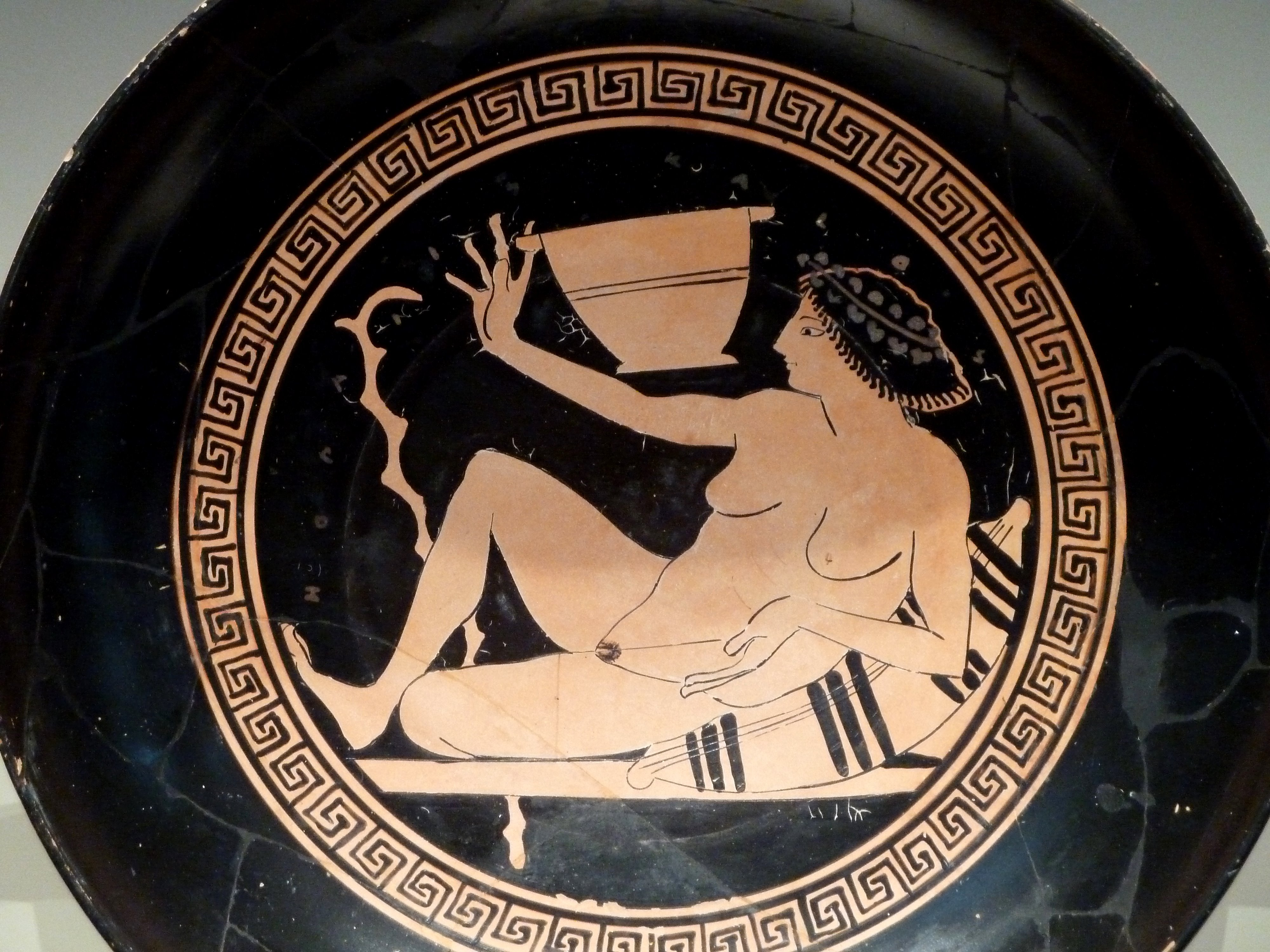
Painting, on the inside of a kylix, of a hetaira or prostitute playing kottabos, a drinking game played at symposia in which the participants flicked the dregs of their wine at a target.

Even when the term hetaira was used to refer to a specific class of prostitute though, scholars disagree on what precisely the line of demarcation was. Kurke emphasises that hetairai veiled the fact that they were selling sex through the language of gift-exchange, whilst pornai explicitly commodified sex. Leslie Kurke claims that both hetairai and pornai could be slaves or free and might or might not work for a pimp. Kapparis says that hetairai were high-class prostitutes, and cites Dover as pointing to the long-term nature of hetairai's relationships with individual men. Miner disagrees with Kurke, claiming that hetairai were always free, not slaves.

Along with sexual services, women described as hetairai rather than pornai seem to have often been educated and have provided companionship. According to Kurke, the concept of hetairism was a product of the symposium, where hetairai were permitted as sexually available companions of the male party-goers. In Athenaeus' Deipnosophistai, hetairai are described as providing "flattering and skillful conversation": something which is, elsewhere in classical literature, seen as a significant part of the hetaira's role. Particularly, "witty" and "refined" were seen as attributes which distinguished hetairai from common pornai. Hetairai are likely to have been musically educated, too.

Free hetairai could become very wealthy, and control their own finances. However, their careers could be short, and if they did not earn enough to support themselves, they might have been forced to resort to working in brothels, or working as pimps, in order to ensure a continued income as they got older.

== Iconography ==
Scholars also disagree about the identification of hetaeras in ancient Greek vase painting. Attributes which might identify hetaeras include nudity, involvement in erotic activity, and the presence of money bags. Working with textiles, depiction on kylixes, and being named in inscriptions have all also been used as evidence that women depicted on vases are hetaeras. However, the reliability of all of these indications has been questioned: for instance nudity in the context of athletics, wedding rituals, or supplication does not necessarily relate to sex work. Some scholars have argued that it is impossible to distinguish hetaeras from other kinds of women, or that some depictions of women are intentionally ambiguous.

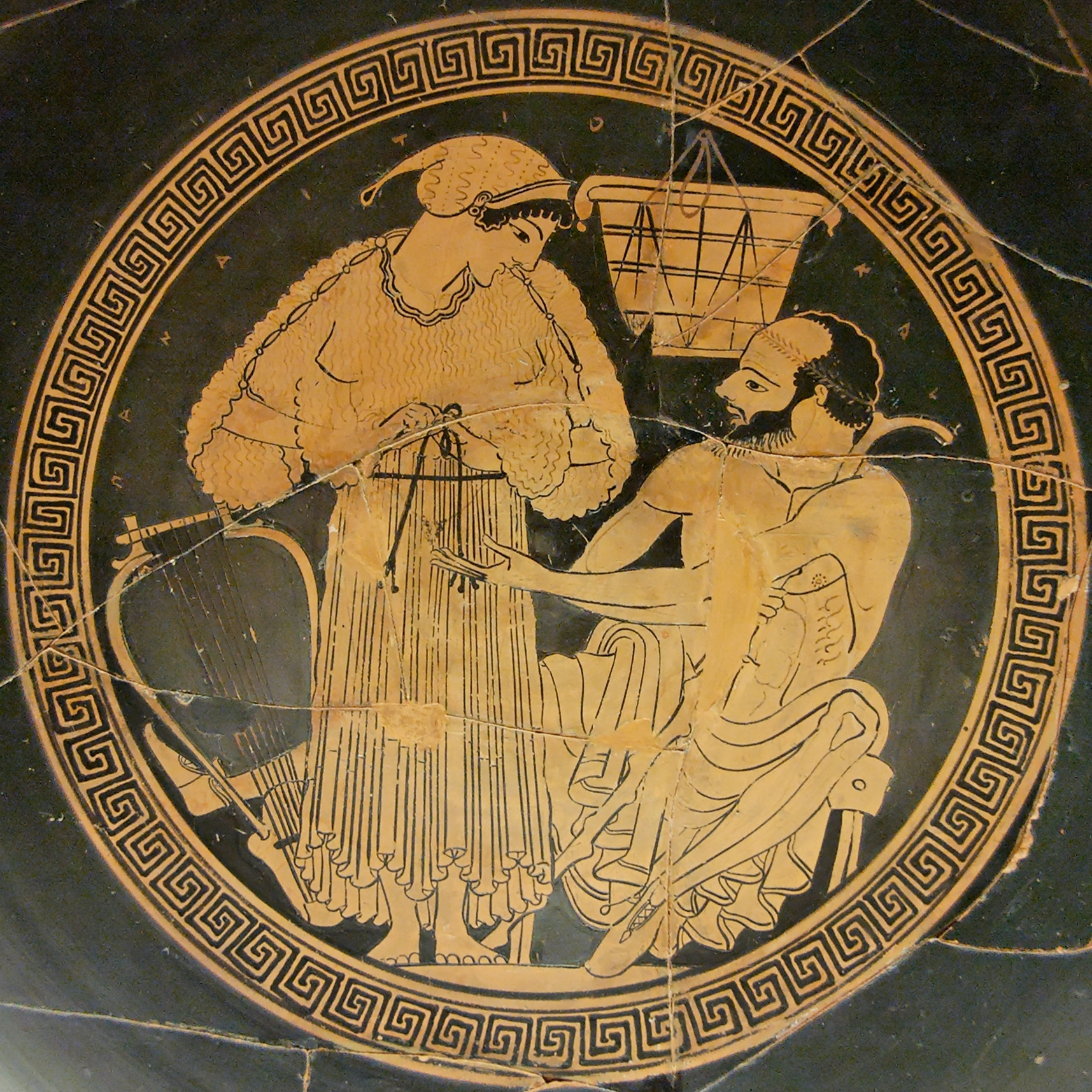
A prostitute putting on her himation in front of her client. The lyre shows that she is a musician called for a banquet. Tondo of an Attic cup with red figures. Euphronius v. 490 BC, British Museum.

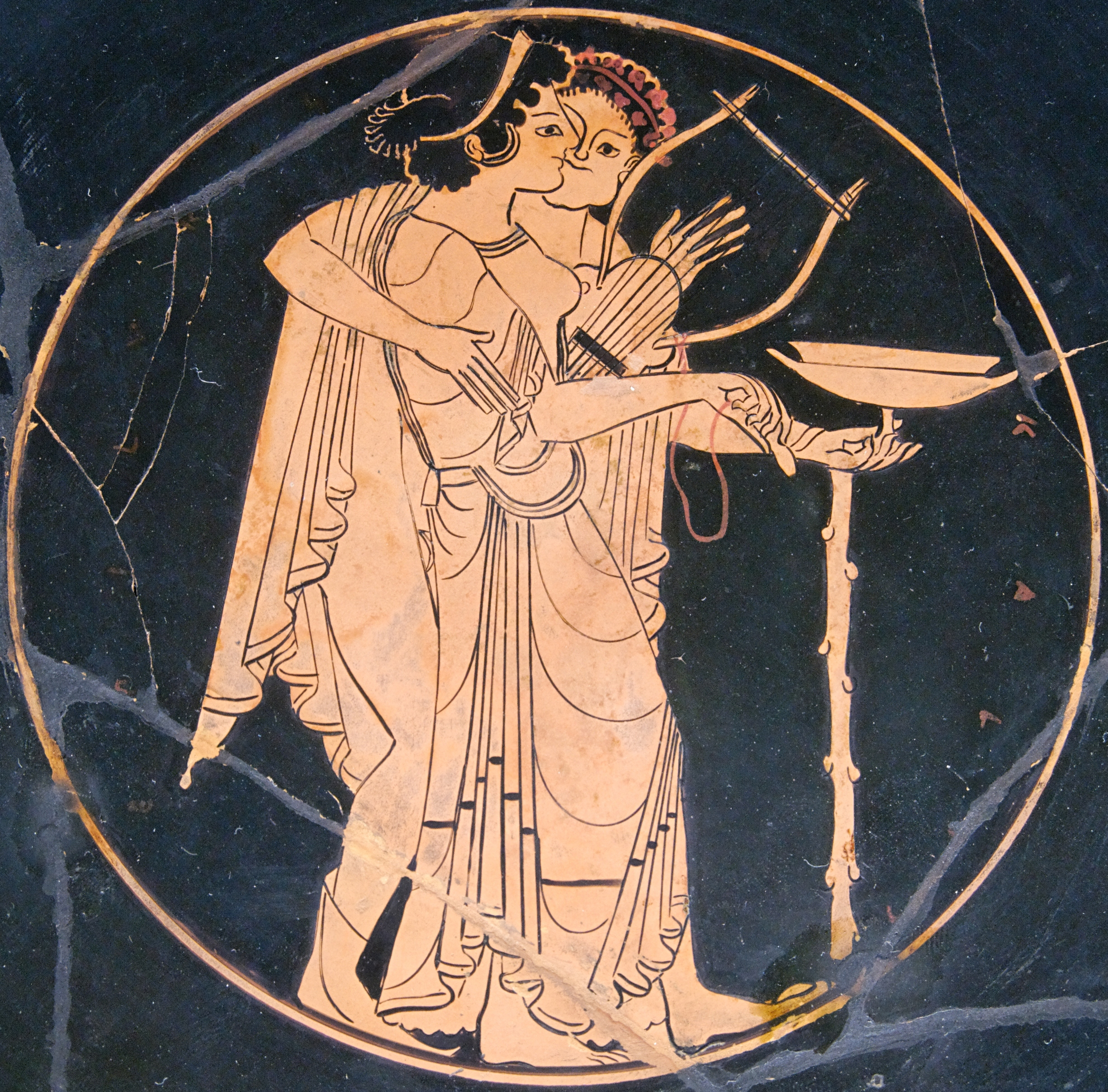
Drunken banqueter with a drinking dish, flirting with a musician holding a lyre or barbiton

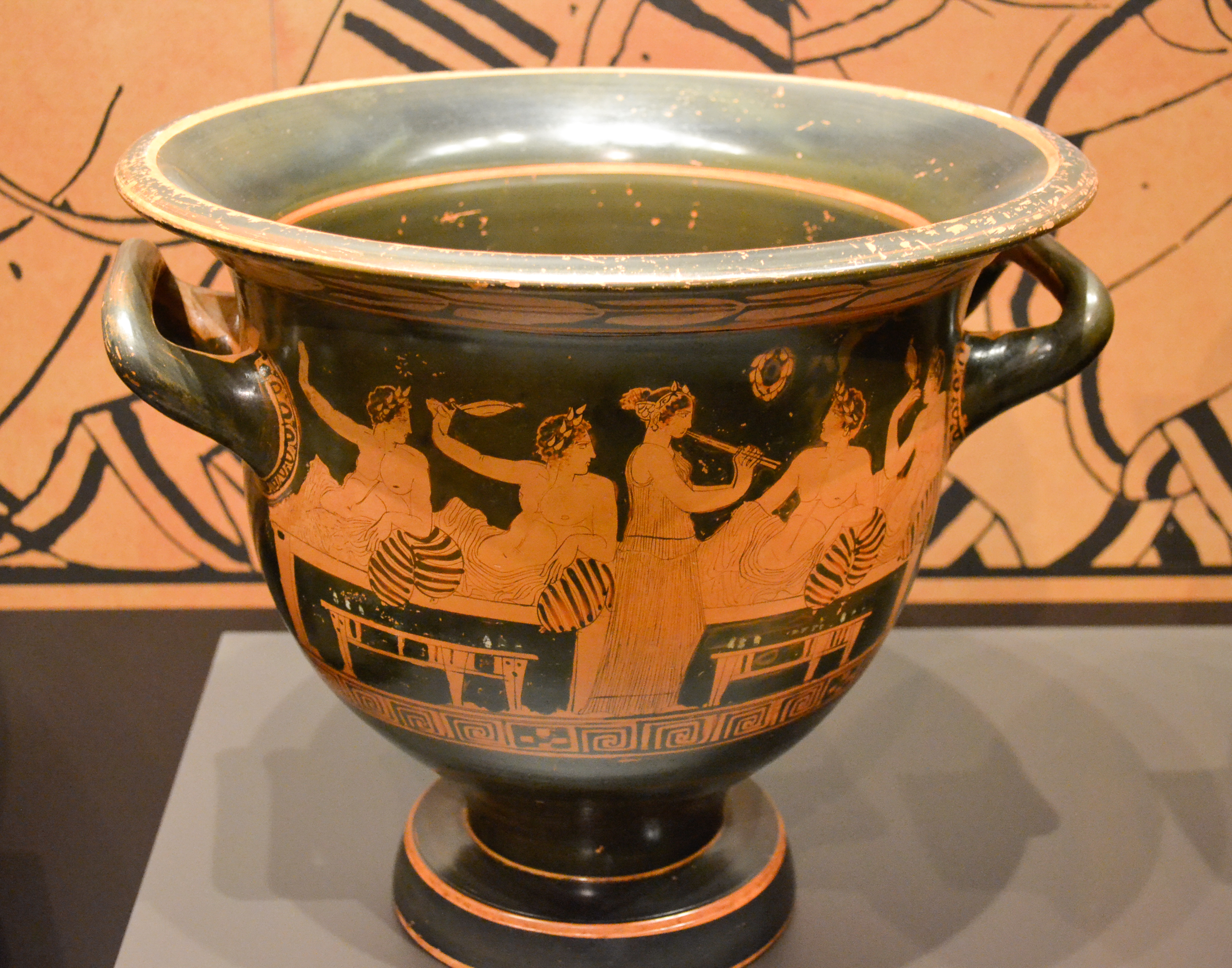
Symposium, men on couches, the only woman present is a hetaira.

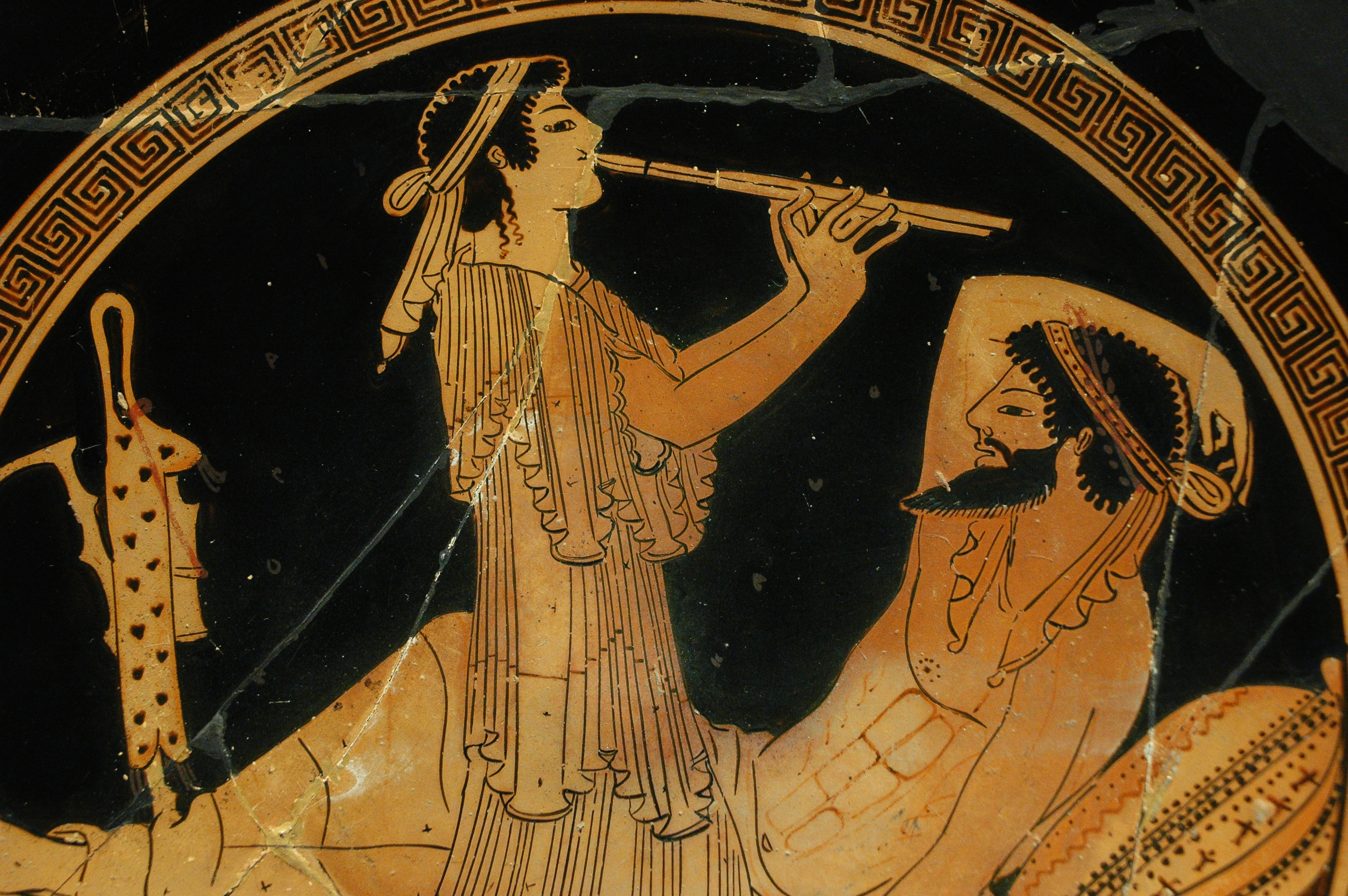
Party musicians are often associated with prostitution. Bottom painting of a bowl from Attica, with red clay figures on a black background. The author is the so-called Painter of Colmar, c. 480 BC. The Louvre Museum.

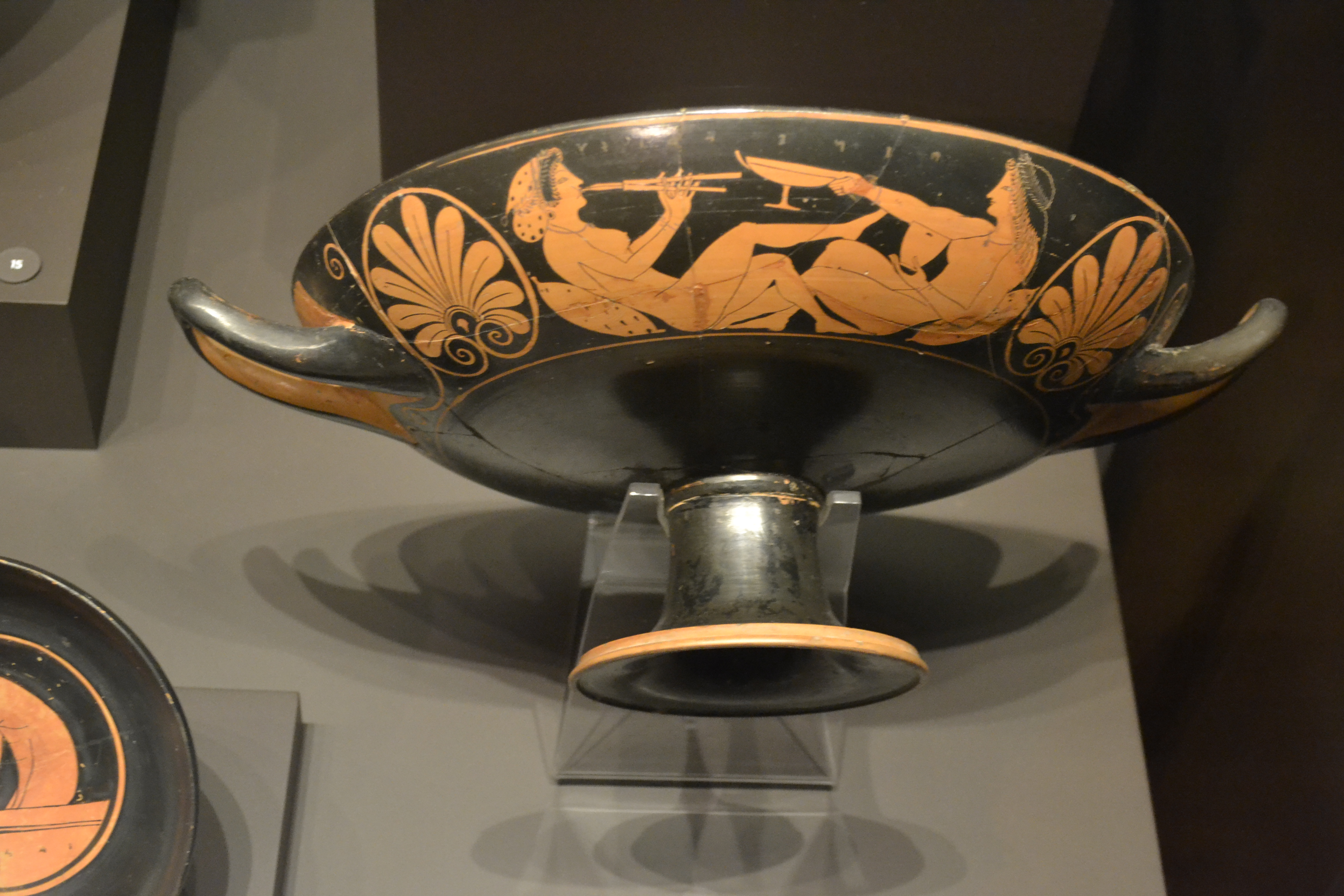
Man and hetaira in symposium

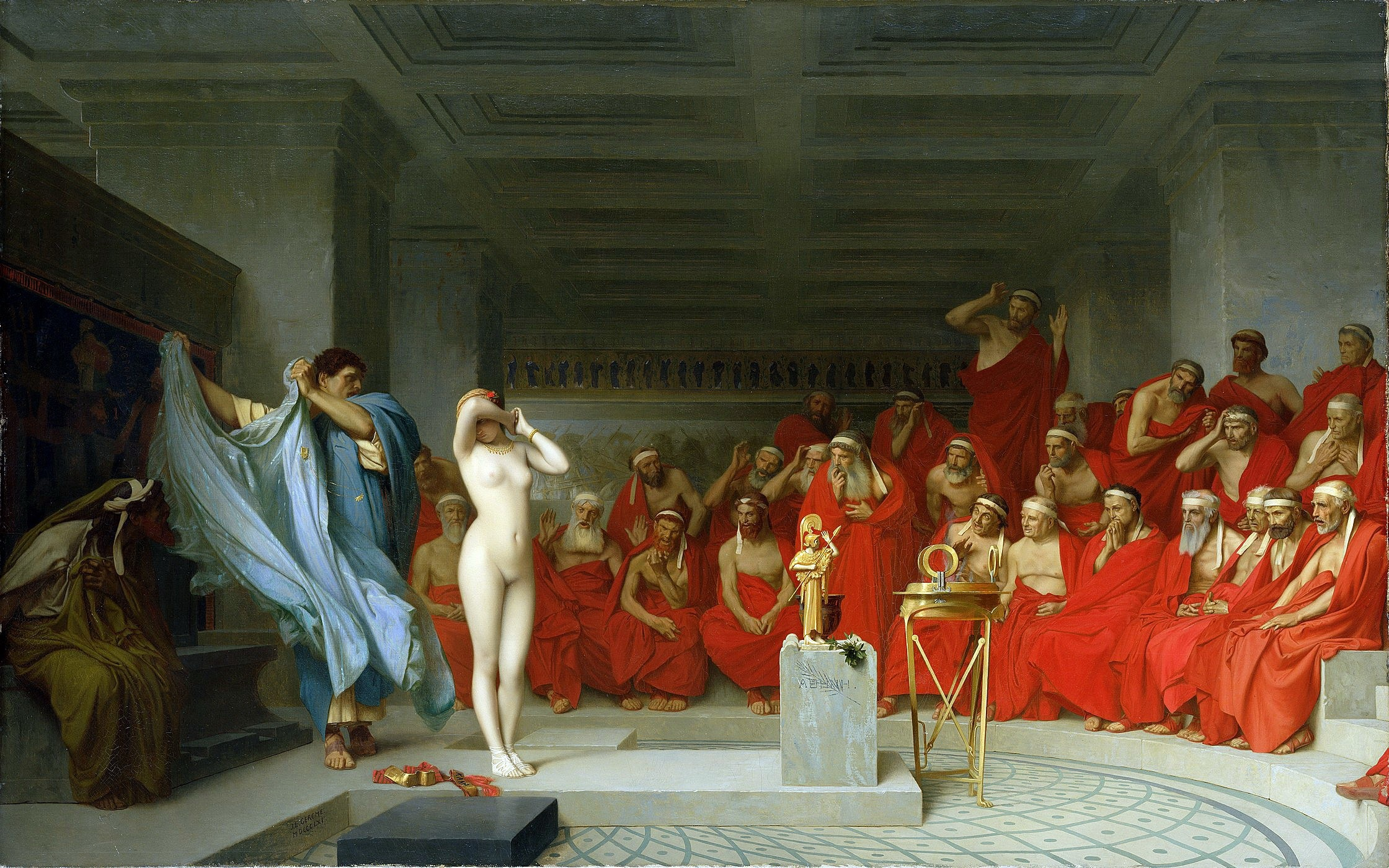
19th century interpretation of the hetaira: Jean-Léon Gérôme's painting Phryne Before the Areopagus depicts the hetaira Phryne on trial. The sight of her nude body, according to legend, persuaded the jurors to acquit her.

== Famous hetaira ==
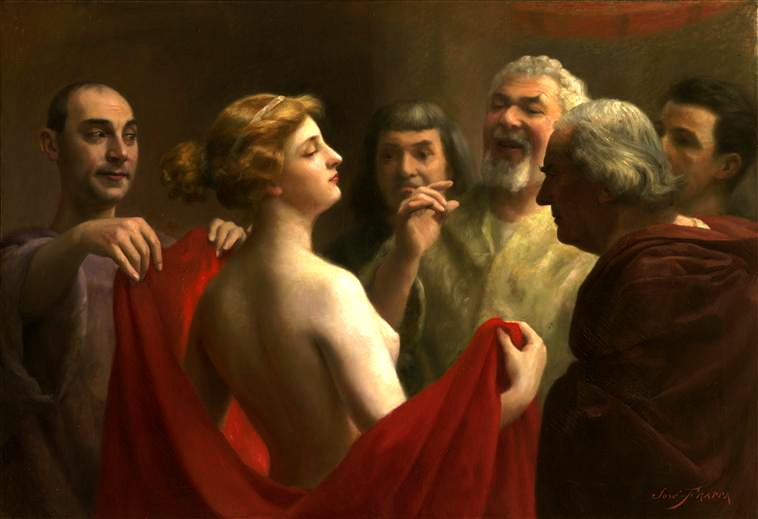
Phryne, by José Frappa, before 1903

=== Phryne ===
Phryne was a 4th-century BC Greek hetaira. Her service as an artistic muse, alongside her trial for impiety and the apocryphal story that she bared her breasts to win an acquittal, earned her lasting fame.

=== Thais ===
One of the most famous hetairai was Thaïs, courtesan of Alexander III of Macedon (Alexander the Great). Some historians (mostly Plutarch, biographer of Alexander) note her involvement in Alexander's burning of Persepolis. After his death, she married Ptolemy I Soter, King of Egypt and one of Alexander's generals and thus became queen consort of Egypt.

=== Theodora ===
Empress Theodora married Emperor Justinian I of Byzantium and became Empress of Byzantium. Her involvement and her status as a hetaira is controversial and still debated. Under her de jure co-reign with Justinian, the Byzantine Empire reached its greatest extent. She was deeply involved in many Byzantine controversies.

== Fictional hetairai ==
- Aedonion (Ἀηδόνιον; "nightingale"), a hetaira in Alciphron's Letters, featured in "Hectodioctes to Mandilocolaptes". She is associated with Gorgias of the Eteobutadae family, with whom she is angry.

== See also ==
- List of prostitutes and courtesans of antiquity
- Oiran: class of courtesans in Edo period and Imperial Japan
- Qayna: class of courtesans in pre-modern Islamic world
- Prostitution in ancient Rome
- Hetair-, a Greek linguistic root
