= Dilator =

Dilator or dilatator may refer to:

- Dilator (medical instrument), a surgical instrument or medical implement used to induce dilation, such as:
  - Cervical dilator
  - Rectal dilator
  - Vaginal dilator
- a pharmacological treatment used to induce dilation, such as:
  - Cervical dilation#Induced dilation in childbirth
  - Vasodilator
  - Bronchodilator
- A muscle which causes dilation of a part, such as:
  - Iris dilator muscle
  - Dilator naris muscle

== See also ==
- Sound (medical instrument), a device to penetrate or enlarge a body passage
- Stent, a device to keep a body passage open
