= Tree (installation) =

Inflatable sculpture by Paul McCarthy

- Artist: Paul McCarthy
- Completion date: October 2014
- Dimensions: 24 m (79 ft)
- Condition: Destroyed; removed
- Location: Paris; 48.8675°N 2.3294°E

Tree was a controversial 24-metre (79 ft) high inflatable sculpture by the artist Paul McCarthy that was briefly installed in the Place Vendôme in Paris in October 2014 as part of a Paris International Contemporary Art Fair (FIAC) exhibition called "Hors les murs".

Although officially described as a Christmas tree, it was widely criticized for its similarity in appearance to a huge green butt plug. McCarthy admitted that it was deliberately shaped as such as a joke.

The controversy over the sculpture led to McCarthy being assaulted and the sculpture being vandalized only two days after its installation; a vandal climbed the fencing around it and cut the power supply which kept it inflated, in addition to cutting the cords holding it up. McCarthy stated that he did not want the work repaired or replaced.

The attention given to the sculpture brought a boom in sales of real butt plugs in Paris: a sex shop owner reported that he usually sold 50 per month predominantly to gay men, but in November 2014 sold over 1,000 roughly divided equally between men and women.

In 2016, he again exhibited Tree at Paramount Ranch 3 in the Santa Monica Mountains, where the reception was positive and visitors "reveled in its absurdist glory".

== See also ==
- Brussels Christmas tree, abstract Christmas tree which caused controversy in 2012
- Santa Claus, or colloquially Buttplug gnome, sculpture in Rotterdam.
