= Vaginal stenosis =

- Specialty: Gynecology

Vaginal stenosis is an abnormal condition in which the vagina becomes narrower and shorter due to the formation of fibrous tissue. Vaginal stenosis can contribute to sexual dysfunction, dyspareunia and make pelvic exams difficult and painful. The lining of the vagina may also be thinner and drier and contain scar tissue. This condition can result in pain during sexual intercourse or a pelvic exam. Vaginal stenosis is often caused by radiation therapy to the pelvis, an episiotomy, or other forms of surgical procedures. Chemotherapy can also increase the likelihood of developing vaginal stenosis. Vaginal stenosis can also result from genital reconstructive surgery in people with congenital adrenal hyperplasia.

== Signs and symptoms ==
Common indicators of vaginal stenosis include pain and bleeding during sexual intercourse along with other types of sexual dysfunction. This can lead to challenges such as difficulty engaging in intercourse and decreased sex drive. Severe forms of vaginal stenosis can be associated with a complete inability to participate in sexual intercourse.

Atrophy, scarring, and damage to the vaginal tissue due to vaginal stenosis can lead to dryness, inflammation, and decreased elasticity of the tissue.

Lasting effects of vaginal stenosis could include impacts on psychological well-being in addition to physical limitations. Symptoms can worsen from post treatment ovarian failure or menopausal status, leading to reduced lubrication and increased thinning of the vaginal tissue.

== Causes ==
=== Radiation-induced ===
Uterine, vaginal, anal, rectal and cervical cancers are often treated with pelvic radiation therapy (RT), most commonly external beam radiation therapy (EBRT) or brachytherapy. Radiation-induced vaginal stenosis can be a side effect of treatment. It is one of the most prevalent side effects, affecting about one third of people undergoing pelvic radiation therapy. Radiation-induced stenosis can be a late reaction to treatment. Damage to the vaginal epithelium causes abnormal collagen production that leads to atrophy, loss of muscle, decreased blood flow, hypoxia, and fibrosis. Pallor, adhesions, and fragility can be observed along with loss of elasticity. These can all contribute to sexual dysfunction that affects more than half of gynecological cancer survivors. Some women who have reduced ovarian function and an estrogen shortage after RT can have an even thinner vaginal mucosal lining that worsens vaginal stenosis.

==== Risk factors ====
While the severity of vaginal stenosis depends largely on the type of radiation therapy received, several risk factors can contribute to the development of vaginal stenosis. Women over the age of 50 with cervical cancer tend to have a higher risk of vaginal stenosis from radiation therapy. Tobacco use is also associated with a higher risk of vaginal stenosis. There is also a high correlation between vaginal stenosis and vaginal pallor reactions, which is when the mucous membranes thin and dry out, leading to inflammation and fibrosis.

=== Surgical procedures ===
Several types of surgical procedures are hypothesized to cause vaginal stenosis. Episiotomies, which are surgical incisions sometimes used to assist childbirth, can lead to narrowing of the vaginal opening and long-term dyspareunia. There is approximately 13% chance of experiencing dyspareunia for at least 6 months after having undergone a routine episiotomy. When the tissue from the episiotomy does not heal properly, complications can include mucosal damage and scarring, which can contribute to the development of vaginal stenosis. Vaginal stenosis is the most common post-operative complication in people with congenital adrenal hyperplasia who have had genital reconstructive surgery in infancy or childhood. Vaginal stenosis can be an immediate complication or may arise later in adolescence. Additionally, in people undergoing a male-to female gender-affirming surgical procedure, such as vaginoplasty, vaginal stenosis has been shown to be a common post-surgical complication.

== Diagnosis ==
There are currently several grading scales that exist to assess vaginal stenosis but none have been well established. Two common grading scales are the National Cancer Institute's Common Terminology Criteria for Adverse Events (CTCAE) v4.0 and the Late Effects in Normal Tissues-Subjective, Objective, Management and Analytic Score (LENT-SOMA). The CTCAE v4.0 assesses vaginal strictures based on three grades based upon shortening or narrowing of the vagina, its interference with physical examination, and its interference with use of tampons or sexual activity. However, this scale is not specific to just vaginal injuries alone. The LENT-SOMA grading scale for vaginal stenosis is based on the assessment of subjective symptoms, analytical tests, and observed clinical manifestations. This scale was invented by the European Organization for the Research and Treatment of Cancer (EORTC) along with the Radiation Therapy Oncology Group (RTOG) from the US.

The lack of a well-established grading scale has potentially led to poor vaginal dilator therapy and long-term vaginal stenosis. Vaginal stenosis is most often diagnosed with subjective parameters. These subjective parameters in combination with the variety of different grading scales used, cannot be interchanged in clinical practice. This makes it harder to properly diagnose the condition and establish a standard treatment.

== Treatment ==
=== Vaginal Dilator Therapy (VDT) ===
Stenosis of the vagina is typically treated with vaginal dilator therapy (VDT), but evidence is lacking for its efficacy. Vaginal dilators are smooth, cylindrical-shaped devices that promote stretching and relaxation of the vaginal tissue. Vaginal dilator therapy requires a consistent routine and may cause physical and/or psychological discomfort, which makes adherence to treatment difficult. It may be difficult to evaluate the efficacy of vaginal dilation therapy as measures of sexual function and quality of life are hard to quantify and control for. Optimal duration of vaginal dilator therapy and its improvements on sexual function and cancer-related outcomes remain unclear.

Although there is no high level evidence, many guidelines and reviews suggest the use of vaginal dilator therapy after pelvic radiation therapy. It is believed that this therapy stretches vaginal tissues and the vaginal canal, leading to epithelial cell growth, and decreasing potential circumferential fibrosis. Some studies have even suggested correlations between VDT and preventing risk of severe vaginal stenosis.

Some studies have suggested positive patient outcomes when VDT was coupled with a longer dilation duration. Using VDT with meditation and soothing music has also been shown to increase effectiveness, though evidence for this is not high grade. Regular psychosocial support and regular follow up visits should occur in order to support this therapy and optimize the treatment.

=== Other treatments ===
Recent treatment advances include local hyaluronic acid application, laser therapy, and vaginal estrogen treatment but further investigation is needed. Hyaluronic acid helps treat vaginal stenosis by retaining moisture to promote vaginal tissue repair. There are currently no known contraindications and is commonly used in clinical practice due to its high safety profile.

Laser therapy has been shown to improve symptoms for people with menopausal genital atrophy, but there are currently not many studies on its effect on people with radiotherapy-induced vaginal stenosis. A 2020 study demonstrated an improvement in vaginal length as well as the Vaginal Health Index, though more studies are needed to establish efficacy.

There are limited studies around vaginal estrogen therapy in people with radiotherapy-induced vaginal stenosis due to concerns around an increased risk of tumor recurrence. Similarly, there has been one study conducted that suggests people treated with high dose radiation therapy have a lower likelihood of responding to estrogen treatment.

== Epidemiology ==
The reported incidence of radiotherapy-induced vaginal stenosis varies widely, ranging from 1.2% to 88%. This is due to past studies being limited to small groups as well as variability due to personal factors such as: type of cancer, age, dose and mode of radiation therapy (EBRT or brachytherapy). In addition, symptoms may not occur until a year after radiation therapy and can increase in severity over the course of three years. Vaginal stenosis may also be underreported due to stigma and discomfort around discussion of sexual dysfunction. The estimated incidence of vaginal stenosis in people undergoing radiation therapy is 50% for people with endometrial cancer and 60% for people with cervical cancer. The incidence of vaginal stenosis in people undergoing radiation therapy for anal cancer or colorectal cancer is not well-reported, but is estimated to be up to 80%.

== See also ==
- Vaginal anomalies
