= Butt plug =

Sex toy that is designed to be inserted into the rectum

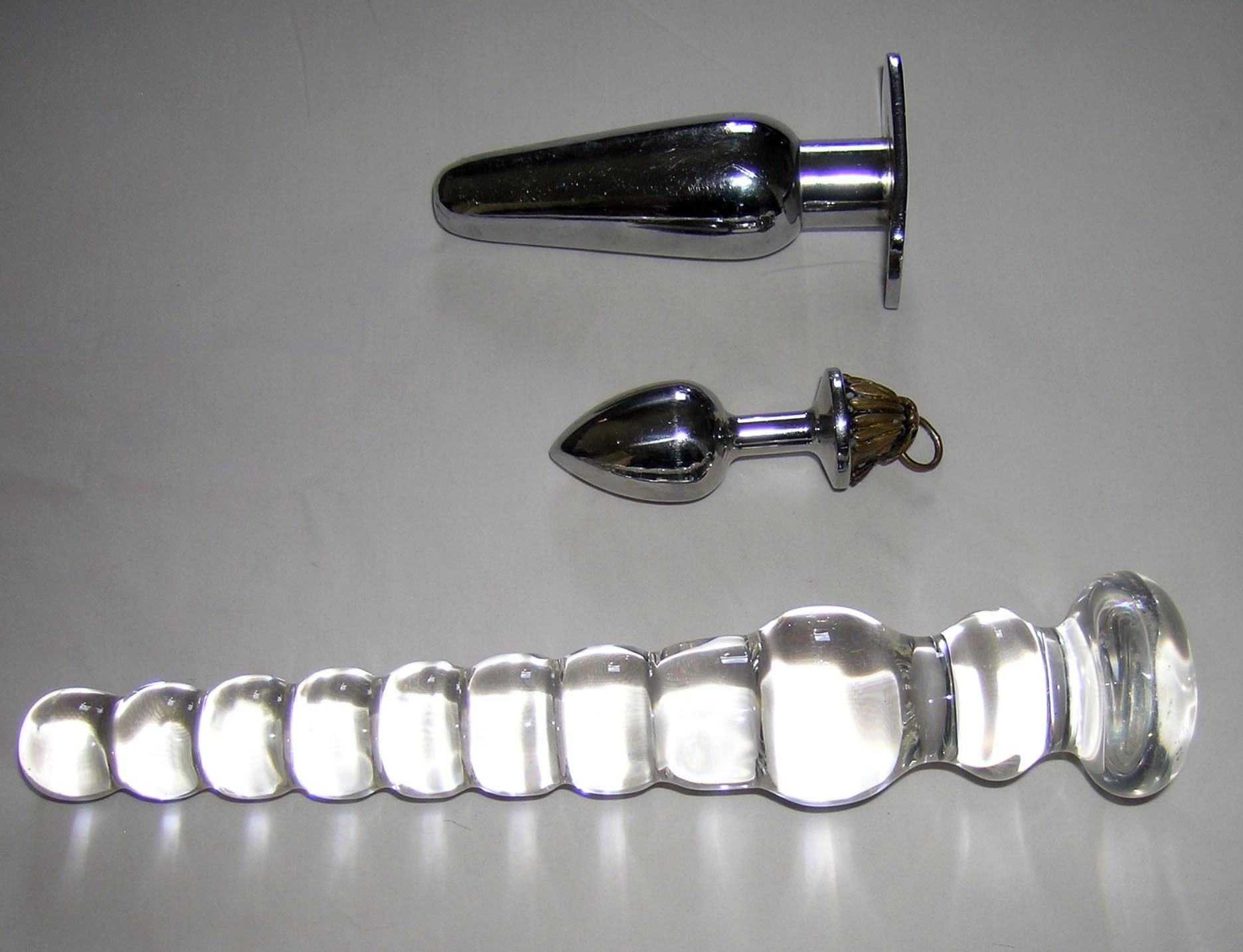
Different types of butt plugs

A butt plug is a sex toy that is designed to be inserted into the rectum for sexual pleasure. They often have a flanged end to prevent the device from being lost inside the rectum.

== History ==
Rectal dilators were originally designed for therapeutic uses and later marketed with terms such as Dr. Young's Ideal Rectal Dilators, which were marketed as a cure for insanity and constipation. In the late 20th century, similar devices started to be marketed as sex toys.

== Basics ==
Butt plugs can be moved in or out for pleasure, so as to simulate the rhythmic thrusting of penetrative sex, although some butt plugs are specifically designed for stimulation of the prostate. As with other activities involving anal penetration, such as anal sex, large amounts of sexual lubricant and a slow gentle approach are needed to insert or remove a butt plug.

Butt plugs must be very smooth to avoid damaging the rectum or bowel. In order to get them into the rectum, they most commonly have a general profile of a round-ended cone which then narrows to a "waist" which locates itself at the anal sphincter, with the flared part outside the body, preventing the butt plug from slipping further into the body. Some butt plugs are enhanced with vibration technology. Certain manufacturers like Lovense produce app-connected versions that allow vibration control through a smartphone.

== Designs ==
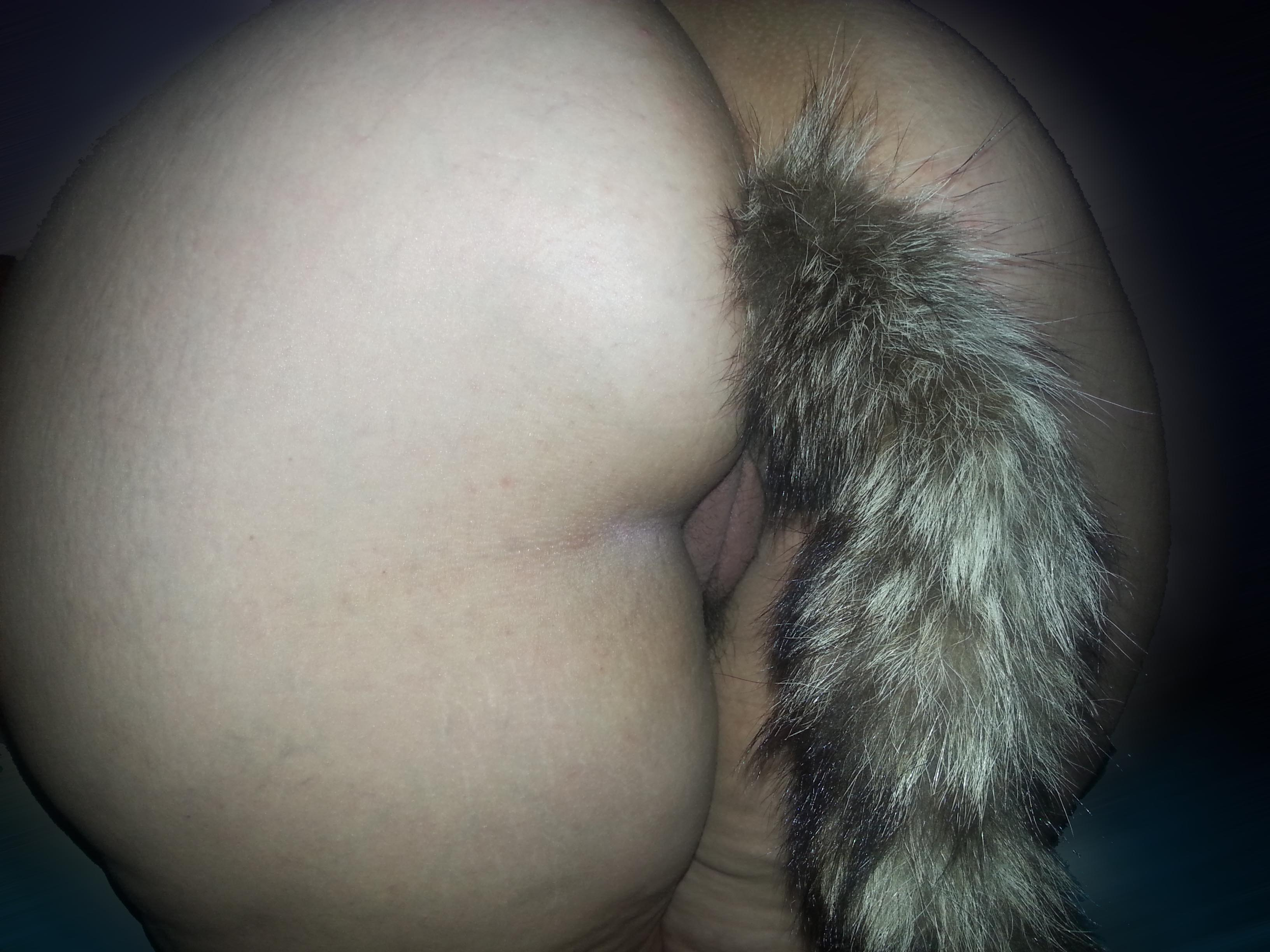
Butt plug with a faux tail

Butt plugs come in a variety of colors, shapes, sizes, and textures. Most have a thin tip which is wider in the middle, a notch to hold it in place once it is inserted, and a flared base to prevent complete insertion into the rectum. Some plugs have an egg-shaped penetrative part. Some plugs are designed (long, flexible and curved) to penetrate the sigmoid colon. Butt plugs are made of a variety of materials, the most common being silicone as it can be disinfected in boiling water. Metal or glass are also recommended as they are nonporous. Some butt plugs include a faux tail on the tip to satisfy the furry kink.

== Risks ==
Unlike the vagina, which is closed off by the cervix, the rectum leads to the sigmoid colon. Objects that are inserted into the rectum can therefore potentially travel up into the bowel; the flared end on a butt plug exists to prevent this. Some dildos lack a flared end, and thus it is not advised to use such dildos anally since they may get stuck; rectal foreign bodies may require medical extraction. However, the flared flange is not a foolproof method of preventing the plug from entering the rectum completely with the inability to retrieve it. This is uncomfortable and may require medical intervention. When inserting a butt plug, one should be gentle, use plenty of lubrication, start with smaller sizes, and exercise patience. While medical data is sparse, some recommend not leaving a butt plug inserted for longer than two to three hours, though anecdotal evidence dictates some users wear their plugs for even longer; some committed practitioners only remove them so as to be able to pass stool.

In addition, the lower bowel above the rectum is easily perforated. For this reason, butt plugs tend to be shorter than dildos, and their marked size generally indicates the circumference of the device rather than the length. Butt plugs of excess diameter can, especially when inserted too rapidly and/or too forcefully, lead to sphincter tear, detachment or other rectal failure. The sphincter muscle will hold the plug in place by the waist, preventing the plug from slipping out unintentionally. Kegel exercises can help maintain normal, healthy sphincter function.

Butt plugs are sometimes covered by condoms for hygiene and to allow for the easy disposal of any feces with which they may come into contact. Nevertheless, they should not be shared with other people, due to the risk of transmitting sexually transmitted infections, including HIV, from the transfer of body fluids from one person to another.

== In culture ==
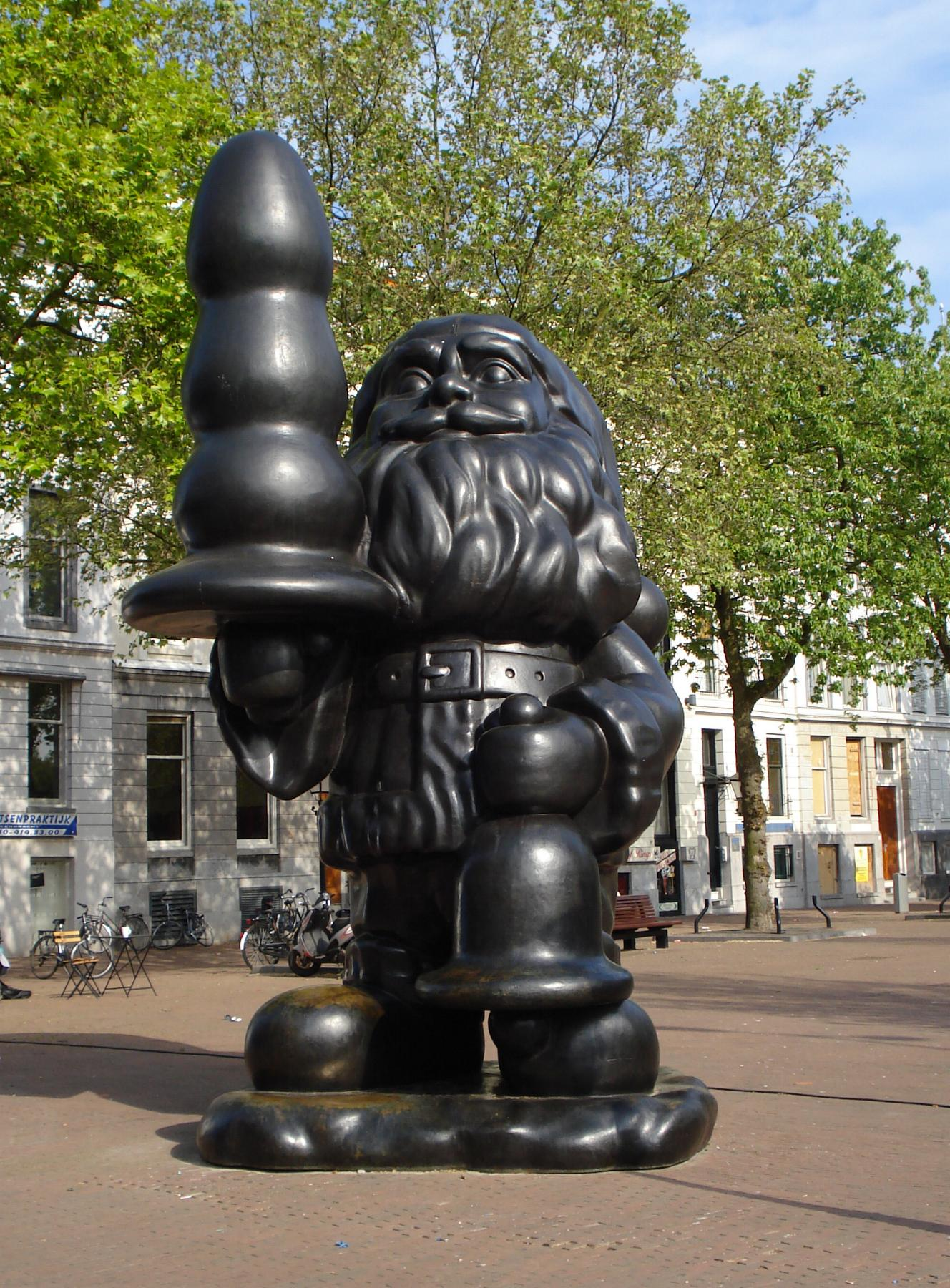
Santa Claus on the Eendrachtsplein, Rotterdam

The sculpture named Santa Claus or the Buttplug Gnome was erected in Rotterdam by Paul McCarthy. The same artist's 2014 sculpture Tree was also deliberately jokingly designed to look like a butt plug.

== See also ==
- Anal beads
- Anal masturbation
- Rectal foreign body
