= Glore Psychiatric Museum =

Museum in Missouri, U.S.

- Established: 1967
- Location: 3406 Frederick Ave., St. Joseph, Missouri, United States
- Coordinates: 39°46′34″N 94°48′30″W
- Type: Psychiatric history
- Founder: George Glore
- Curator: Scott Clark
- Public transit access: St. Joseph Transit
- Website: stjosephmuseum.org/museums/glore/

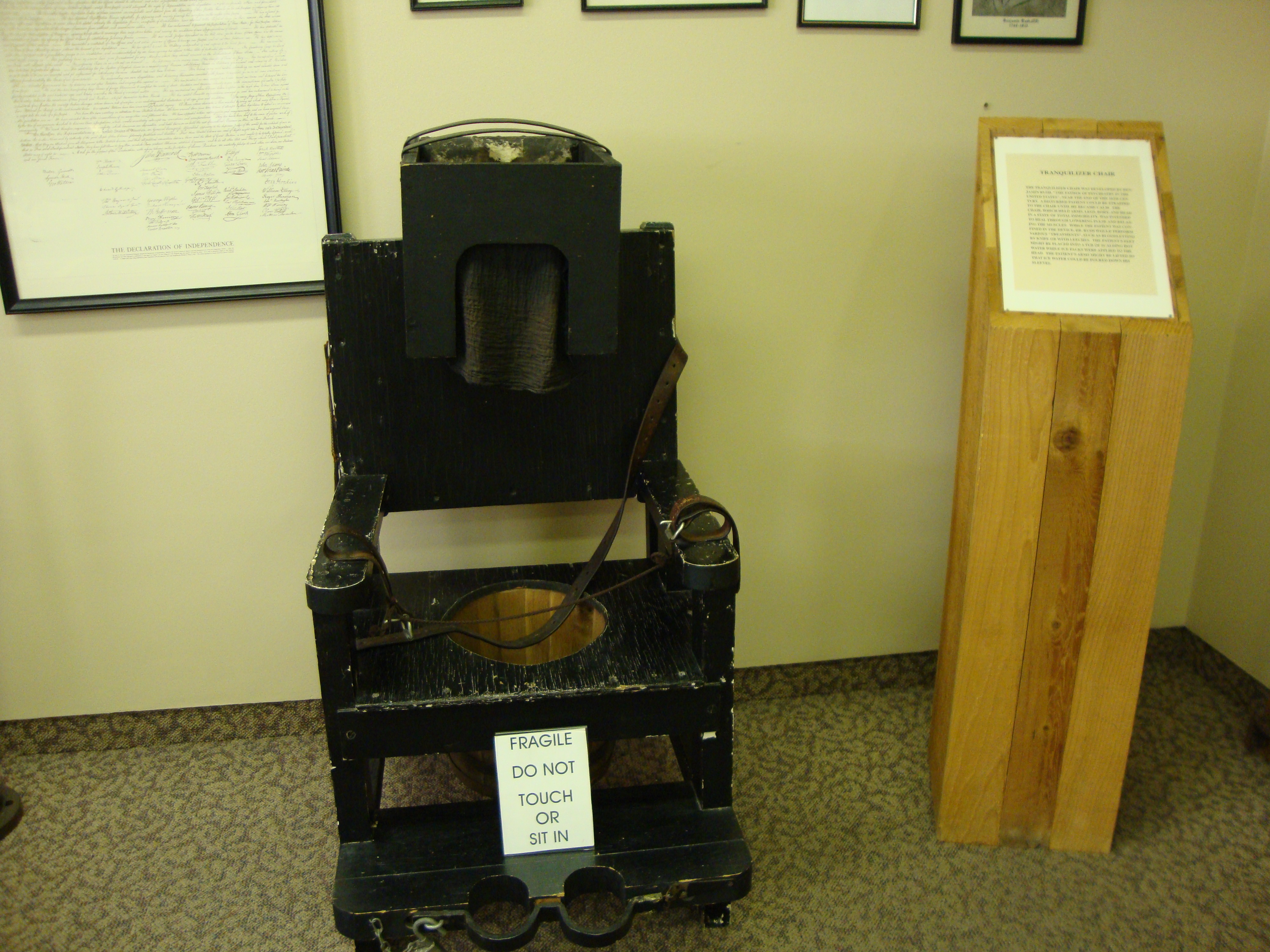
The "Tranquilizer Chair"

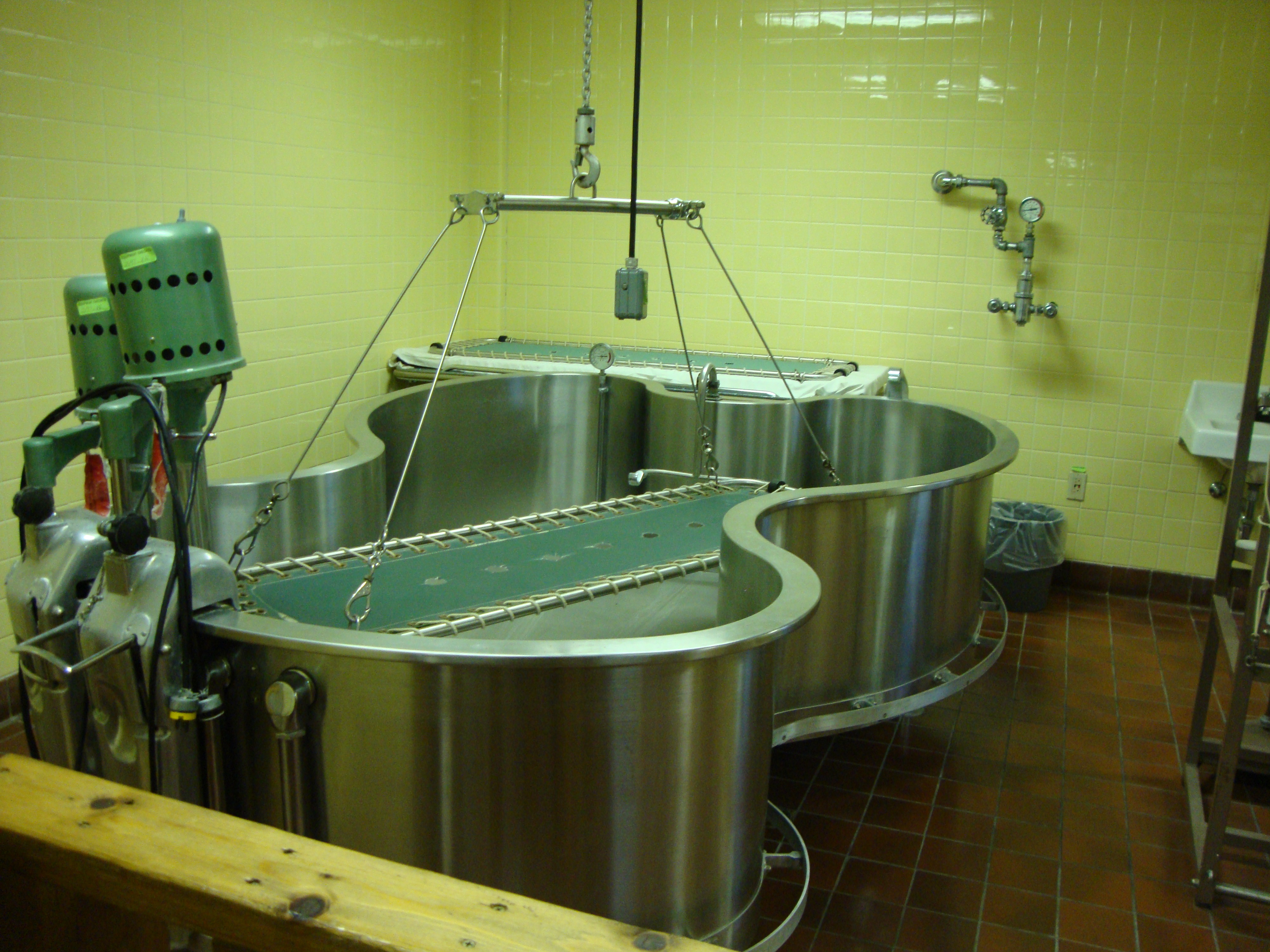
The "Bath of Surprise" for rapidly immersing patients into ice water

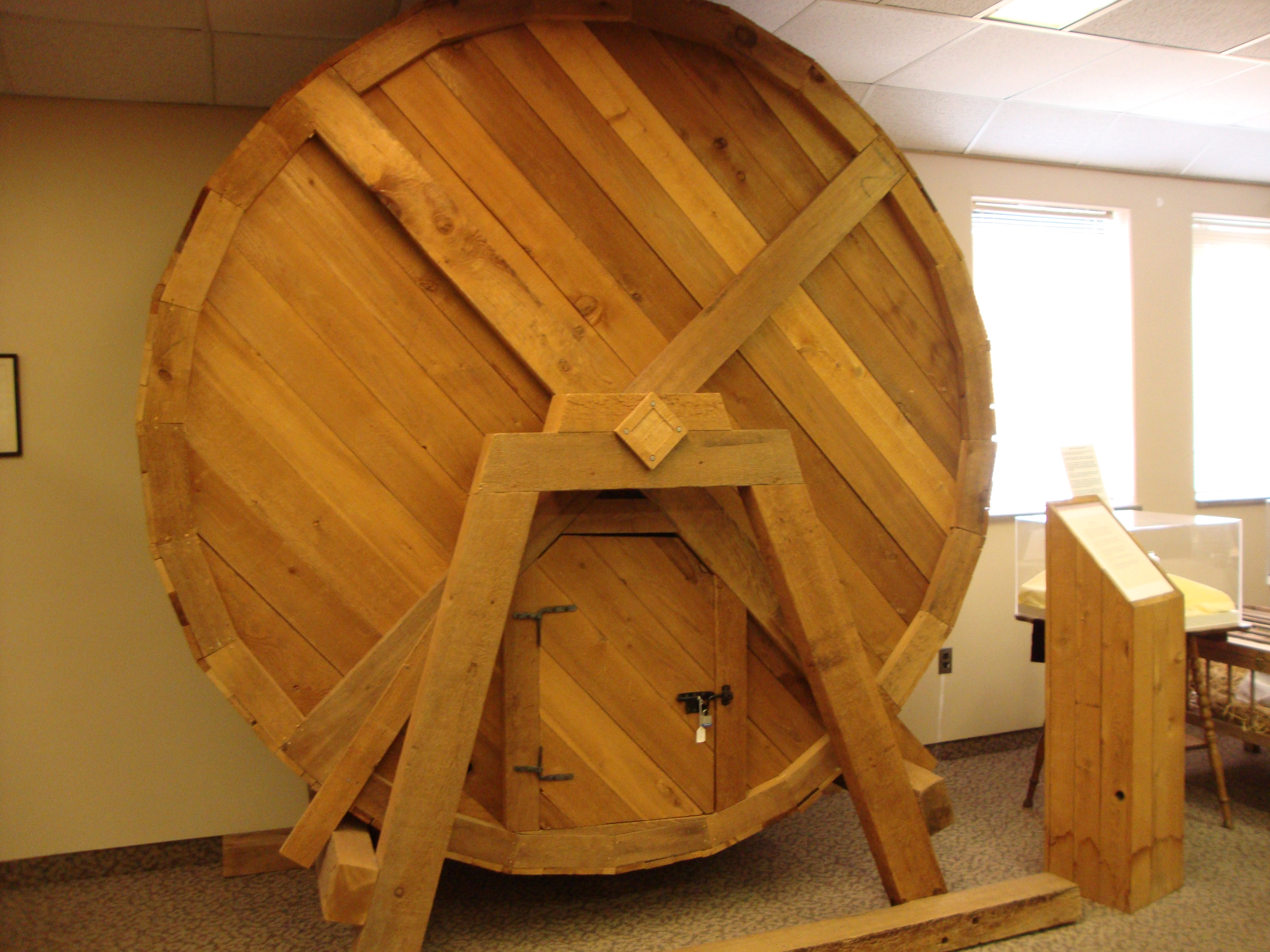
The "Giant Patient Treadmill" allowed patients to walk off excess energy.

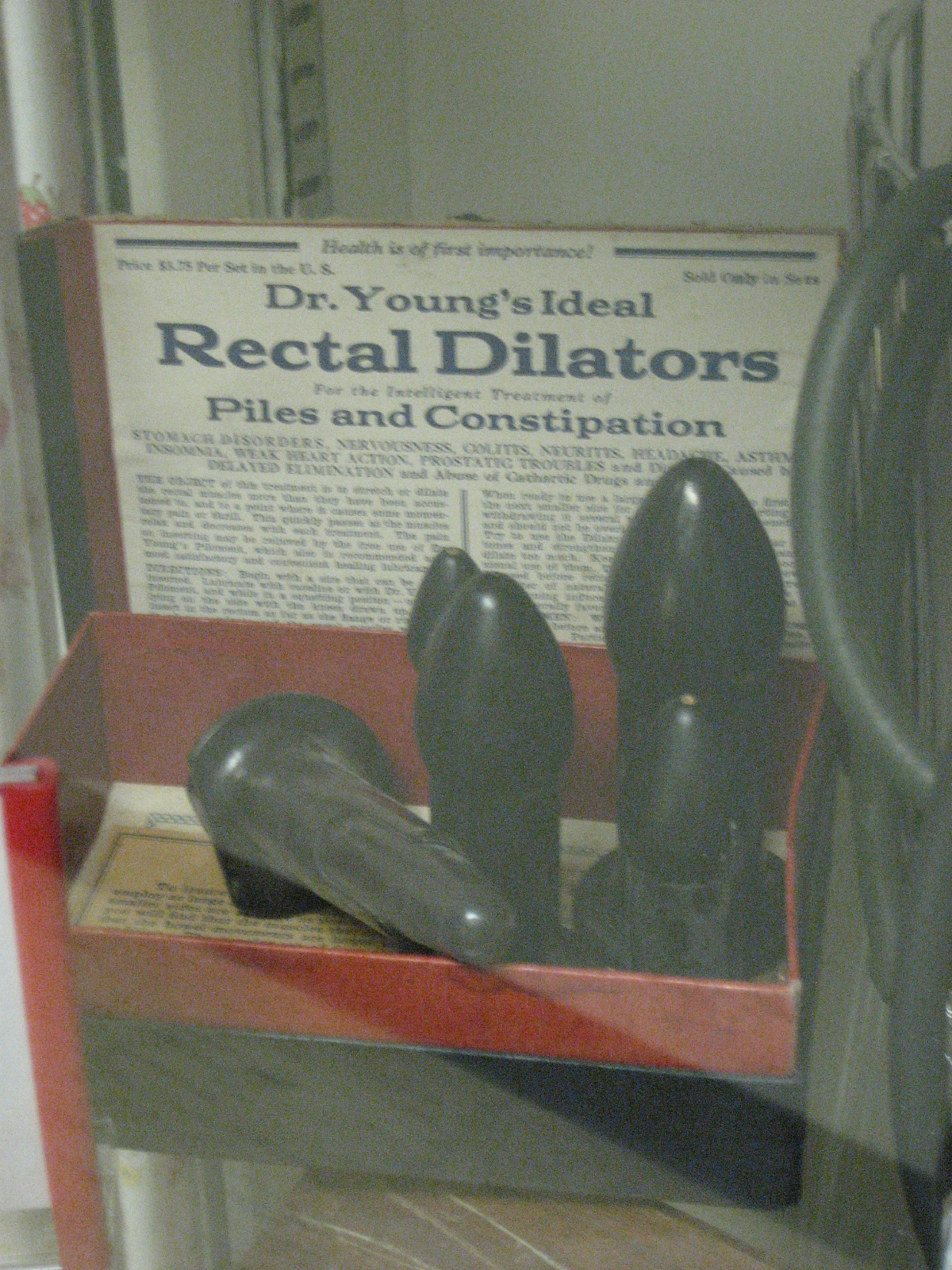
Dr. Young's Ideal Rectal Dilators exhibited in the museum

The Glore Psychiatric Museum is part of a complex of St. Joseph, Missouri, museums, along with the Black Archives Museum, the St. Joseph Museum, and the American Indian and History Galleries. The Glore exhibits feature the 130-year history of the adjacent state mental hospital, and illustrate the history of mental health treatment through the ages. It has been called one of the fifty most unusual museums in the United States.

== History ==
The collection began in 1966 when George Glore, an employee of the Missouri Department of Mental Health, built some life-size models of primitive devices formerly used for mental health treatment, for display during a Mental Health Awareness Week. The models, together with a growing collection of other artifacts, became a museum in 1967, designed to illustrate how the treatment of mental illness has progressed through time. Glore explained, "We really can't have a good appreciation of the strides we've made (in mental health treatment) if we don't look at the atrocities of the past." Glore continued to add to the collection throughout his 41-year career with the department. After his retirement in the 1990s he continued to serve as the museum's curator until his death in 2010, after which Scott Clark became curator.

The museum was first located in a ward of the original "State Lunatic Asylum No. 2", renamed the "St. Joseph State Hospital" in 1899. The asylum was built in 1874 and resembled a fortress. From an initial population of 25 patients it expanded until it housed nearly 3,000 patients in the 1950s. In the 1990s it was re-purposed as a state prison, and a new 108-bed facility called Northwest Missouri Psychiatric Rehabilitation opened across the street from the original hospital. The Glore Museum moved to a 1968 building outside the prison gates that was originally a clinic for patients at the mental hospital.

== Exhibits ==
The museum displays many artifacts from the mental hospital, including medical equipment, staff uniforms, photographs, and artwork and writing created by the patients. One exhibit tells the story of a man who spent 72 years as a patient in the hospital.

Some of the most notable exhibits are the full-sized models, built by Glore, of treatment devices from the 16th, 17th, and 18th centuries. One such item is a "Tranquilizer Chair", complete with hood, hand and feet restraints and a built-in portable toilet to accommodate extended sessions. The chair was invented by Benjamin Rush, known as "The Father of American Psychiatry", who published the first American textbook about mental illness in 1812.

Other items include the "Bath of Surprise", a platform designed to quickly submerse the patient into a bath of ice water; the "Giant Patient Treadmill," which would encourage agitated patients to remain still, lest they become exhausted by causing movement of the giant wheel; the "Lunatic Box", an upright, coffin-like box in which patients who were deemed uncontrollable were confined until they calmed down; and the "O'Halloran's Swing", a hammock-like device used to calm an agitated patient or induce sleep.

== See also ==
- Emotional mental health in the United States
- History of psychiatric institutions
- Psychiatric hospital
