= Dilator (medical instrument) =

Surgical instrument or medical implement used to expand an opening or passage

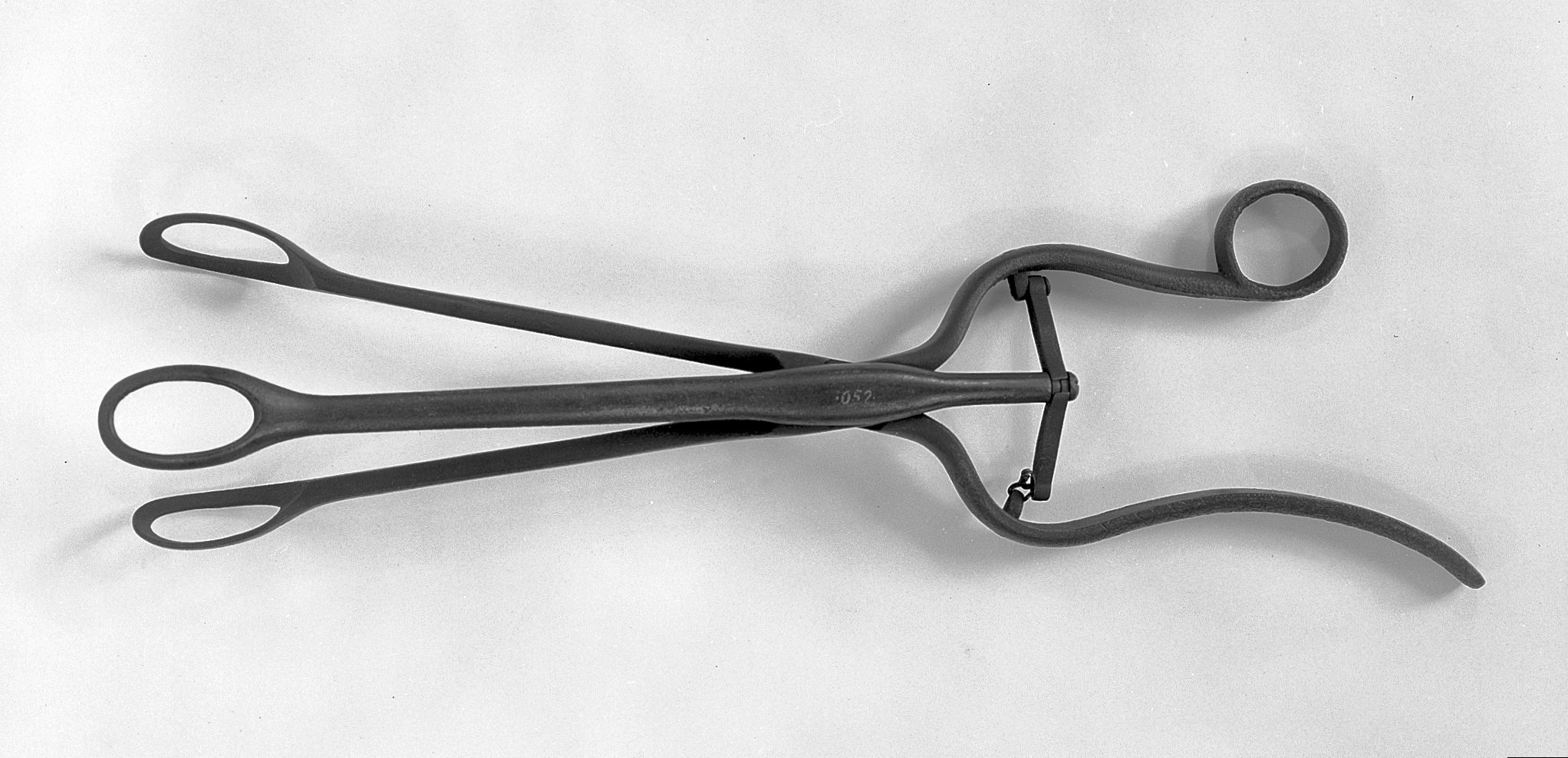
A 16th-century lithotomy dilator, used to expand the urethra for extraction of urinary stones

A dilator (or dilatator) is a surgical instrument or medical implement used to induce dilation, that is, to expand an opening or passage such as the cervix (see cervical dilator), urethra, esophagus, or vaginal introitus. Dilators may also be used to increase the size of a surgical incision, for example during insertion of a venous catheter.

Types of dilators include vaginal dilators, rectal dilators, and urethral sounds.

== See also ==
- Sound (medical instrument)
