= Santa Claus (sculpture) =

2001 statue in Rotterdam

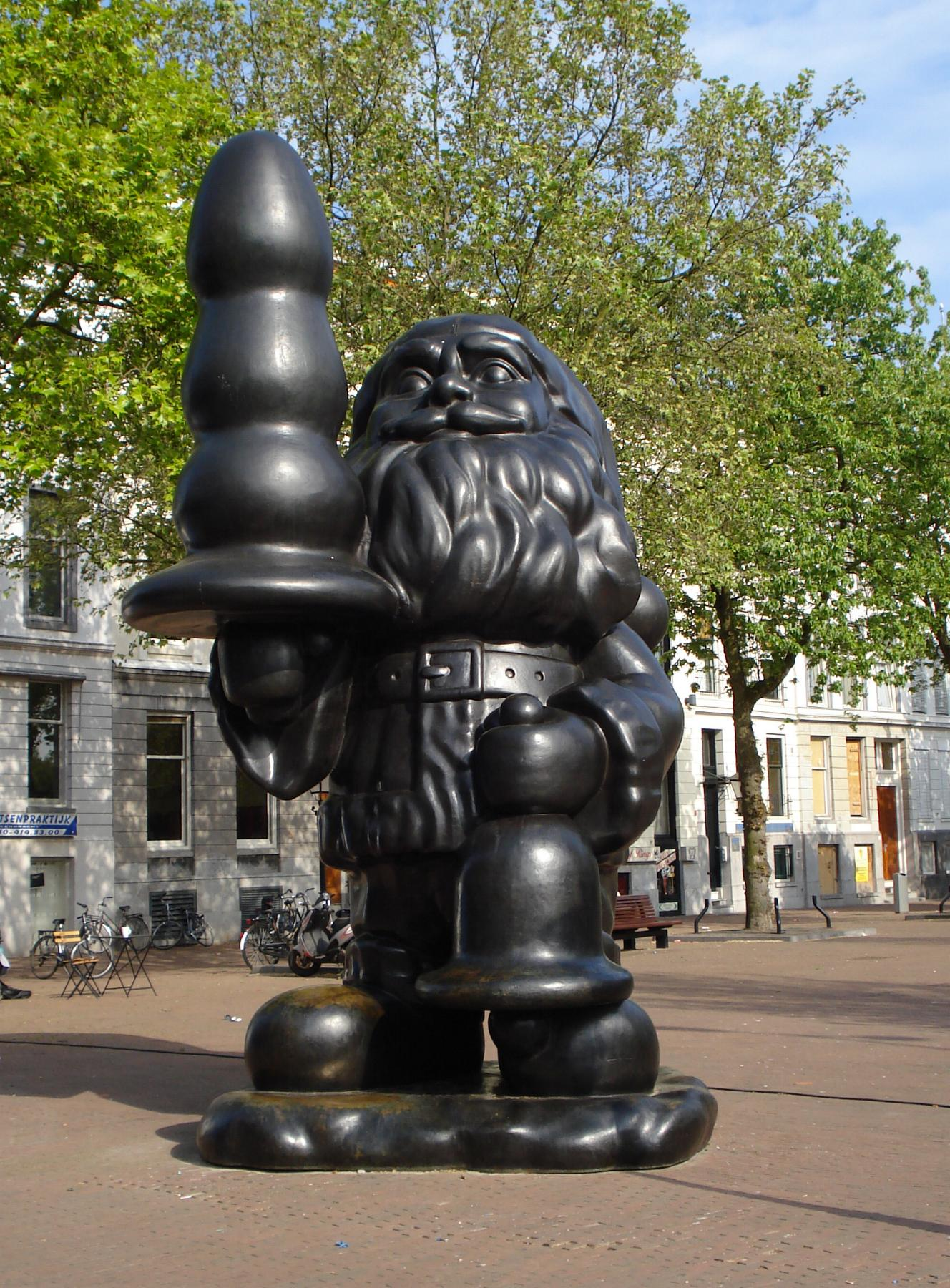
Santa Claus on the Eendrachtsplein, Rotterdam

Santa Claus, popularly known as the Buttplug Gnome, is a 2001 statue by artist Paul McCarthy in the Eendrachtsplein square of Rotterdam, The Netherlands.

Originally made for the International Sculpture Collection, its intended location was outside the De Doelen concert hall. However, it has been located in various places – including the courtyard of the Boijmans Museum – but was moved due to protests from local businesses. Officially, the work represents Santa Claus holding a Christmas tree in his hands, but the artist has implied that it could also represent a buttplug, stating, "...For me, the sculpture is also about the consumer community - as a commentary on material consumption in the Western world." A red version was unveiled in May 2018 in Oslo, Norway. The unveiling was performed by a man, suspended by an overhead crane with hooks through his skin, who pulled off the cover.

== See also ==
- Tree – An installation by McCarthy
