= Paul McCarthy =

American artist (born 1945)

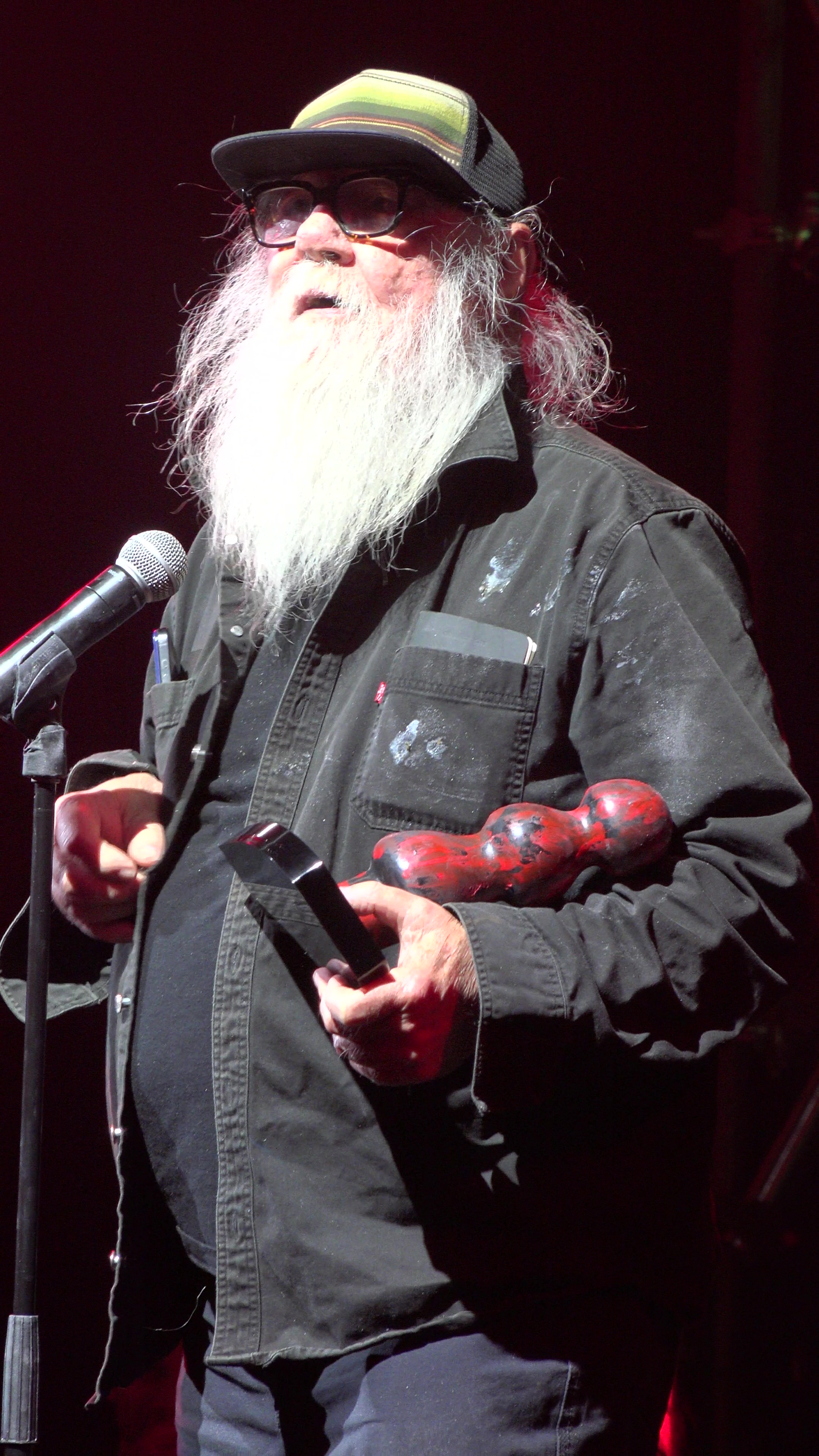
- McCarthy in 2026
- Born: August 4, 1945 (age 81); Salt Lake City, Utah, U.S.
- Education: San Francisco Art Institute; University of Southern California
- Known for: Performance art; sculpture
- Notable work: Sailor's Meat (1975); The Garden (1991); Bossy Burger (1991); Santa Claus (2001); Tree (2014)

Paul McCarthy (born August 4, 1945) is an American artist who lives and works in Los Angeles, California.

== Life ==
McCarthy was born in Salt Lake City, Utah, in 1945. He studied art at Weber State University in Ogden, Utah, and later continued to study at the University of Utah until 1969. He went on to study at the San Francisco Art Institute, receiving a BFA in painting. In 1972 he studied film, video, and art at the University of Southern California, receiving an MFA. From 1982 to 2002 he taught performance, video, installation, and performance art history at the University of California, Los Angeles. McCarthy currently works mainly in video and sculpture.

Originally formally trained as a painter, McCarthy's main interest lies in everyday activities and the mess created by them. Much of his work in the late 1960s, such as Mountain Bowling (1969) and Hold an Apple in Your Armpit (1970), are similar to the work of Happenings founder Allan Kaprow, with whom McCarthy had a professional relationship.

McCarthy is a founding member of the experimental music group Extended Organ, formed in the early 90s and aligned with the Los Angeles Free Music Society (LAFMS). Extended Organ originally also featured Mike Kelley, Fredrik Nilsen, Joe Potts, and Tom Recchion. After Kelley's death, Alex Stevens joined the group. They have released several albums and have appeared live in the US and Europe.

McCarthy's Altadena home was destroyed in the Eaton Fire, one of the January 2025 Southern California wildfires.

== Work ==
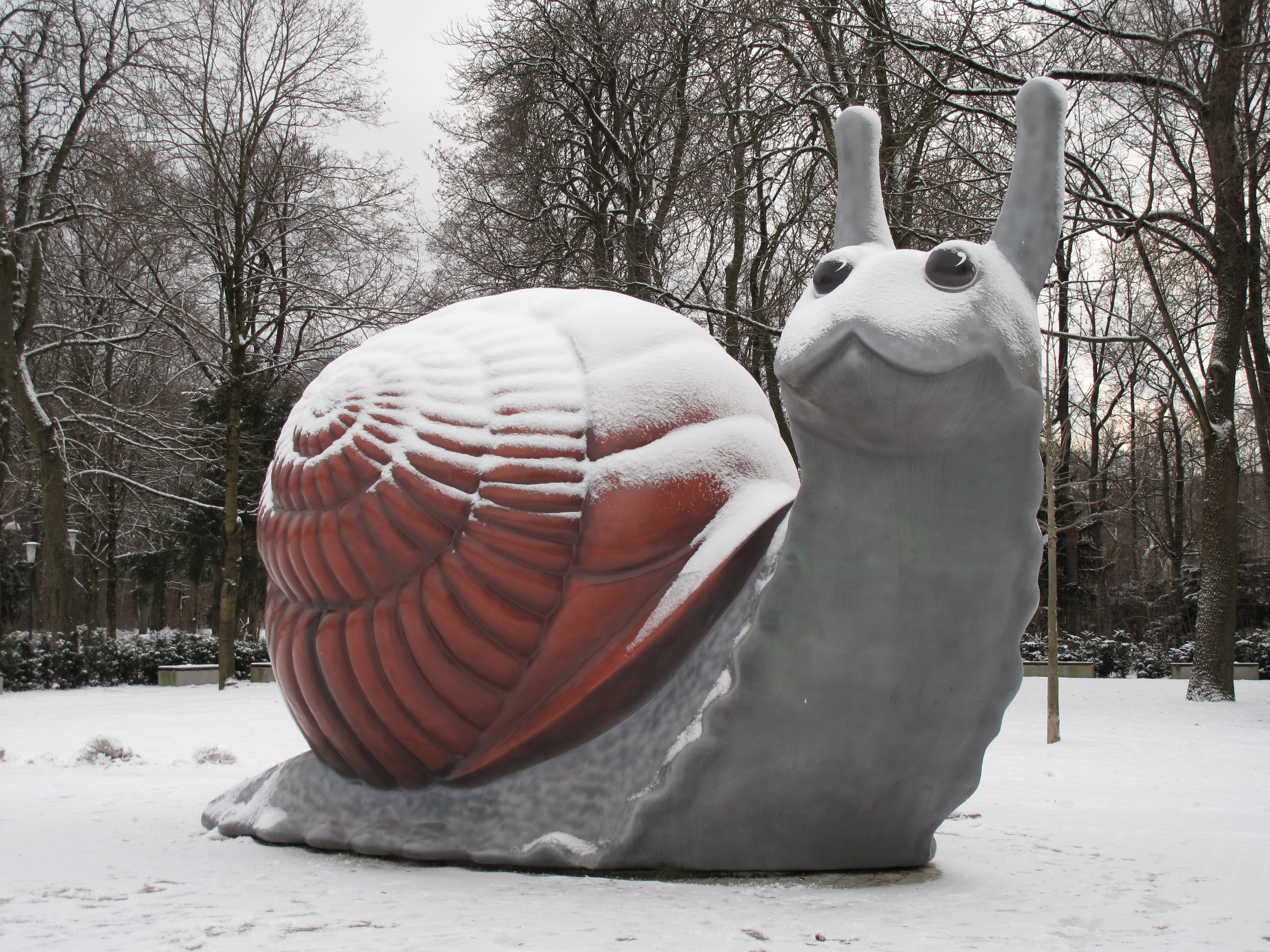
Sweet Brown Snail by Jason Rhoades and Paul McCarthy at the Bavariapark and the Verkehrszentrum of the Deutsches Museum in Munich

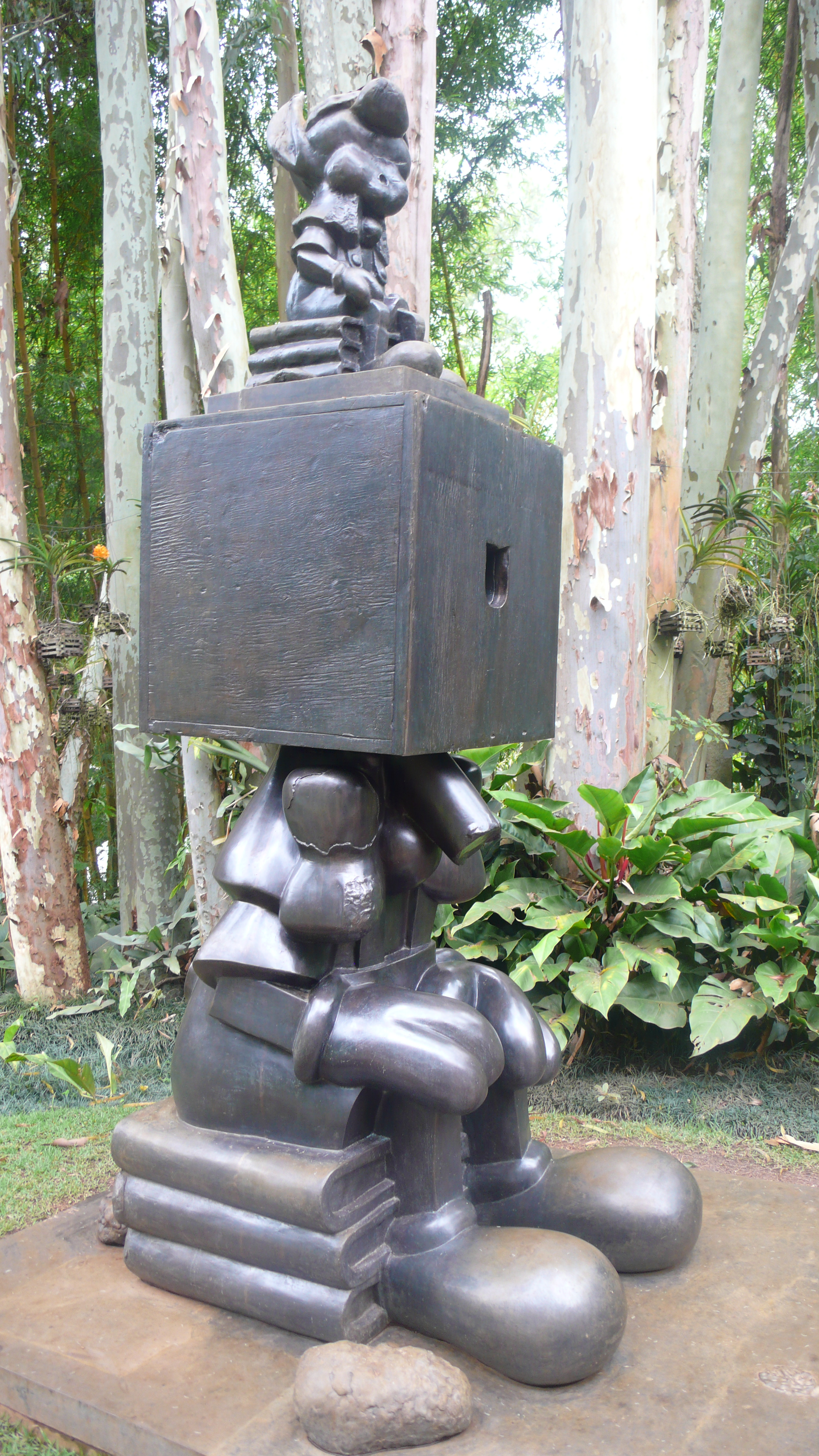
Boxhead (2001), collection of the Centro de Arte Contemporânea Inhotim in Brumadinho/Brazil

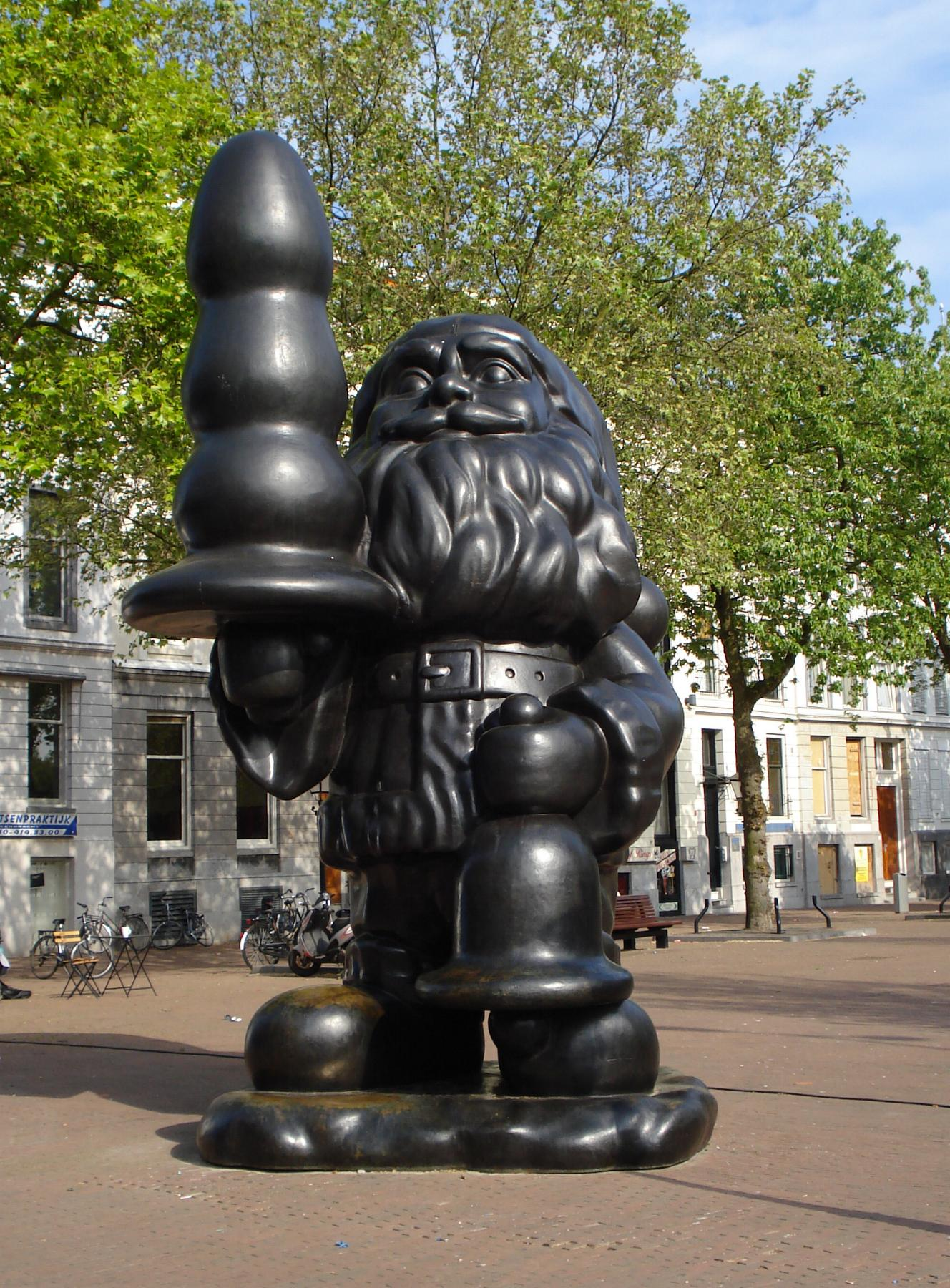
Santa Claus (2001) on the Eendrachtsplein in Rotterdam, the Netherlands

McCarthy's works include performance, sculpture, installation, film, and "painting as action". His points of reference are rooted, on the one hand, in things typically American, such as Disneyland, B-Movies, Soap Operas and Comics – he is a critical analyst of the mass media and consumer-driven American society and its hypocrisy, double standards, and repression. On the other hand, it is European avant-garde art that has had the most influence on his artistic form language. Such influences include the Lost Art Movement, Joseph Beuys, Sigmund Freud, Samuel Beckett, and the Viennese Actionism.

I started making videotapes in the early 1970s. The first ones were around perception and illusion. The camera was upside down, or I'd use mirrors, things like that. But I also started making pieces that were performances in the sense that I would be in front of the camera. I would work in the studio primarily by myself with the camera. There was not much in the room. I would do some things and record them. They were often repetitious and intuitive. Ma Bell was one of the first actions that I did which involved liquids, in this case, motor oil. I had not planned to make the piece. It was spontaneous. It was the first tape where there was a persona.

Although by his own statement the happenings of the Viennese Actionists were known to him in the 1970s, he sees a clear difference between the actions of the Viennese and his own performances:

Vienna is not Los Angeles. My work came out of kids' television in Los Angeles. I didn't go through Catholicism and World War II as a teenager, I didn't live in a European environment. People make references to Viennese art without really questioning the fact that there is a big difference between ketchup and blood. I never thought of my work as shamanistic. My work is more about being a clown than a shaman.

In his early works, McCarthy sought to break the limitations of painting by using the body as a paintbrush or even canvas; later, he incorporated bodily fluids or food as substitutes into his works. In a 1974 video, Sauce, he painted with his head and face, "smearing his body with paint and then with ketchup, mayonnaise or raw meat and, in one case, feces." This clearly resembled the work of Vienna actionist Günter Brus. Similarly, his work evolved from painting to transgressive performance art, psychosexual events intended to fly in the face of social convention, testing the emotional limits of both artist and viewer. An example of this is his 1976 piece Class Fool, where McCarthy threw himself around a ketchup-spattered classroom at the University of California, San Diego until dazed and self-injured. He then vomited several times and inserted a Barbie doll into his rectum. The piece ended when the audience could no longer stand to watch his performance. Concerned that the University's custodians would have to clean up the mess, graduate students Virginia Maksymowicz and Blaise Tobia, along with art historian Moira Roth, spent several hours cleaning up the ketchup and vomit. Maksymowicz can be seen in the rear left of a documentary photo of the event.

McCarthy's works in the 1990s, such as Bossy Burger (1991) and Painter (1995), often seeks to undermine the idea of "the myth of artistic greatness" and attacks the perception of the heroic male artist.

McCarthy's transfixion with Johanna Spyri's novel Heidi led to his 1992 video and installation Heidi: Midlife Crisis Trauma Center and Negative Media-Engram Abreaction Release Zone, on which he collaborated with Mike Kelley.

Caribbean Pirates (2001–05), alludes to the Johnny Depp film franchise and to the Disneyland attraction.

=== Complex Shit ===
During the summer of 2008, Paul McCarthy's inflatable Complex Shit, installed on the grounds of the Paul Klee Centre in Bern, Switzerland, took off in a wind, bringing down a power line, breaking a greenhouse window and a window at a children's home. This incident was widely reported internationally via news outlets in several languages with headlines like "Huge turd catastrophe for museum" and "Up in the sky: is it a turd or a plane?"

=== Santa Claus ===
McCarthy has created several Christmas-themed works. Through them, he combined his impressions of the dismal aesthetic and the real meaning of Christmas. In 2001, he created Santa Claus for the city of Rotterdam in the Netherlands. Originally, it was intended to be placed next to the concert hall at the locally famous "Schouwburgplein" square, but it never was. This was due to controversies around the statue: The work is seen by many citizens as having sexual connotations, and, therefore it also is colloquially called "Kabouter Buttplug" and "Butt plug Gnome". Its original location was rejected by citizens and retailers, as well as several other proposed locations. On November 28, 2008, it did, however, receive a permanent destination on the Eendrachtsplein square, within a walkway-of-statues project.

=== White Snow ===
In November 2009, an exhibition called "White Snow" was held at Hauser & Wirth New York, featuring McCarthy's mixed-media works, centered on the character Snow White from Disney's Snow White and the Seven Dwarfs.

=== Tree ===
In October 2014, McCarthy unveiled Tree in Place Vendôme in Paris. The inflatable sculpture, standing 24 meters tall, was said to resemble a large green butt plug. This caused controversy among citizens, who believed their historic square had been sullied. Within two days the piece had been deflated by someone, and McCarthy stated that he did not want it to be repaired or replaced. He also admitted to Le Monde that its butt plug shape was deliberate, and a "joke". In 2016 he again exhibited Tree at Paramount Ranch 3, amongst the trees and rolling hills of the Santa Monica Mountains, where the reception was positive and visitors "reveled in its absurdist glory".

=== Tomato Head ===
In 1994, McCarthy made one of his most important works of the 1990s, Tomato Head. McCarthy created a life size comic figure exploring the relationship between modern culture, innocence and consumerism. In a way this piece pays homage to the iconic children's toy Mr. Potato Head as McCarthy's human figure has an enlarged cartoonish red tomato as its head, transforming a child's toy into a sinister work of art.

== See also ==
- Criticism of capitalism
- Social effects of television
- Americana
