= Rectal dilator =

Medical device

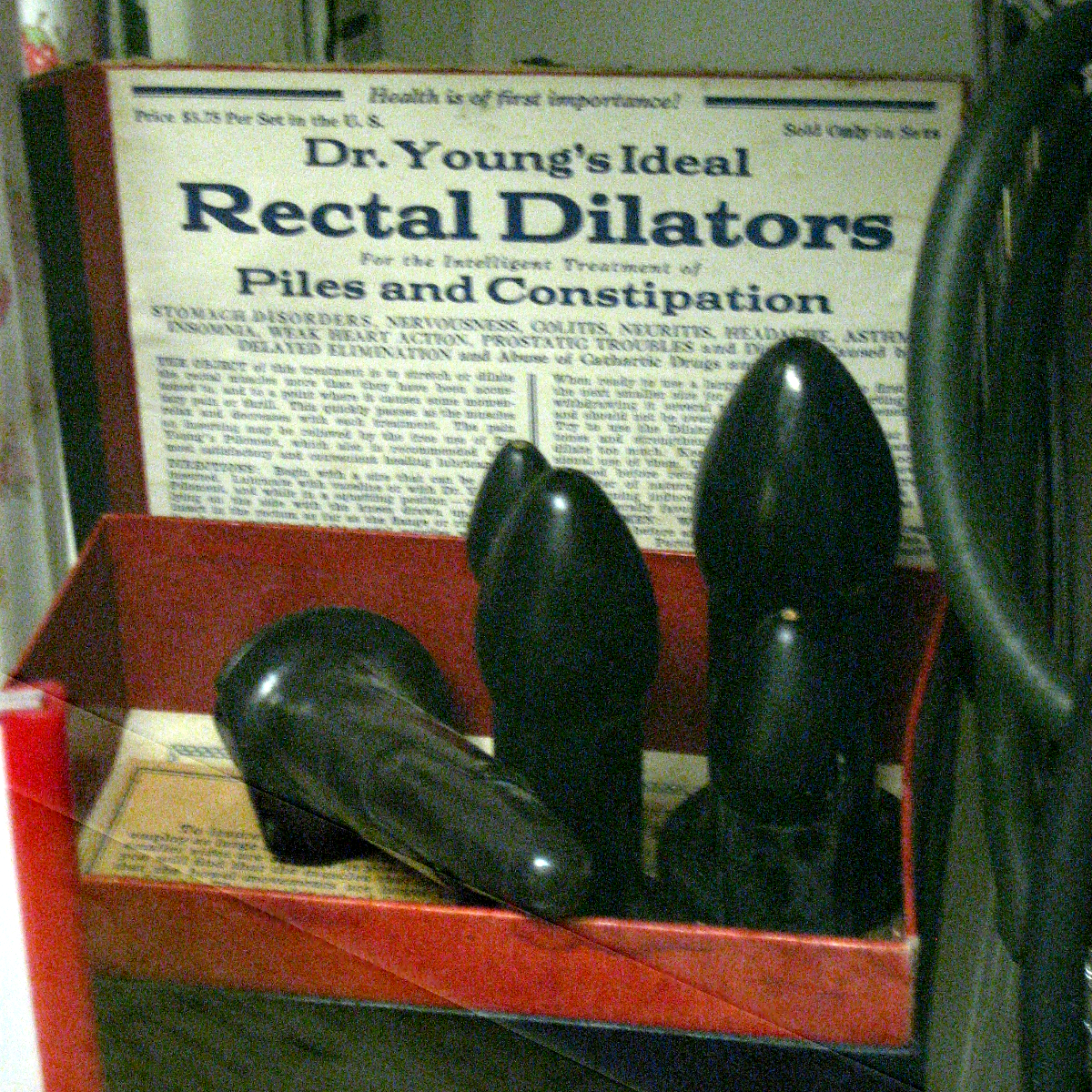
A set of antique rectal dilators exhibited at Glore Psychiatric Museum.

A rectal or anal dilator is a medical device similar to a speculum designed to open and relax the internal/external anal sphincter and rectum in order to facilitate medical inspection or relieve constipation. One early version of a rectal dilator was Dr. Young's Ideal Rectal Dilators, invented in 1892.

Rectal dilators are also used as sex toys.

== See also ==
- Anal plug, a medical device for treating anal incontinence
- Butt plug, a sex toy resembling an anal dilator
- Proctoscope, another medical device inserted anally
- Vaginal dilator, an equivalent device for dilating the vagina
