= Sound (medical instrument) =

Tool for probing passages in the body

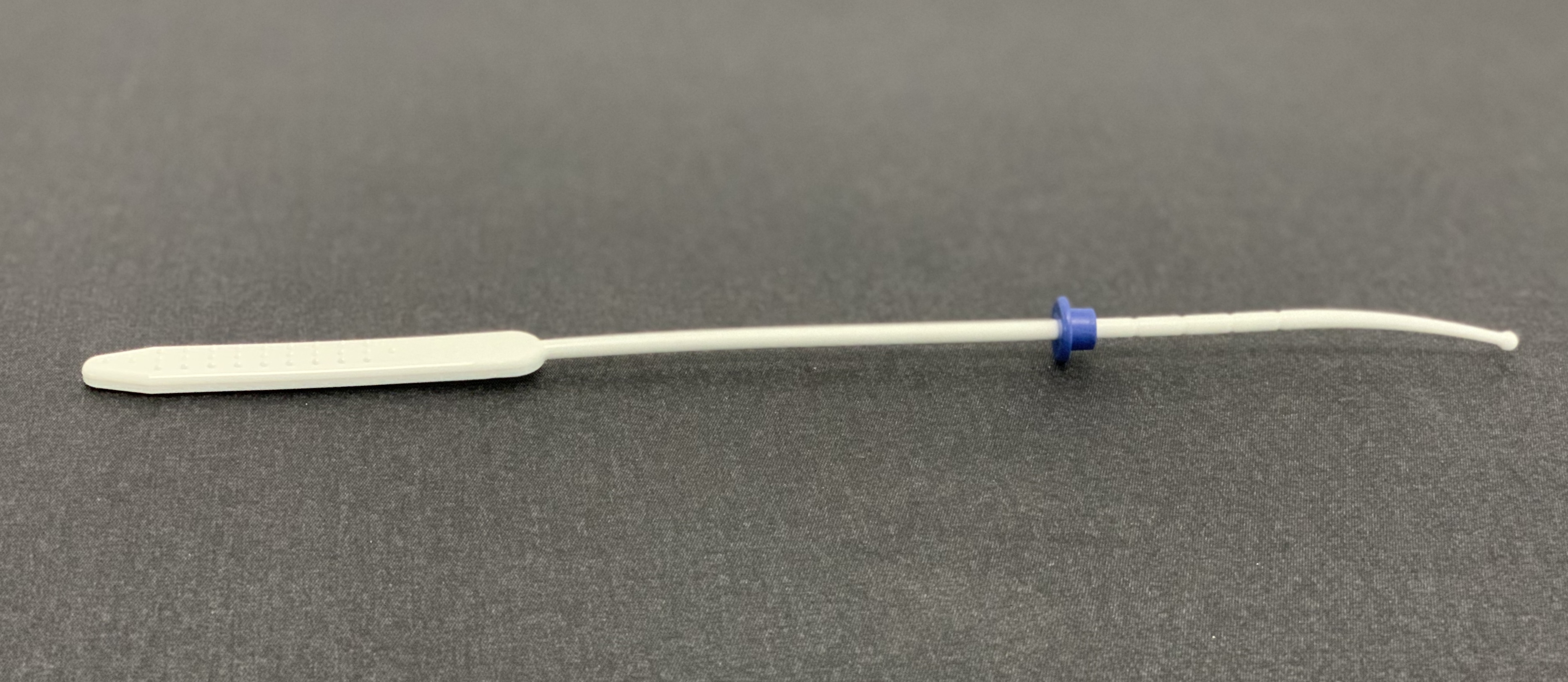
- Uterine sound
- [edit on Wikidata]

In medicine, a sound (/saʊnd/), also called a sonde (/sɒnd/), (Note: The words sound and sonde in the sense of a probe for exploring something, which are cognate, come from the original type of sounding, depth sounding, the process of determining the depth of water under a boat or ship by sending a sounding line (lead line) to the bottom. The root of the words is Germanic, but Modern English borrowed from French sonde in producing the modern forms, in both loanword and anglicised versions. Today a sonde can be any of various probes for exploring the sea, the atmosphere, the human body, or other animal bodies (for example, a sondes for water quality, radiosondes, rocketsondes, urethral sondes).) is an instrument for probing and dilating passages within the body, the best-known examples of which are urethral sounds and uterine sounds.

== Urethral sounds ==
Urethral inserted into the male or female urethra, for the purpose of stretching or unblocking a stricture. There are a number of different types of urethral sounds:

- Bakes sounds, also known as rosebud or bullet sounds, have a long thin metal rod with a bulbous bud on the end.
- Dittel sounds have a flat end and a rounded end.
- Hank sounds have a more pronounced curve at the ends, as well as a metal rib on each end.
- Pratt sounds are longer urethral dilators (double ended ones are usually almost a foot long) with rounded and slightly bent ends.
- Van Buren sounds have very pronounced tips and applicators

== Uterine sounds ==
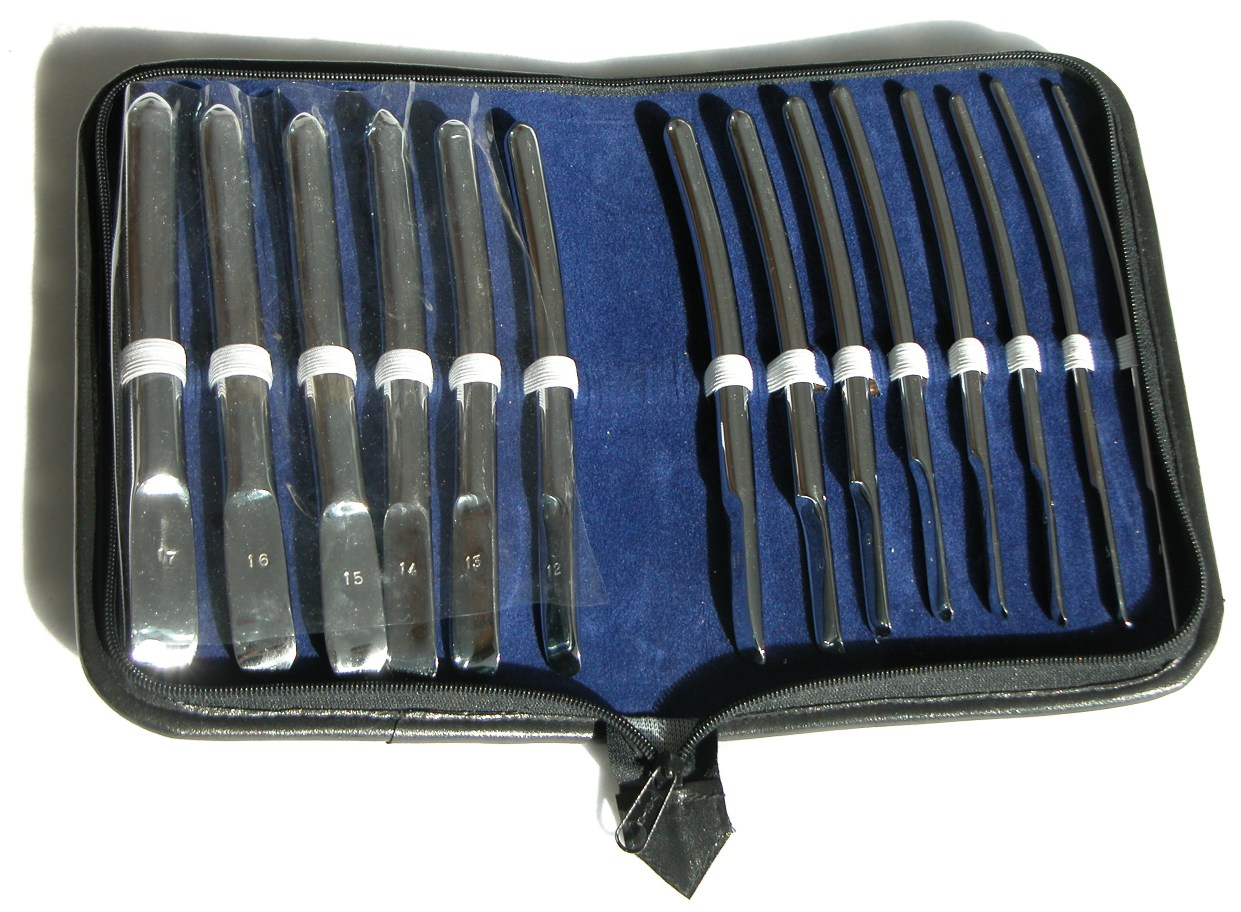
Uterine dilators of Hegar type, from diameters 4 mm (right) to 17 mm (left)

These sounds are intended for probing a woman's uterus through the cervix, to measure the length and direction of the cervical canal and uterus. Dilators are primarily used to open and dilate the cervix to gain access to the uterine cavity, but can also be used as sounds.

Uterine sounding may be performed prior to embryo transfer to determine the uterine depth and how easily an embryo transfer catheter can be passed through the cervix. In this case, it may also be called a trial transfer. It is performed prior to insertion of an intrauterine device (IUD) in order to measure the length and direction of the cervical canal and uterus. This reduces the risk of perforating the uterus with the IUD. This may occur when the IUD is inserted too deeply or at the wrong angle.

Different types of Uterine sounds include the following:

- Hegar dilators have two rounded ends, are fairly short, and are mildly curved in shape.
- Sims sounds have a flat end and a rounded end.

== See also ==
- French catheter scale
- Anal probe
- Dilator
- Urethral sounding
