= Dr. Young's Ideal Rectal Dilators =

Medical device

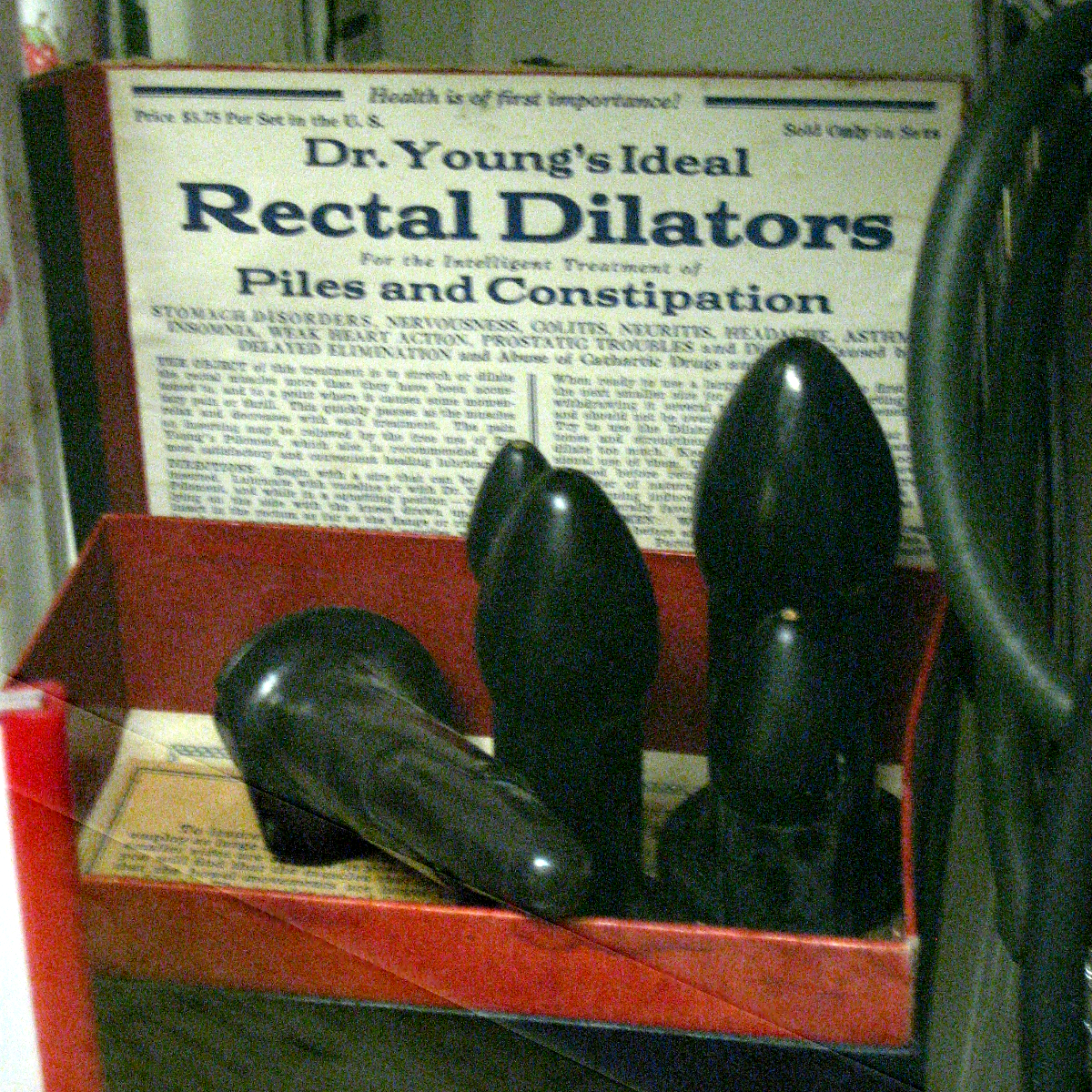
A set of Dr. Young's Ideal Rectal Dilators

Dr. Young's Ideal Rectal Dilators were medical devices sold in the United States from the late nineteenth century until at least the 1940s, part of the burgeoning market for patent and proprietary medicines and devices at the time. They came in sets of four "torpedolike" hard rubber (later, plastic) instruments varying in diameter from 1/2 inch (12.7 mm) to 1 inch (25.4 mm) and in length from 3 to 4 inches (76.2 to 101.6 mm), and according to a retrospective article in The American Journal of Gastroenterology, were no different from modern rectal dilators.

== Early claims and criticism ==
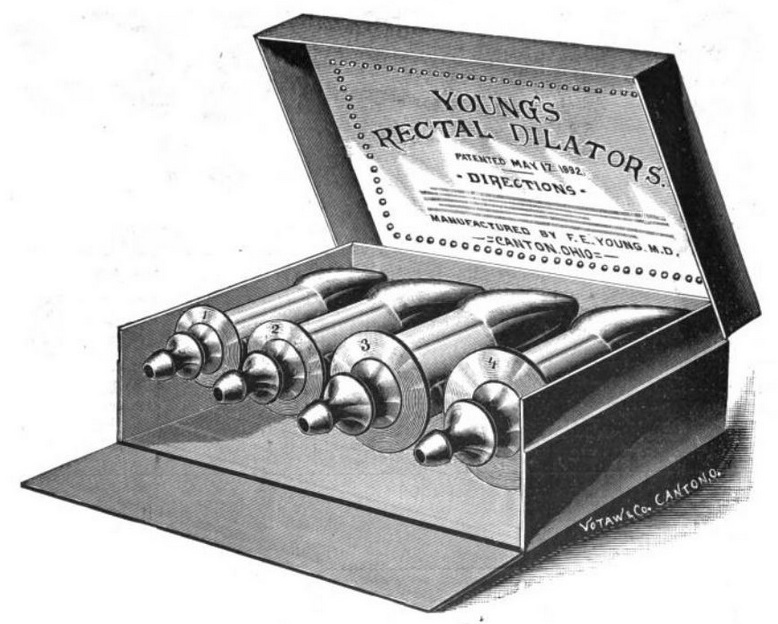
The New Way, September 1893. The case, according to this advertisement, was "handsome and permanent."

An 1893 Medical News editorial noted that "Dr. Young" himself, writing in another journal of which he was the editor, praised rectal dilation as a cure for insanity, claiming that at least "three-fourths of all the howling maniacs of the world" were curable "in a few weeks' time by the application of orificial methods". The Medical News asked,

Why, then, in the name of pity and kindness, do these men not apply the dilators each to himself or to each other? We very much fear all this imbecility may rest upon a semi-pathologic basis, and that Krafft-Ebing may have a new chapter to write concerning sodomic perversion in his work upon sexual psychopathy.

A 1905 advertisement by F. E. Young and Co. of Chicago promised that "The best results may be obtained by the use of Young's self-retaining rectal dilators", the use of which "accomplishes for the invalid just what nature does daily for the healthy individual". Doctors were advised that "If you will prescribe a set of these dilators in some of your obstinate cases of Chronic Constipation you will find them necessary in every case of this kind". The price of a set "to the profession" was $2.50 (equivalent to $90 in 2025).

Young admitted that some patients panicked at the sight of the devices.

== Condemnation by Food and Drug Administration ==
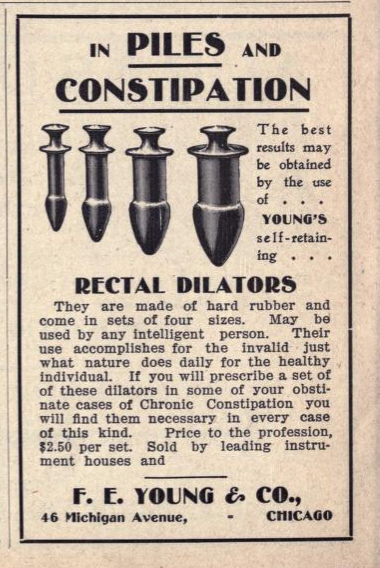
Detroit Medical Journal, August 1905

In 1940 the United States Attorney for the Southern District of New York seized a shipment of the devices as misbranded. According to the U.S. Food and Drug Administration's subsequent Drugs and Devices Court Case Notice of Judgment (captioned "U.S. v. 67 Sets of Dr. Young's Rectal Dilators and 83 Packages of Dr. Young's Piloment") the product's labeling claimed it corrected constipation, promoted more refreshing sleep, and could relieve foul breath, bad taste in the mouth, sallow skin, acne, anemia, lassitude, mental hebetude, insomnia, anorexia, headaches, diarrhea, hemorrhoids, flatulence, indigestion, nervousness, irritability, cold extremities, and numerous other ailments. The instructions warned, "Do not neglect to use your Dilators ... It is advisable to use [them] occasionally as a precautionary measure. You need have no fear of using them too much."

The devices were held to be "dangerous to health when used with the frequency and duration prescribed, recommended or suggested in the labeling", and the shipment was ordered to be destroyed.

== See also ==
- Butt plug
