= Vaginal dilator =

Medical instrument used to stretch the vagina

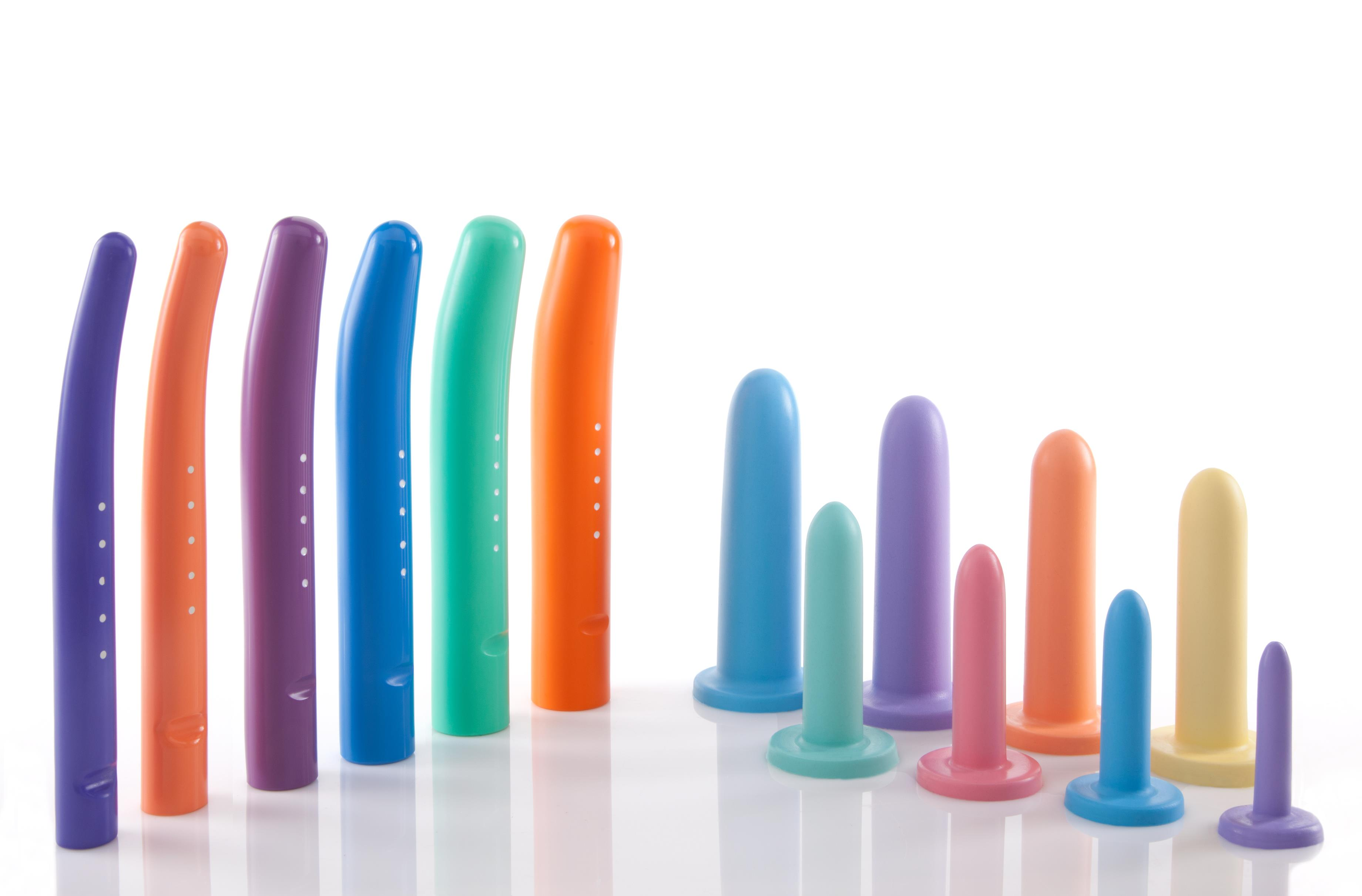
Plastic and silicone vaginal dilators

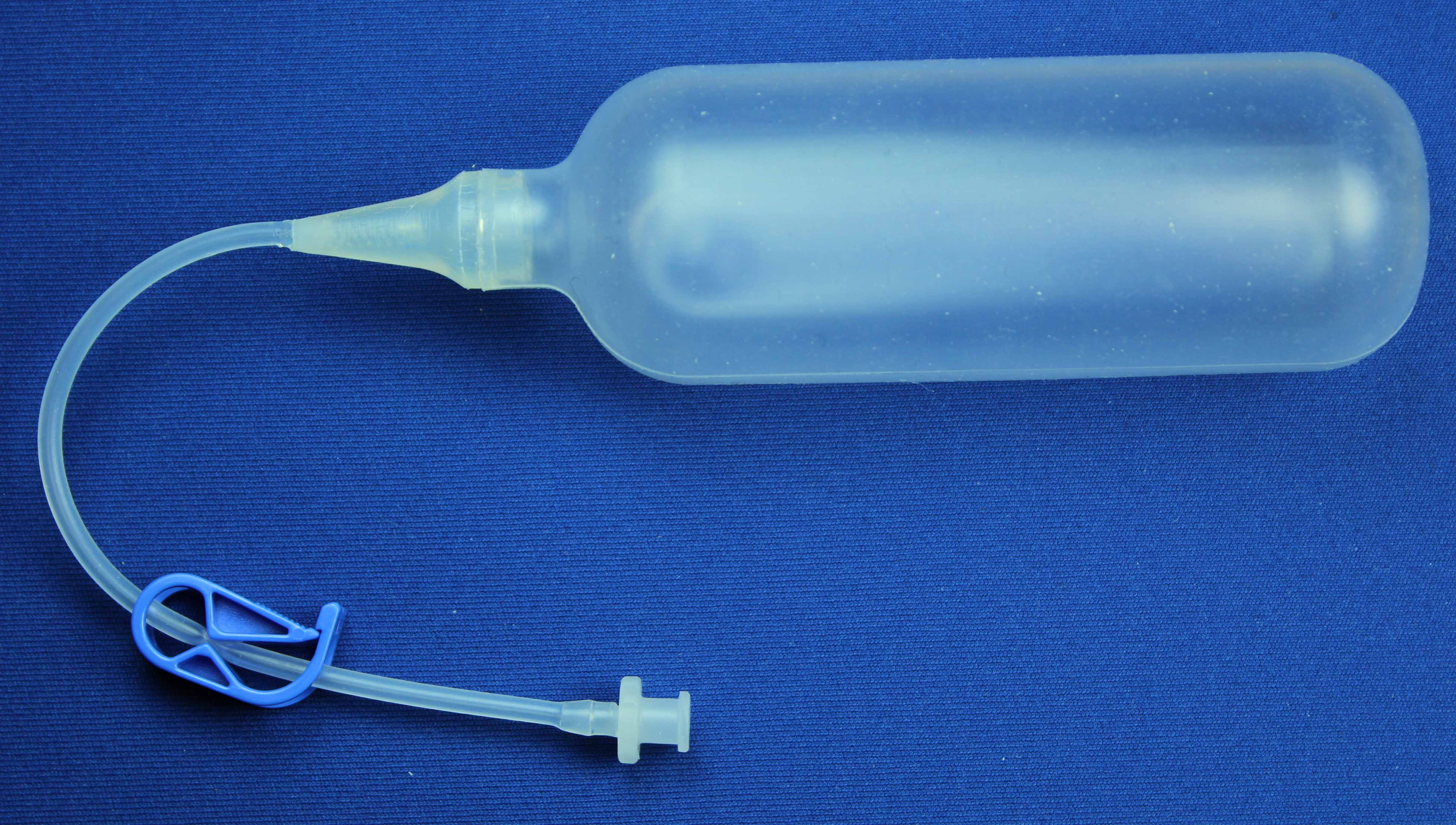
ZSI 200 NS vaginal expander

A vaginal dilator, sometimes called a vaginal trainer, vaginal stent or vaginal expander, is an instrument used to gently stretch the vagina. They are used when the vagina has become narrowed (vaginal stenosis), such as after brachytherapy for gynecologic cancers, as therapy for vaginismus and other forms of dyspareunia, and to maintain the neovaginal canal following gender-affirming surgery.

There is evidence for dilator use across many different diagnoses with fair to good results. This includes following cancer treatments and for vaginal agenesis conditions. The evidence presents varying approaches and protocols.

Vaginal dilators can be solid or inflatable and are commonly used during surgeries. Vaginal stents are routinely used in surgery and postoperative care for transgender women who are undergoing gender-affirming vaginoplasty to form a neovagina. The vaginal expander is used immediately after surgery to keep the passage from collapsing, and regularly thereafter to maintain the viability of the neovagina. Frequency of use requirements decrease over time, but remains obligatory lifelong.

== Use ==
With solid vaginal dilators, the patient starts with the smallest dilator size, then gradually increasing until the largest dilator size is reached. This practice can be accompanied by breathing exercises in order to relax the pelvic floor muscles. Dilation acts should not cause pain or bleeding. Dilatation with rigid dilators must be done carefully as vaginal perforation and urethral injury may occur. There is no consensus on the frequency and duration of using vaginal dilators. In case of vaginal expanders, the therapist or the patient introduces the deflated balloon into the vagina and then inflates it gently until the required diameter is obtained.

Following gender-affirming vaginoplasty, patients may be required to use vaginal dilators multiple times daily to maintain the depth and length of the neovagina. Different size dilators may be used, typically starting with a smaller diameter and increasing the size over the course of several weeks post-surgery. Over time the frequency of dilation can be reduced to daily and eventually to every few days as instructed by surgeons.

== Image gallery ==
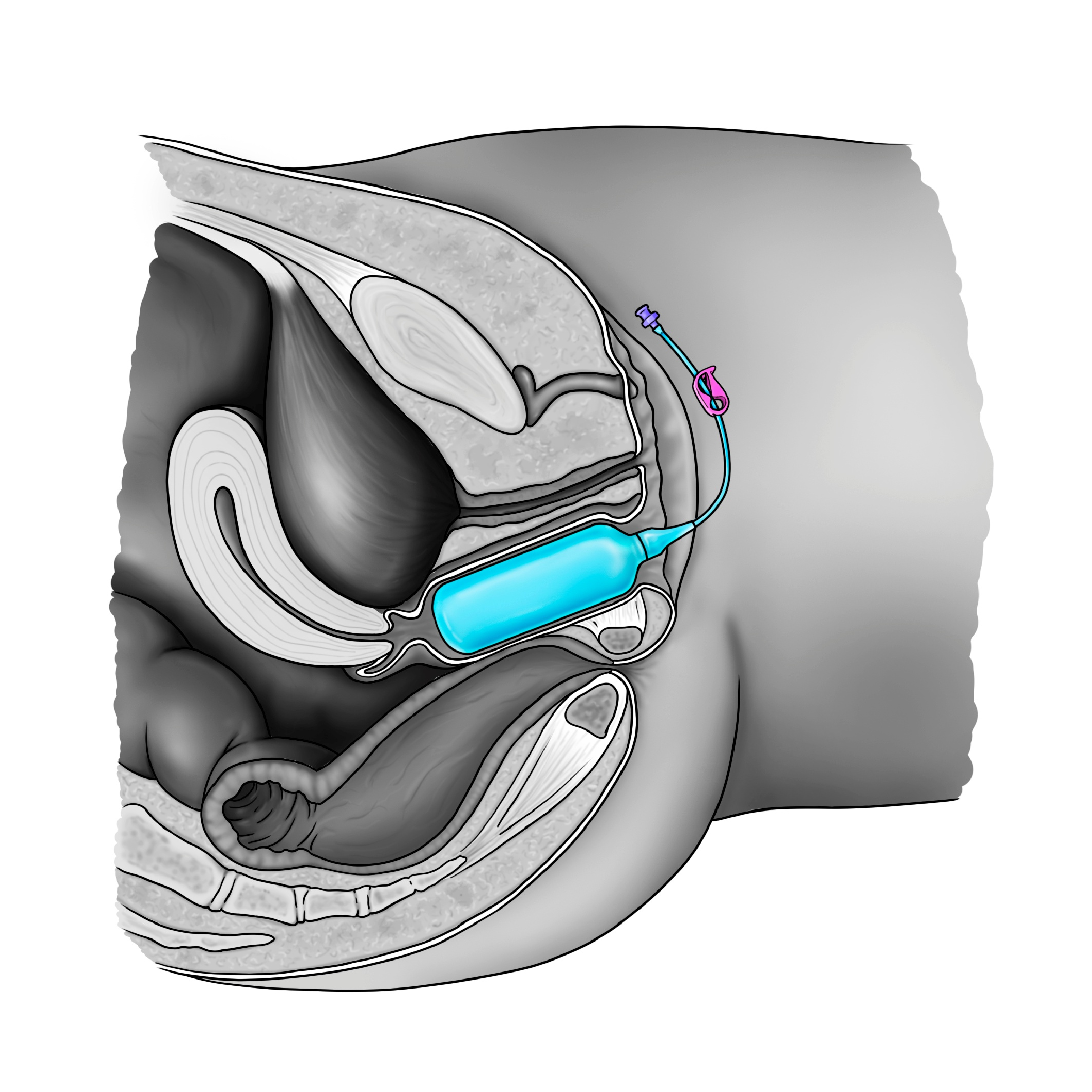
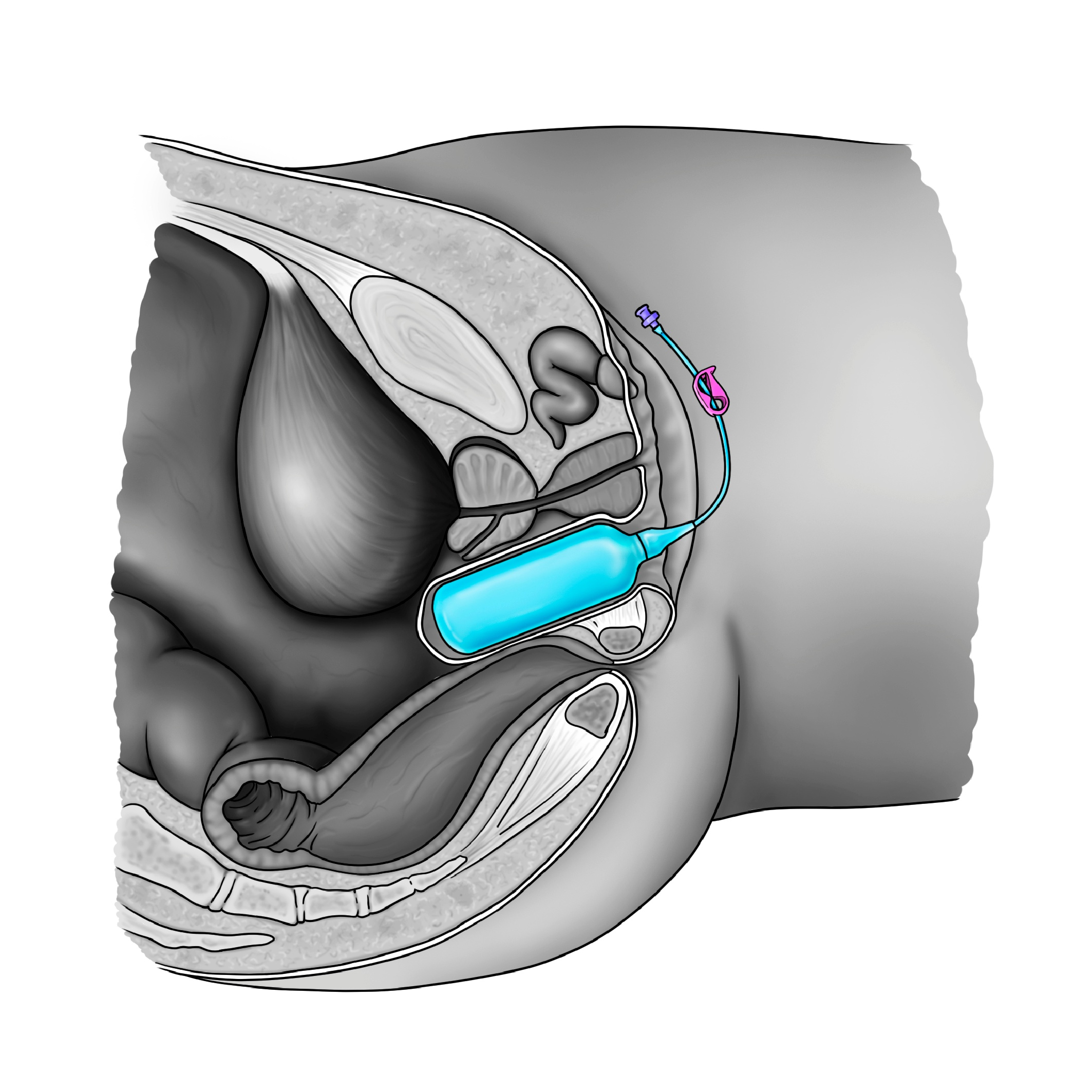
Diagrams of ZSI 200 NS vaginal expanders placed in the natal vagina (left) and in the neovagina after vaginoplasty (right)

== In popular culture ==
Vaginal dilators appear in the comedy feature film Lady Parts, as the main character struggles with vaginismus after receiving a vestibulectomy.

== See also ==
- Dilator (medical instrument)
- Dildo
- Rectal dilator
- Vaginoplasty
