= List of stars in Canis Minor =

This is the list of notable stars in the constellation Canis Minor, sorted by decreasing brightness.

Name	B	F	Var	HD	HIP	RA	Dec	vis. mag.	abs. mag.	Dist. (ly)	Sp. class	Notes
Procyon	α	10		61421	37279	07^{h} 39^{m} 18.54^{s}	+05° 13′ 39.0″	0.34	2.65	11	F5IV-V	Antecanis, Al Shira, Elgomaisa; 7th brightest star, 13th nearest star system; binary; suspected variable, V_{max} = 0.34^{m}, V_{min} = 0.41^{m}
β CMi	β	3		58715	36188	07^{h} 27^{m} 09.07^{s}	+08° 17′ 21.9″	2.89	−0.70	170	B8Vvar	Gomeisa; γ Cas variable, V_{max} = 2.84^{m}, V_{min} = 2.92^{m}
γ CMi	γ	4		58972	36284	07^{h} 28^{m} 09.83^{s}	+08° 55′ 31.8″	4.33	−1.10	318	K3III SB	semiregular variable, V_{max} = 4.30^{m}, V_{min} = 4.34^{m}, P = 55 d
HD 66141	(λ) (Note: Bode's λ of both Argo and Canis Minor.)	(13) (Note: Flamsteed's 13th of Navis (13 Nav).)		66141	39311	08^{h} 02^{m} 15.95^{s}	+02° 20′ 03.5″	4.39	−0.13	261	K2III	suspected variable; has a planet (b)
6 CMi	ο (Note: Labelled Omicron Canis Minoris (ο CMi/ο Canis Minoris) by Bode in his Uranographia)	6		59294	36425	07^{h} 29^{m} 47.78^{s}	+12° 00′ 23.8″	4.55	−1.63	560	K2III	suspected variable, V_{max} = 4.48^{m}, V_{min} = 4.55^{m}
ε CMi	ε	2		58367	36041	07^{h} 25^{m} 38.90^{s}	+09° 16′ 34.0″	4.99	−2.42	988	G8III	
ζ CMi	ζ	13		63975	38373	07^{h} 51^{m} 42.00^{s}	+01° 46′ 00.8″	5.12	−0.43	420	B8II	
η CMi	η	5		58923	36265	07^{h} 28^{m} 02.08^{s}	+06° 56′ 31.5″	5.22	0.06	351	F0III	
δ^{1} CMi	δ^{1}	7		59881	36641	07^{h} 32^{m} 05.95^{s}	+01° 54′ 52.1″	5.24	−1.67	787	F0III	
11 CMi	π (Note: Labelled Pi Canis Minoris (π CMi/π Canis Minoris) by Bode in his Uranographia)	11		62832	37921	07^{h} 46^{m} 16.22^{s}	+10° 46′ 05.9″	5.25	0.34	312	A1Vnn	
14 CMi		14		65345	38962	07^{h} 58^{m} 20.75^{s}	+02° 13′ 28.3″	5.30	0.75	264	K0III	
HD 55751				55751	34987	07^{h} 14^{m} 20.07^{s}	+03° 06′ 41.1″	5.36	−1.45	749	K0III	
1 CMi		1		58187	35987	07^{h} 24^{m} 58.19^{s}	+11° 40′ 10.4″	5.37	0.43	317	A5IV	
δ^{2} CMi	δ^{2}	8		60111	36723	07^{h} 33^{m} 11.68^{s}	+03° 17′ 25.0″	5.59	2.44	139	F2V	
HD 65900	σ (Note: Labelled Sigma Canis Minoris (σ CMi/σ Canis Minoris) by Bode in his Uranographia)			65900	39213	08^{h} 01^{m} 13.91^{s}	+04° 52′ 47.2″	5.65	0.52	346	A1V	
HD 55730				55730	35005	07^{h} 14^{m} 32.65^{s}	+12° 06′ 57.1″	5.71	0.68	331	G6III	
HD 54079				54079	34387	07^{h} 07^{m} 49.48^{s}	+07° 28′ 16.7″	5.74	−0.47	568	K0III:	
HD 56031				56031	35120	07^{h} 15^{m} 39.42^{s}	+07° 58′ 39.9″	5.78	−0.56	604	M4III	semiregular variable, ΔV = 0.08^{m}
δ^{3} CMi	δ^{3}	9		60357	36812	07^{h} 34^{m} 15.89^{s}	+03° 22′ 18.3″	5.83	−0.75	676	A0Vnn	
HD 64685				64685	38712	07^{h} 55^{m} 31.44^{s}	+08° 51′ 47.0″	5.86	2.95	124	F2IV	
HD 60803				60803	37031	07^{h} 36^{m} 34.77^{s}	+05° 51′ 43.6″	5.89	2.69	142	G0V	binary
HD 56989				56989	35476	07^{h} 19^{m} 22.37^{s}	+02° 44′ 26.6″	5.90	−0.11	520	G9III	
HD 57006				57006	35509	07^{h} 19^{m} 47.61^{s}	+07° 08′ 35.1″	5.91	2.04	193	F8IV	
HD 61887				61887	37478	07^{h} 41^{m} 35.16^{s}	+03° 37′ 29.4″	5.95	0.00	504	A0V	
HD 57608				57608	35712	07^{h} 22^{m} 03.48^{s}	+00° 10′ 37.7″	5.99	−5.08	5344	B8III	
HD 61563				61563		07^{h} 40^{m} 06.99^{s}	+05° 13′ 52.2″	6.07	-0.26	670	A0IV+A0IV	binary
HD 65066	κ (Note: Labelled Kappa Canis Minoris (κ CMi/κ Canis Minoris) by Bode in his Uranographia)			65066	38868	07^{h} 57^{m} 15.88^{s}	+08° 38′ 28.6″	6.03	1.25	294	K0III	
HD 55111				55111	34768	07^{h} 11^{m} 51.39^{s}	+05° 39′ 17.0″	6.07	−0.83	782	A1V	
HD 55184				55184	34789	07^{h} 12^{m} 07.50^{s}	+05° 28′ 27.7″	6.15	−0.67	753	K0III	
HD 64938	ι (Note: Labelled Iota Canis Minoris (ι CMi/ι Canis Minoris) by Bode in his Uranographia)			64938	38794	07^{h} 56^{m} 23.91^{s}	+04° 29′ 08.1″	6.16	−0.91	845	G8III	
HD 62264				62264	37614	07^{h} 43^{m} 05.42^{s}	+00° 11′ 21.7″	6.17	0.46	453	K0III	
HD 63799				63799	38300	07^{h} 50^{m} 47.36^{s}	+03° 16′ 38.4″	6.17	0.81	384	K1III	
HD 66011				66011	39271	08^{h} 01^{m} 50.73^{s}	+08° 54′ 50.2″	6.22	2.34	194	G0IV	
HD 60275	ν (Note: Labelled Nu Canis Minoris (ν CMi/ν Canis Minoris) by Bode in his Uranographia)			60275	36796	07^{h} 34^{m} 04.98^{s}	+10° 34′ 05.2″	6.28	0.73	420	A1V	
BC CMi			BC	64052	38406	07^{h} 52^{m} 07.16^{s}	+03° 16′ 39.1″	6.30	0.75	420	M5	semiregular variable, V_{max} = 6.14^{m}, V_{min} = 6.42^{m}, P = 35 d
HD 65123				65123	38870	07^{h} 57^{m} 16.39^{s}	+01° 07′ 37.3″	6.35	2.51	191	F6V	
HD 58552				58552	36123	07^{h} 26^{m} 27.81^{s}	+10° 36′ 29.0″	6.38	1.45	316	A2IV	
HD 59603				59603	36553	07^{h} 31^{m} 08.79^{s}	+11° 12′ 10.8″	6.38	−0.32	712	K0	
HD 63838				63838	38306	07^{h} 50^{m} 53.42^{s}	+00° 04′ 46.4″	6.38	0.86	414	K2III	
HD 58599				58599	36141	07^{h} 26^{m} 41.22^{s}	+11° 00′ 31.9″	6.39	−1.55	1264	B7II-III	
HD 62407				62407	37723	07^{h} 44^{m} 14.07^{s}	+12° 51′ 36.4″	6.40	−0.75	876	K0	
HD 63475				63475	38196	07^{h} 49^{m} 32.32^{s}	+12° 48′ 51.5″	6.42	0.44	511	K0	
BU CMi			BU	65241	38945	07^{h} 58^{m} 05.90^{s}	+07° 12′ 48.8″	6.42	−0.64	842	A0V	Algol variable
HD 57707				57707	35751	07^{h} 22^{m} 28.30^{s}	+00° 42′ 03.4″	6.43	2.24	225	G5	
AZ CMi			AZ	62437	37705	07^{h} 44^{m} 07.64^{s}	+02° 24′ 19.6″	6.46	0.84	433	A5IV	δ Sct variable, V_{max} = 6.44^{m}, V_{min} = 6.51^{m}, P = 0.09526 d
HD 63798				63798	38303	07^{h} 50^{m} 51.11^{s}	+04° 27′ 33.8″	6.49	1.12	387	G5	
HD 62286				62286	37634	07^{h} 43^{m} 21.21^{s}	+04° 56′ 44.9″	6.50	0.03	643	K0	
S CMi			S	59950	36675	07^{h} 32^{m} 43.07^{s}	+08° 19′ 05.2″	6.60		2450	M7-8e	Mira variable, V_{max} = 6.6^{m}, V_{min} = 13.2^{m}, P = 332.94 d
HD 64584	θ (Note: Labelled Theta Canis Minoris (θ CMi/θ Canis Minoris) by Bode in his Uranographia)			64584	38669	07^{h} 55^{m} 02.00^{s}	+12° 34′ 10.2″	6.97		1359	K0	
HD 59539	ξ^{2} (Note: Labelled Xi^{2} Canis Minoris (ξ^{2} CMi/ξ^{2} Canis Minoris by Bode in his Uranographia)			59539		07^{h} 30^{m} 25.78^{s}	+03° 18′ 25.2″	7.09		1326	K5III C	
HD 58122	ρ (Note: Labelled Rho Canis Minoris (ρ CMi/ρ Canis Minoris) by Bode in his Uranographia)			58122	35923	07^{h} 24^{m} 18.19^{s}	+03° 10′ 40.7″	7.24		594	K0	
HD 59271	ξ^{1} (Note: Labelled Xi^{1} Canis Minoris (ξ^{1} CMi/ξ^{1} Canis Minoris by Bode in his Uranographia)			59271	36384	07^{h} 29^{m} 17.91^{s}	+03° 22′ 49.2″	7.63		510	A5	
AI CMi			AI			07^{h} 35^{m} 41.15^{s}	+00° 14′ 58.0″	8.31			G5Iab	slow irregular variable, V_{max} = 7.77^{m}, V_{min} = 9.53^{m}
HD 56126			CY	56126		07^{h} 16^{m} 10.6^{s}	+09° 59′ 48.0″	8.32			F5Iab	post-AGB star, ΔV = 0.18^{m}, P = 39 d
YY CMi			YY	67110		08^{h} 06^{m} 38.56^{s}	+01° 55′ 46.5″	8.70			F7V	β Lyr variable, V_{max} = 8.33^{m}, V_{min} = 9.13^{m}, P = 1.0940197 d
AD CMi			AD	64191	38473	07^{h} 52^{m} 47.18^{s}	+01° 35′ 50.5″	9.38		528	F2:III	δ Sct variable, V_{max} = 9.21^{m}, V_{min} = 9.51^{m}, P = 0.12297443 d
Luyten's star					36208	07^{h} 27^{m} 24.91^{s}	+05° 13′ 32.8″	9.87	11.94	12.37	M3.5V	
XZ CMi			XZ			07^{h} 54^{m} 07.06^{s}	+03° 39′ 20.4″	10.25			F0	Algol variable, V_{max} = 9.7^{m}, V_{min} = 10.42^{m}, P = 0.5780095 d
AK CMi			AK			07^{h} 40^{m} 15.60^{s}	+03° 57′ 09.5″	10.73			A-F	Algol variable
YZ CMi			YZ			07^{h} 44^{m} 40.17^{s}	+03° 33′ 08.8″	11.23		19.419	M4.5V	BY Dra and UV Cet variable
HAT-P-50						07^{h} 52^{m} 15.0^{s}	+12° 08′ 22″	11.76		1947		has a transiting planet (b)
BG CMi			BG			07^{h} 31^{m} 29.01^{s}	+09° 56′ 23.1″	14.5				DQ Her variable, V_{max} = 13.9^{m}, V_{min} = 15.6^{m}, P = 0.13475 d
Table legend: • Name = Proper name • B = Bayer designation • F or/and G. = Flamsteed designation or Gould designation • Var = Variable star designation • HD = Henry Draper Catalogue designation number • HIP = Hipparcos Catalogue designation number • RA = Right ascension for the Epoch/Equinox J2000.0 • Dec = Declination for the Epoch/Equinox J2000.0 • vis. mag. = visual magnitude (m or m_{v}), also known as apparent magnitude • abs. mag. = absolute magnitude (M_{v}) • Dist. (ly) = Distance in light-years from Earth • Sp. class = Spectral class of the star in the stellar classification system • Notes = Common name(s) or alternate name(s); comments; notable properties [for example: multiple star status, range of variability if it is a variable star, exoplanets, etc.]

== See also ==
- Lists of stars by constellation
