= Canis Minor in Chinese astronomy =

According to traditional Chinese uranography, the modern constellation Canis Minor is located within the southern quadrant of the sky, which is symbolized as the Vermilion Bird of the South (南方朱雀, Nán Fāng Zhū Què).

The name of the western constellation in modern Chinese is 小犬座 (xiǎo quǎn zuò), meaning "the puppy constellation".

== Stars ==
The map of Chinese constellation in constellation Canis Minor area consists of:

Four Symbols	Mansion (Chinese name)	Romanization	Translation	Asterisms (Chinese name)	Romanization	Translation	Western star name	Proper Name	Chinese star name	Romanization	Translation
Vermilion Bird of the South (南方朱雀)	井	Jǐng	Well	南河	Nánhé	South River					
Vermilion Bird of the South (南方朱雀)	井	Jǐng	Well	南河	Nánhé	South River	ε CMi		南河一	Nánhéyī	1st star
Vermilion Bird of the South (南方朱雀)	井	Jǐng	Well	南河	Nánhé	South River	β CMi	Gomeisa			
Vermilion Bird of the South (南方朱雀)	井	Jǐng	Well	南河	Nánhé	South River	β CMi	Gomeisa	南河二	Nánhéèr	2nd star
Vermilion Bird of the South (南方朱雀)	井	Jǐng	Well	南河	Nánhé	South River	β CMi	Gomeisa	南河中星	Nánhézhōngxīng	Center star
Vermilion Bird of the South (南方朱雀)	井	Jǐng	Well	南河	Nánhé	South River	β CMi	Gomeisa	诸王西星	Zhūwángxīxīng	Star of kings in the west
Vermilion Bird of the South (南方朱雀)	井	Jǐng	Well	南河	Nánhé	South River	β CMi	Gomeisa	河戍	Héshù	Guardian (star) of the river
Vermilion Bird of the South (南方朱雀)	井	Jǐng	Well	南河	Nánhé	South River	α CMi	Procyon			
Vermilion Bird of the South (南方朱雀)	井	Jǐng	Well	南河	Nánhé	South River	α CMi	Procyon	南河三	Nánhésān	3rd star
Vermilion Bird of the South (南方朱雀)	井	Jǐng	Well	南河	Nánhé	South River	α CMi	Procyon	南河大星	Nánhédàxīng	Big star
Vermilion Bird of the South (南方朱雀)	井	Jǐng	Well	南河	Nánhé	South River	α CMi	Procyon	河戍	Héshù	Guardian (star) of the river
Vermilion Bird of the South (南方朱雀)	井	Jǐng	Well	南河	Nánhé	South River	γ CMi		南河增一	Nánhézēngyī	1st additional star
Vermilion Bird of the South (南方朱雀)	井	Jǐng	Well	南河	Nánhé	South River	η CMi		南河增二	Nánhézēngèr	2nd additional star
Vermilion Bird of the South (南方朱雀)	井	Jǐng	Well	南河	Nánhé	South River	δ^{3} CMi		南河增三	Nánhézēngsān	3rd additional star
Vermilion Bird of the South (南方朱雀)	井	Jǐng	Well	南河	Nánhé	South River	δ^{2} CMi		南河增四	Nánhézēngsì	4th additional star
Vermilion Bird of the South (南方朱雀)	井	Jǐng	Well	南河	Nánhé	South River	δ^{1} CMi		南河增五	Nánhézēngwǔ	5th additional star
Vermilion Bird of the South (南方朱雀)	井	Jǐng	Well	南河	Nánhé	South River	ζ CMi		南河增六	Nánhézēngliù	6th additional star
Vermilion Bird of the South (南方朱雀)	井	Jǐng	Well	南河	Nánhé	South River	14 CMi		南河增七	Nánhézēngqī	7th additional star
Vermilion Bird of the South (南方朱雀)	井	Jǐng	Well	南河	Nánhé	South River	HD 66141		南河增八	Nánhézēngbā	8th additional star
Vermilion Bird of the South (南方朱雀)	井	Jǐng	Well	南河	Nánhé	South River	HD 61563		南河增十一	Nánhézēngshíyī	11th additional star
Vermilion Bird of the South (南方朱雀)	井	Jǐng	Well	水位	Shuǐwèi	Water Level					
Vermilion Bird of the South (南方朱雀)	井	Jǐng	Well	水位	Shuǐwèi	Water Level	6 CMi		水位一	Shuǐwèiyī	1st star
Vermilion Bird of the South (南方朱雀)	井	Jǐng	Well	水位	Shuǐwèi	Water Level	11 CMi		水位二	Shuǐwèièr	2nd star
Vermilion Bird of the South (南方朱雀)	井	Jǐng	Well	水位	Shuǐwèi	Water Level	1 CMi		水位增九	Shuǐwèizēngyī	1st additional star

== See also ==
- Chinese astronomy
- Traditional Chinese star names
- Chinese constellations
