= Delta Canis Minoris =

The Bayer designation Delta Canis Minoris (δ CMi / δ Canis Minoris) is shared by three stars in the constellation Canis Minor:

- δ^{1} Canis Minoris
- δ^{2} Canis Minoris
- δ^{3} Canis Minoris
