= NGC 2491 =

Galaxy in the constellation Canis Minor

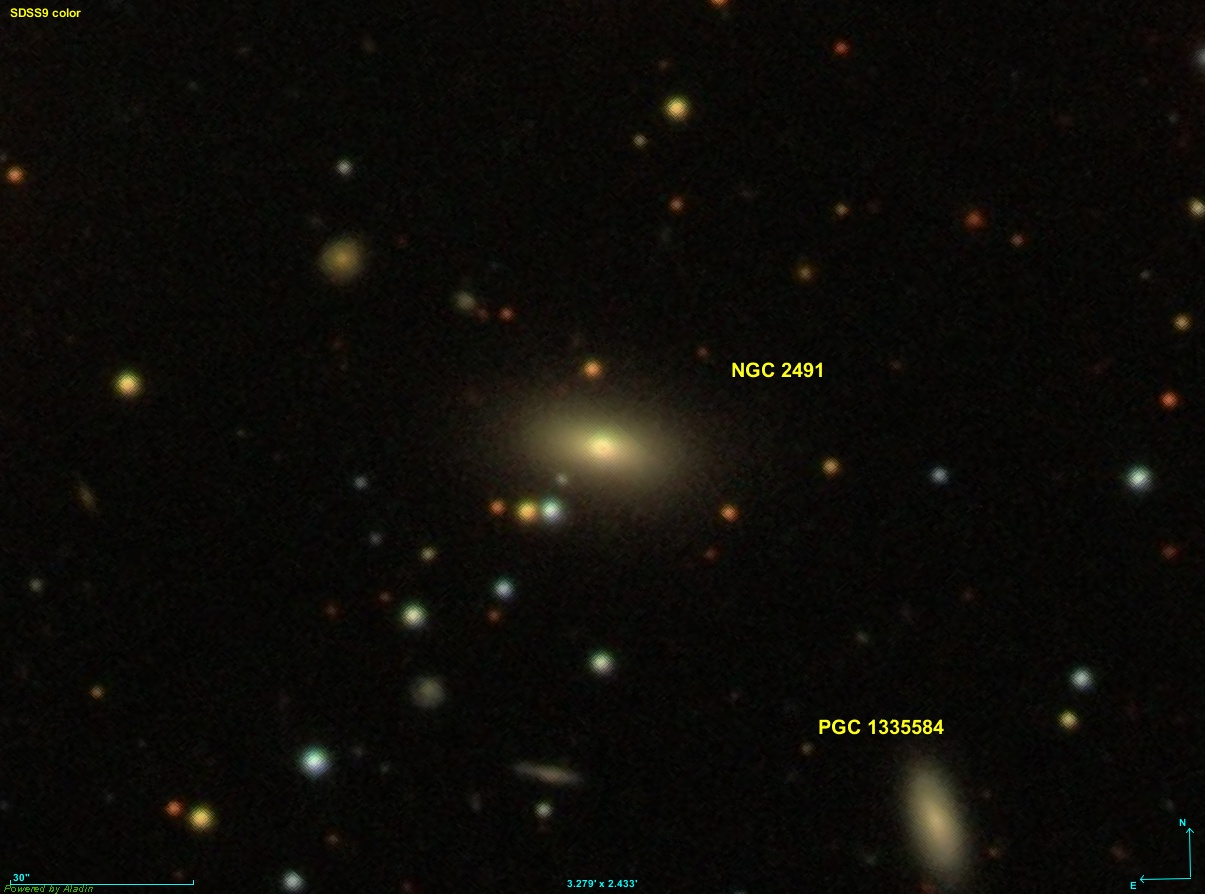
- Sloan Digital Sky Survey of NGC 2491

Observation data (J2000 epoch)
- Constellation: Canis Minor
- Right ascension: 07h 58m 27.37s
- Declination: +07d 59m 01.74s
- Redshift: 0.039290
- Heliocentric radial velocity: 18,476 km/s
- Distance: 583 Mly (178.74 Mpc)
- Apparent magnitude (V): 14.8
- Apparent magnitude (B): 15.6
- Surface brightness: 11.75

Characteristics
- Type: S
- Size: 130,000 ly
- Apparent size (V): 0.3' x 0.2'

Other designations
- PGC 22353, 2MASX J07582739+0759018, SDSS J075827.37+075901.7, CGCG 031-007, 2MASS J07582738+0759019, NPM1G+08.0123, LEDA 22353

NGC 2491 is a spiral galaxy located in the constellation Canis Minor. It is located 580 million light-years from Earth and has an approximate diameter of 130,000 light-years.

== Details ==
NGC 2491 was discovered by American astronomer Lewis Swift on November 15, 1885. Swift described it as extremely faint, small, with a round irregular shape, and a bright star to the west. With a surface brightness of magnitude of 11.75, NGC 2491 is classified as a high surface brightness galaxy.
