= NGC 2485 =

Galaxy in the constellation Canis Minor

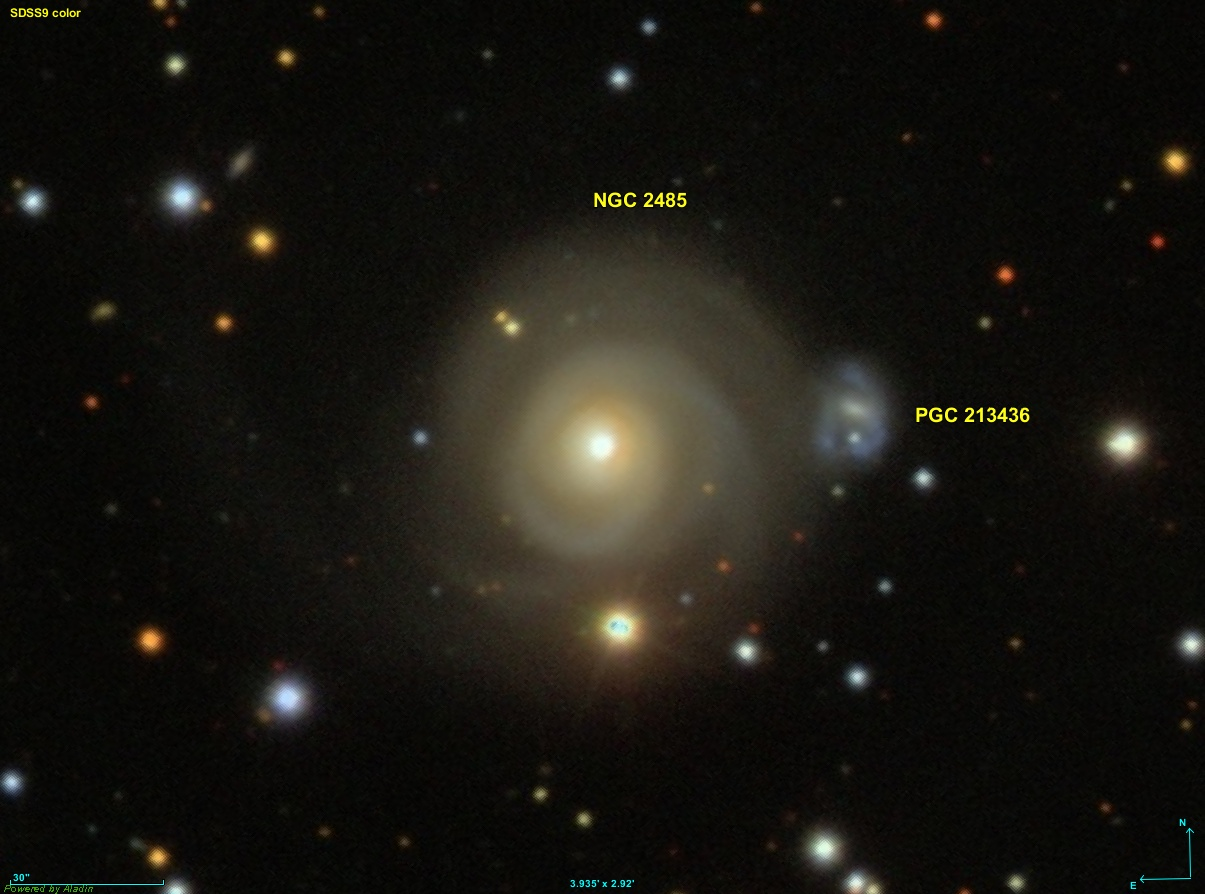
- NGC 2485 taken by Sloan Digital Sky Survey

Observation data (J2000 epoch)
- Constellation: Canis Minor
- Right ascension: 07h 56m 48.66s
- Declination: +07d 28m 40.62s
- Redshift: 0.015391
- Heliocentric radial velocity: 4,630 km/s
- Distance: 233 Mly (71.43 Mpc)
- Apparent magnitude (V): 12.2
- Apparent magnitude (B): 13.1
- Surface brightness: 13.08

Characteristics
- Type: Sa
- Size: 110,000 ly
- Apparent size (V): 1.6' x 1.6'

Other designations
- PGC 22266, UGC 4112, IRAS 07541+0736, MCG+01-21-001, NSA 134732, SDSS J075648.66+072840.6, UZC J075648.7+0728400, LEDA 22266

NGC 2485 is a spiral galaxy located in the constellation of Canis Minor. It is located 233 million light-years away from Earth and has an estimated diameter of 110,000 light-years. NGC 2485 was discovered on March 25, 1864, by Albert Marth and has an approximate surface magnitude of 13.08.
