= Zeta Cancri =

Star system in the constellation Cancer

ζ Cancri A/B/C
- Location of ζ Cancri (circled)

Observation data Epoch J2000 Equinox ICRS
- Constellation: Cancer
- Right ascension: 08^{h} 12^{m} 12.726^{s}
- Declination: +17° 38′ 51.96″
- Apparent magnitude (V): +5.58/+5.99/+6.12

Characteristics
- Evolutionary stage: main-sequence star
- Spectral type: F8V + G0V + G0IV-V

Astrometry
Proper motion (μ)	RA: 27.61 mas/yr Dec.: −151.73 mas/yr
Parallax (π)	39.87±0.82 mas
Distance	82 ± 2 ly (25.1 ± 0.5 pc)

Orbit
Primary	Zeta^{1} Cancri
Name	Zeta^{2} Cancri
Period (P)	1,115 yr
Semi-major axis (a)	7.7″
Eccentricity (e)	0.24
Inclination (i)	146°
Longitude of the node (Ω)	74.2°

Details

Zeta Cancri A
Mass	1.28 M_{☉}
Temperature	6,230 K

Zeta Cancri B
Mass	1.18 M_{☉}
Temperature	6,230 K

Zeta Cancri Ca
Mass	1.15 M_{☉}
Radius	1.27±0.06 R_{☉}
Surface gravity (log g)	4.27±0.10 cgs
Temperature	6,008±80 K
Metallicity [Fe/H]	+0.10 dex
Rotational velocity (v sin i)	1.5±1.0 km/s

Zeta Cancri Cb1
Mass	0.50 M_{☉}
Temperature	3,700 K
Metallicity [Fe/H]	+0.10 dex

Zeta Cancri Cb2
Mass	0.50 M_{☉}
Temperature	3,700 K
Metallicity [Fe/H]	+0.10 dex

Other designations
- ζ Cancri, 16 Cancri, BD+18°1867, GJ 9257, HIP 40167, ADS 6650, CCDM J08123+1738
- Zeta^{1} Cancri A: Tegmen, Tegmine, ζ^{1} Cnc A, GC 11141 (A), HD 68257, HR 3208, SAO 97645 (A), WDS J08122+1739A
- Zeta^{1} Cancri B: ζ^{1} Cnc B, GC 11141 (B), HD 68255, HR 3209, SAO 97645 (B), WDS J08122+1739B
- Zeta^{2} Cancri: ζ^{2} Cnc, GC 11142, HD 68256, HR 3210, SAO 97646, WDS J08122+1739C

Database references
SIMBAD	data

Zeta Cancri is a multiple star system in the constellation of Cancer. Its name is a Bayer designation that is Latinized from ζ Cancri, and abbreviated Zeta Cnc or ζ Cnc. This group is located approximately 82 light-years from Earth, and has a combined apparent magnitude of +4.67. Since it is near the ecliptic, it can be occulted by the Moon.

The system is constituted as follows:

- A binary pair designated Zeta^{1} Cancri or, alternatively, Zeta Cancri AB, the two components of which are themselves designated Zeta^{1} Cancri A or, simply, Zeta Cancri A (formally also named Tegmine /ˈtɛɡmɪniː/, the traditional name of the Zeta Cancri system) and Zeta^{1}/Zeta Cancri B.
- A triple star system designated Zeta^{2} Cancri or alternatively Zeta Cancri C, consisting of a single star primary, designated Zeta^{2}/Zeta Cancri Ca, together with a secondary binary pair, designated Zeta^{2}/Zeta Cancri Cb. The binary pair's two components are themselves designated Zeta^{2}/Zeta Cancri Cb1 and Cb2.

== Nomenclature ==
ζ Cancri (Latinised to Zeta Cancri) is the system's Bayer designation; ζ^{1} Cancri and ζ^{2} Cancri those of its two constituents. The designations of the two constituents as ζ Cancri AB and C, and those of their components—ζ Cancri A, B, Ca, Cb, Cb1 and Cb2—derive from the convention used by the Washington Multiplicity Catalog (WMC) for multiple star systems, and adopted by the International Astronomical Union (IAU).

Considerable confusion had developed concerning the catalogue identities of the three bright stars; correct correspondences were worked out by R. F. Griffin:

Component	HR	HD	SAO	HIP
ζ Cancri A	3208	68257	97645	40167
ζ Cancri B	3209	68255	97645	40167
ζ Cancri C	3210	68256	97646	40167

Zeta Cancri bore the traditional name Tegmine (Tegmen) "the shell (of the crab)". In 2016, the International Astronomical Union organized a Working Group on Star Names (WGSN) to catalogue and standardize proper names for stars. The WGSN decided to attribute proper names to individual stars rather than entire multiple systems. It approved the name Tegmine for the component Zeta^{1} Cancri A on 12 September 2016 and it is now so included in the List of IAU-approved Star Names.

In Chinese, 水位 (Shuǐ Wèi), meaning Water Level, refers to an asterism consisting of Zeta Cancri, 6 Canis Minoris, 11 Canis Minoris and 8 Cancri. Consequently, Zeta Cancri itself is known as 水位四 (Shuǐ Wèi sì, English: the Fourth Star of Water Level).

== Properties ==
Zeta Cancri can be resolved as a binary star in small telescopes. Its binary nature was discovered in 1756 by Tobias Mayer. William Herschel resolved the two components that make up Zeta^{1} Cancri in 1781. As early as 1831, John Herschel noticed perturbations in Zeta^{2} Cancri's orbit around Zeta^{1}; this led Otto Wilhelm von Struve, in 1871, to postulate a fourth, unseen, component which orbited closely the visible member of Zeta^{2}. Later observations have resolved this fourth component and have indicated that there may be one or two more unobserved components.

Zeta^{1} and Zeta^{2} Cancri are 5.06 arcseconds apart. These two star systems orbit around their common centre of mass once every 1,115 years.

=== Zeta^{1} Cancri ===
The two components are both yellow-white main-sequence dwarfs of spectral class F. The apparent magnitudes of A and B are +5.58 and +5.99, respectively. They are separated, as of 2008, by 1 arcsecond, requiring a large telescope to resolve them, but this separation will increase until the year 2020. They complete one orbit every 59.6 years. The estimated masses for the pair are 1.28 and 1.18 solar masses, respectively.

=== Zeta^{2} Cancri ===
Zeta Cancri Ca is the brightest of the three components, having an apparent magnitude of +6.12. It appears to be a yellow G-type star, often reported as G5V, but now thought to be earlier, probably G0V. This star has around 1.15 solar masses and 1.27 solar radii. The tenth magnitude Zeta Cancri Cb is a close pair of red dwarfs. The separation between Ca and Cb is approximately 0.3 arcsecond, and their orbital period is 17 years.
