= HD 60803 =

Star in the constellation Canis Minor

Observation data Epoch J2000 Equinox ICRS
- Constellation: Canis Minor
- Right ascension: 07^{h} 36^{m} 34.70576^{s}
- Declination: 05° 51′ 43.8228″
- Apparent magnitude (V): 5.904

Characteristics
- Spectral type: G0V + G1V
- U−B color index: 1.351

Astrometry
Radial velocity (R_{v})	+4.60±0.06 km/s
Proper motion (μ)	RA: −109.760 mas/yr Dec.: +27.392 mas/yr
Parallax (π)	24.1025±0.0542 mas
Distance	135.3 ± 0.3 ly (41.49 ± 0.09 pc)
Absolute magnitude (M_{V})	2.93

Orbit
Period (P)	26.1889±0.0006 d
Semi-major axis (a)	≥16.61±0.04 Gm
Eccentricity (e)	0.2187±0.0017
Periastron epoch (T)	49644.88±0.03 MJD
Argument of periastron (ω) (secondary)	113.6±0.5°
Semi-amplitude (K_{1}) (primary)	47.26±0.10 km/s
Semi-amplitude (K_{2}) (secondary)	48.16±0.12 km/s

Details

A
Mass	1.18±0.08 M_{☉}
Radius	1.64±0.23 R_{☉}
Luminosity	6.416±0.020 L_{☉}
Surface gravity (log g)	4.08±0.12 cgs
Temperature	6,055±70 K
Metallicity [Fe/H]	−0.04±0.02 dex
Rotational velocity (v sin i)	2.6±0.6 km/s
Age	5.5±0.5 Gyr

B
Mass	1.15±0.06 M_{☉}
Radius	1.51±0.16 R_{☉}
Surface gravity (log g)	4.14±0.09 cgs
Temperature	6069±70 K
Rotational velocity (v sin i)	0.9±1.0 km/s

Other designations
- BD+06°1729, HD 60803, HIP 37031, HR 2918, SAO 115693

Database references
SIMBAD	data

HD 60803 is a binary star system in the equatorial constellation of Canis Minor, located less than a degree to the northwest of the prominent star Procyon. It has a yellow hue and is visible to the naked eye as a dim point of light with a combined apparent visual magnitude of 5.904. The distance to this system is 135 light years as determined using parallax measurements, and is drifting further away with a radial velocity of +4.6 km/s.

The binary nature of this star system was first noted by O. C. Wilson and A. Skumanich in 1964. It is a double-lined spectroscopic binary with an orbital period of 26.2 days and an eccentricity of 0.22. Both components are similar, G-type main-sequence stars; the primary has a stellar classification of G0V while the secondary has a class of G1V. The masses are similar to each other, and are 28–31% greater than the mass of the Sun. They have low rotation rates which may be quasi-synchronized with their orbital period.
