= BU Canis Minoris =

Star in the constellation Canis Minor

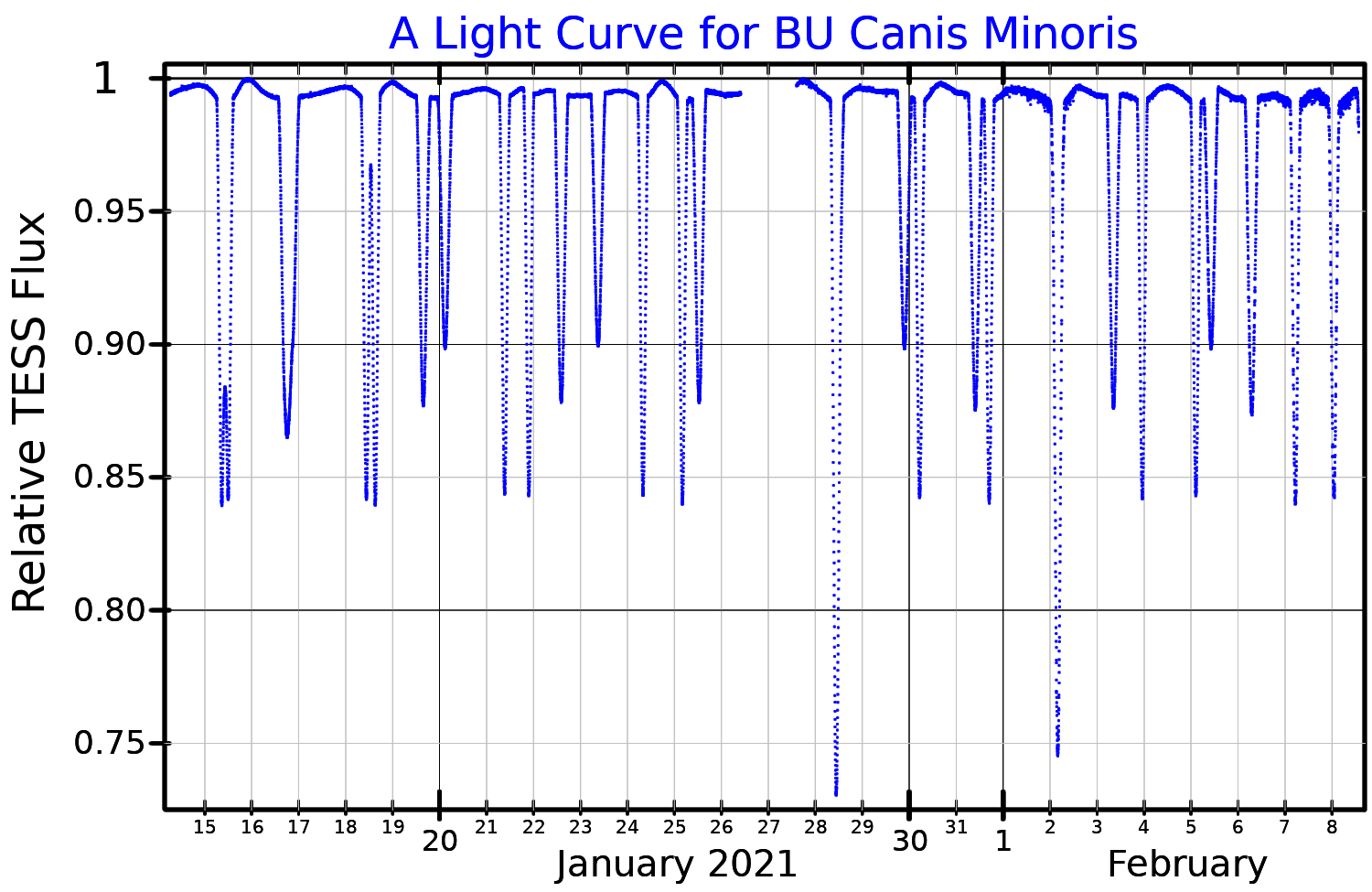
- A light curve for BU Canis Minoris, plotted from TESS data

Observation data Epoch J2000 Equinox ICRS
- Constellation: Canis Minor
- Right ascension: 07^{h} 58^{m} 05.89734^{s}
- Declination: +07° 12′ 48.7030″
- Apparent magnitude (V): 6.42

Characteristics
- Spectral type: A0V
- B−V color index: −0.031±0.008

Astrometry
Radial velocity (R_{v})	+34.0±6.5 km/s
Proper motion (μ)	RA: −9.407 mas/yr Dec.: −11.835 mas/yr
Parallax (π)	4.0663±0.0568 mas
Distance	800 ± 10 ly (246 ± 3 pc)
Absolute magnitude (M_{V})	−0.38

Orbit
Primary	A
Name	B
Period (P)	6.54 yr
Semi-major axis (a)	16.1 R_{☉}
Eccentricity (e)	0.71

Orbit
Primary	Aa
Name	Ab
Period (P)	2.94 days
Semi-major axis (a)	16.1 R_{☉}
Eccentricity (e)	0.20
Inclination (i)	83.89°

Orbit
Primary	Ba
Name	Bb
Period (P)	3.26 days
Semi-major axis (a)	17.3 R_{☉}
Eccentricity (e)	0.22
Inclination (i)	83.40°

Details

BU CMi Aa
Mass	3.40±0.10 M_{☉}
Radius	2.51±0.05 R_{☉}
Surface gravity (log g)	4.088±0.010 cgs
Temperature	10,130±80 K

BU CMi Ab
Mass	3.11±0.10 M_{☉}
Radius	1.80±0.05 R_{☉}
Surface gravity (log g)	4.338±0.010 cgs
Temperature	9,740±80 K

BU CMi Ba
Mass	3.29±0.10 M_{☉}
Radius	2.31±0.05 R_{☉}
Surface gravity (log g)	4.148±0.010 cgs
Temperature	10,180±80 K

BU CMi Bb
Mass	3.29±0.10 M_{☉}
Radius	2.04±0.05 R_{☉}
Surface gravity (log g)	4.259±0.010 cgs
Temperature	9,890±80 K

Other designations
- BU CMi, BD+07°1879, HD 65241, HIP 38945, HR 3103, SAO 116179

Database references
SIMBAD	data

BU Canis Minoris is a quadruple star system in the equatorial constellation of Canis Minor. It has the Henry Draper Catalogue designation of HD 65241, while BU Canis Minoris is its variable star designation. The system is a challenge to view with the naked eye, having a peak apparent visual magnitude of 6.42. It is located at a distance of approximately 700 light years from the Sun based on parallax, and is drifting further away with a radial velocity of about +34 km/s.

BU Canis Majoris was discovered to be a variable star when the Hipparcos data was analyzed. It was given its variable star designation in 1999.

In 2021, BU Canis Majoris was found to be composed to two eclipsing binaries, totalling four stars. Both pairs are double-lined spectroscopic binary systems that form Algol-like eclipsing binaries. The orbits of both systems are somewhat eccentric. The brightness of the system decreases from 6.44 down to 6.53 during the primary eclipse. It has a stellar classification of A0V, which matches an A-type main-sequence star that is generating energy through hydrogen fusion at its core. In reality, however, all four stars are nearly equal in properties, and have masses from 3.1 to 3.4 solar masses. The system is about 200 million years old.
