= Canis Minorids =

Meteor shower

The Canis Minorids, also called the Beta Canis Minorids, are a meteor shower that arises near the fifth-magnitude star 11 Canis Minoris. They were discovered in 1964 by Keith Hindley, who investigated their trajectory and proposed a common origin with the comet C/1917 F1 (Mellish). However, this conclusion has been disputed, as the number of orbits analysed was low and their trajectories too disparate to confirm a link. They last from 4 to 15 December, peaking over 10 and 11 December.
