= BC Canis Minoris =

Star in the constellation Canis Minor

- Location of BC Canis Minoris (circled in red)

Observation data Epoch J2000 Equinox J2000
- Constellation: Canis Minor
- Right ascension: 07^{h} 52^{m} 07.18978^{s}
- Declination: +03° 16′ 38.4369″
- Apparent magnitude (V): 6.30 (6.14 to 6.42)

Characteristics
- Evolutionary stage: AGB
- Spectral type: M4/5III
- B−V color index: 1.464±0.015
- Variable type: SRb

Astrometry
Radial velocity (R_{v})	−66.91±0.24 km/s
Proper motion (μ)	RA: +49.643 mas/yr Dec.: −78.206 mas/yr
Parallax (π)	5.7446±0.0689 mas
Distance	568 ± 7 ly (174 ± 2 pc)
Absolute magnitude (M_{V})	0.36

Details
Mass	2.2 M_{☉}
Radius	83 ± 7 (Note: Calculated, using the Stefan-Boltzmann law and the star's effective temperature and luminosity, with respect to the solar nominal effective temperature of 5,772 K: $$\sqrt{\biggl(\frac{5,772}{3,400}\biggr)^4 \cdot 2,300} = 138\ R_\odot.$$) R_{☉}
Luminosity	820±90 L_{☉}
Surface gravity (log g)	1.82 cgs
Temperature	3,400±100 K
Metallicity [Fe/H]	−0.38 dex
Age	2.5 Gyr

Other designations
- BC CMi, BD+03°1824, HD 64052, HIP 38406, HR 3061, SAO 116054

Database references
SIMBAD	data

BC Canis Minoris is a variable star in the equatorial constellation of Canis Minor. It has a reddish hue and is just barely visible to the naked eye with an apparent visual magnitude that fluctuates around 6.30. The distance to this object is approximately 568 light years based on parallax, but it is drifting closer with a radial velocity of −67 km/s.

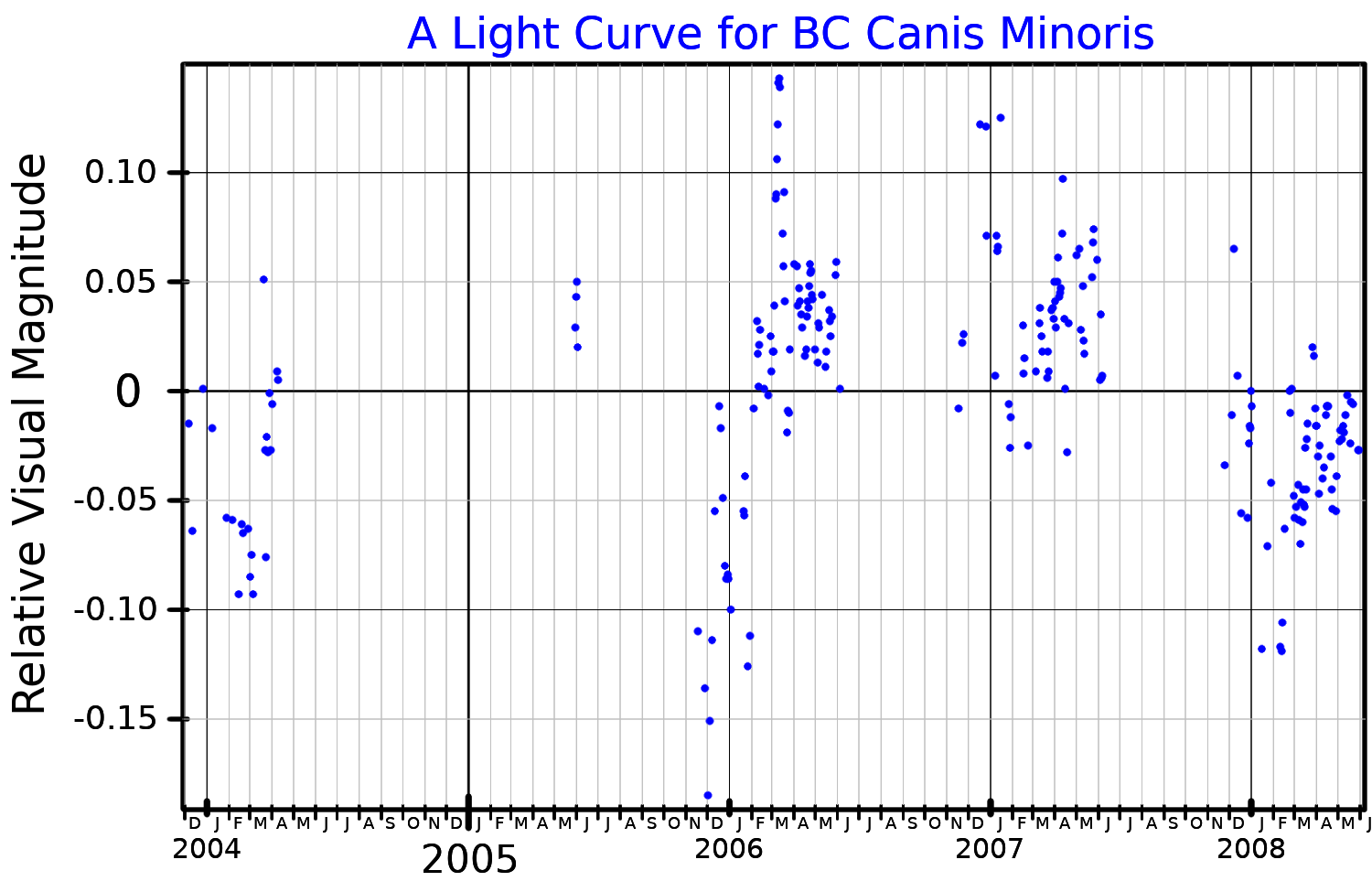
A visual band light curve for BC Canis Minoris, plotted from data presented by Tabur et al. (2009)

In 1962, Alan William James Cousins announced that HR 3061 is a variable star. It was given its variable star designation, BC Canis Minoris, in 1975. It is an aging red giant star currently on the asymptotic giant branch with a stellar classification of M4/5III. It is a semi-regular variable of subtype SRb with measured pulsation periods of 27.7, 143.3 and 208.3 days, and an average visual magnitude of 6.30. With the supply of hydrogen at its core exhausted, it has cooled and expanded off the main sequence and now has around 83 ± 7 times the girth of the Sun. On average, the star is radiating about 820 times the luminosity of the Sunfrom its swollen photosphere at an effective temperature of 3,400 K.
