= YZ Canis Minoris =

Star in the constellation Canis Minor

- Location of YZ Canis Minoris in the constellation Canis Minor

Observation data Epoch J2000 Equinox ICRS
- Constellation: Canis Minor
- Right ascension: 07^{h} 44^{m} 40.17230^{s}
- Declination: +03° 33′ 08.8752″
- Apparent magnitude (V): 11.15

Characteristics
- Spectral type: M5 V
- B−V color index: 1.61

Astrometry
Radial velocity (R_{v})	+25.72±0.20 km/s
Proper motion (μ)	RA: −347.782 mas/yr Dec.: −445.702 mas/yr
Parallax (π)	166.9769±0.0343 mas
Distance	19.533 ± 0.004 ly (5.989 ± 0.001 pc)
Absolute magnitude (M_{V})	12.32

Details
Mass	0.36±0.02 M_{☉}
Radius	0.37±0.01 R_{☉}
Luminosity	1.116×10^{−2} L_{☉}
Surface gravity (log g)	5.0 cgs
Temperature	3,125±61 K
Metallicity [Fe/H]	−0.26±0.08 dex
Rotation	2.8 days
Rotational velocity (v sin i)	4.0 km/s
Age	49 Myr

Other designations
- YZ CMi, GJ 285, HIP 37766, G 50-4, G 112-46, LFT 547, LHS 1943, LSPM J0744+0333, LTT 12064, NLTT 18373, PLX 1827, PM 07421+0341, Ross 882, TYC 183-2190-1, GSC 00183-02190, IRAS 07420+0340, 2MASS J07444018+0333089

Database references
SIMBAD	data

YZ Canis Minoris is a red-hued star in the equatorial constellation of Canis Minor. With an apparent visual magnitude of 11.15, it is much too faint to be viewed with the naked eye. The distance to YZ CMi can be estimated from its annual parallax shift of 167 mas, yielding a value of 19.5 light-years (5.97 parsecs). Presently the star is moving further away with a heliocentric radial velocity of +25.7 km/s. It made its closest approach some 162,000 years ago when it made perihelion passage at a distance of 10.2 ly. YZ CMi is a potential member of the Beta Pictoris moving group.

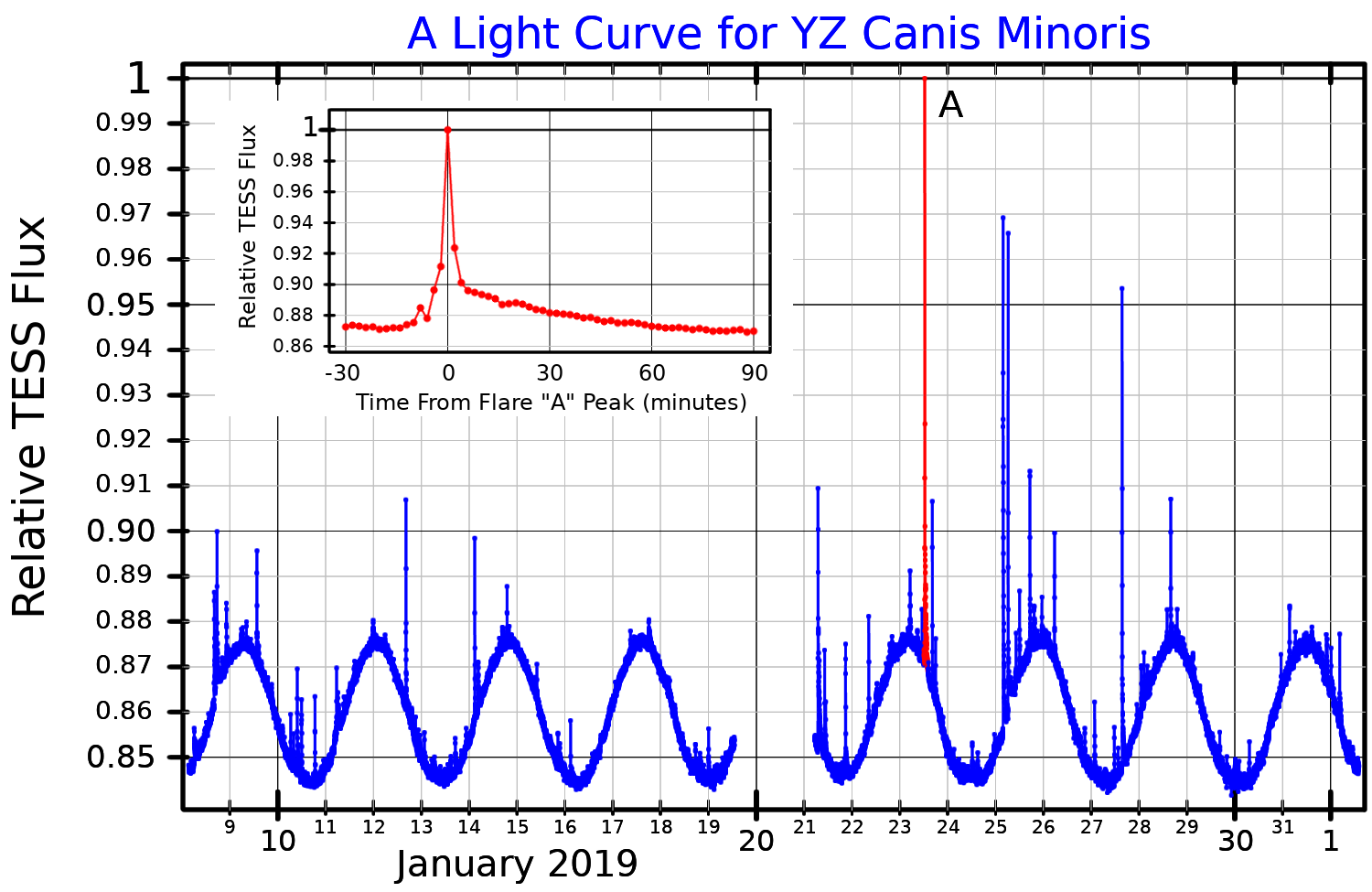
A light curve for YZ Canis Minoris from TESS data, adapted from Maehara et al.(2021). The main plot shows both the periodic brightness variation and several flares. The inset plot shows the strongest flare with an expanded time scale.

This is a red dwarf star, or M-type main-sequence star, with a stellar classification of M5 V. It is a flare star, so called due to its stellar flares being more powerful than those of Earth's star, and is roughly three times the size of jupiter. A "megaflare" was observed on 16 January 2009, lasting for more than 7 hours. This was one of the most energetic flares observed on an isolated low-mass star. The radio emission from the star is in a 50 mHz bandwidth and is centered on 1464.9 mHz. The X-ray surface flux is 2.73×10^{6} erg s^{−1} cm^{−2}. It has a coronal temperature of 5.79 MK.
