= AZ Canis Minoris =

A-type subgiant star in the constellation Canis Minor

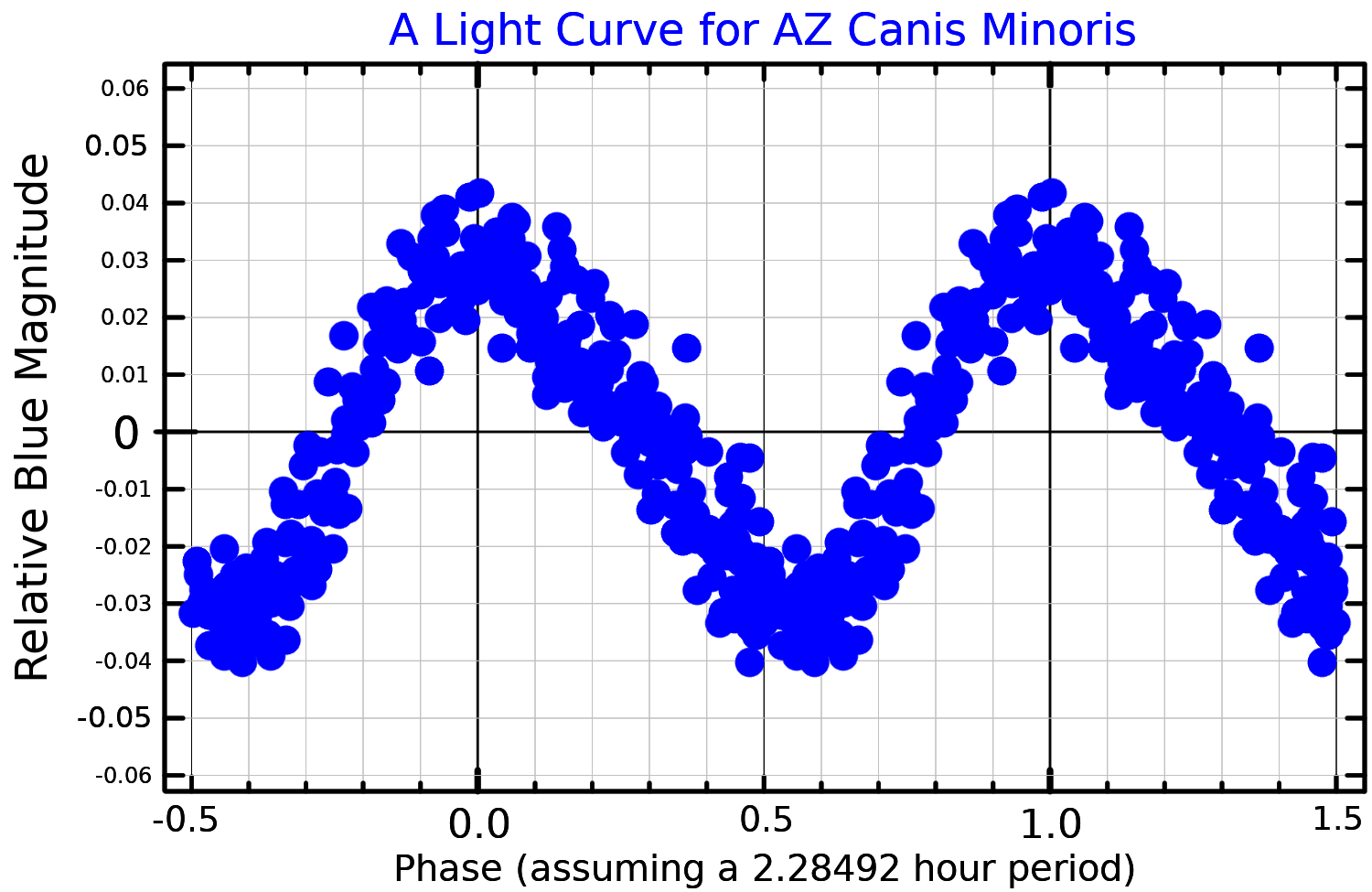
- A blue band light curve for AZ Canis Minoris, adapted from Poretti et al. (1996)

Observation data Epoch J2000.0 Equinox J2000.0 (ICRS)
- Constellation: Canis Minor
- Right ascension: 07^{h} 44^{m} 07.63299^{s}
- Declination: +02° 24′ 19.5217″
- Apparent magnitude (V): 6.44 to 6.51

Characteristics
- Evolutionary stage: main sequence
- Spectral type: A5 IV
- B−V color index: 0.211±0.008
- Variable type: δ Sct

Astrometry
Radial velocity (R_{v})	+14.9±0.9 km/s
Proper motion (μ)	RA: −19.009 mas/yr Dec.: −8.603 mas/yr
Parallax (π)	6.7150±0.0559 mas
Distance	486 ± 4 ly (149 ± 1 pc)
Absolute magnitude (M_{V})	1.01

Details
Mass	1.91 M_{☉}
Radius	3.83+0.20 −0.17 R_{☉}
Luminosity	48.4±1.0 L_{☉}
Surface gravity (log g)	3.6 cgs
Temperature	7,783+138 −201 K
Metallicity [Fe/H]	0.12 dex
Rotational velocity (v sin i)	44 km/s
Age	990 Myr

Other designations
- AZ CMi, BD+02°1761, GC 10410, HD 62437, HIP 37705, HR 2989, SAO 115864

Database references
SIMBAD	data

AZ Canis Minoris is a variable star in the equatorial constellation of Canis Minor. It is just visible to the naked eye in good viewing conditions as a dim, white-hued star with an apparent visual magnitude of around 6.5. The star is located around 500 light years away from the Sun based on parallax, and is drifting further away with a radial velocity of +15 km/s. No evidence has been found for a companion to this star, although in the past it has been reported as a binary star system.

This star has a stellar classification of A5 IV, matching an A-type subgiant star. The variable nature of this star was discovered in 1970 at Kitt Peak Observatory. It is a monoperiodic Delta Scuti variable with a cycle period of 2.29 hours and an amplitude of 0.060 in visual magnitude; ranging from a peak magnitude of 6.44 down to 6.51. AZ Canis Minoris is nearly a billion years old with a projected rotational velocity of 44 km/s. It has 1.9 times the mass of the Sun and 3.8 times the Sun's radius. The star is radiating 48 times as much luminosity as the Sun from its photosphere at an effective temperature of 7,783 K.
