= S Canis Minoris =

Variable star in the constellation Canis Minor

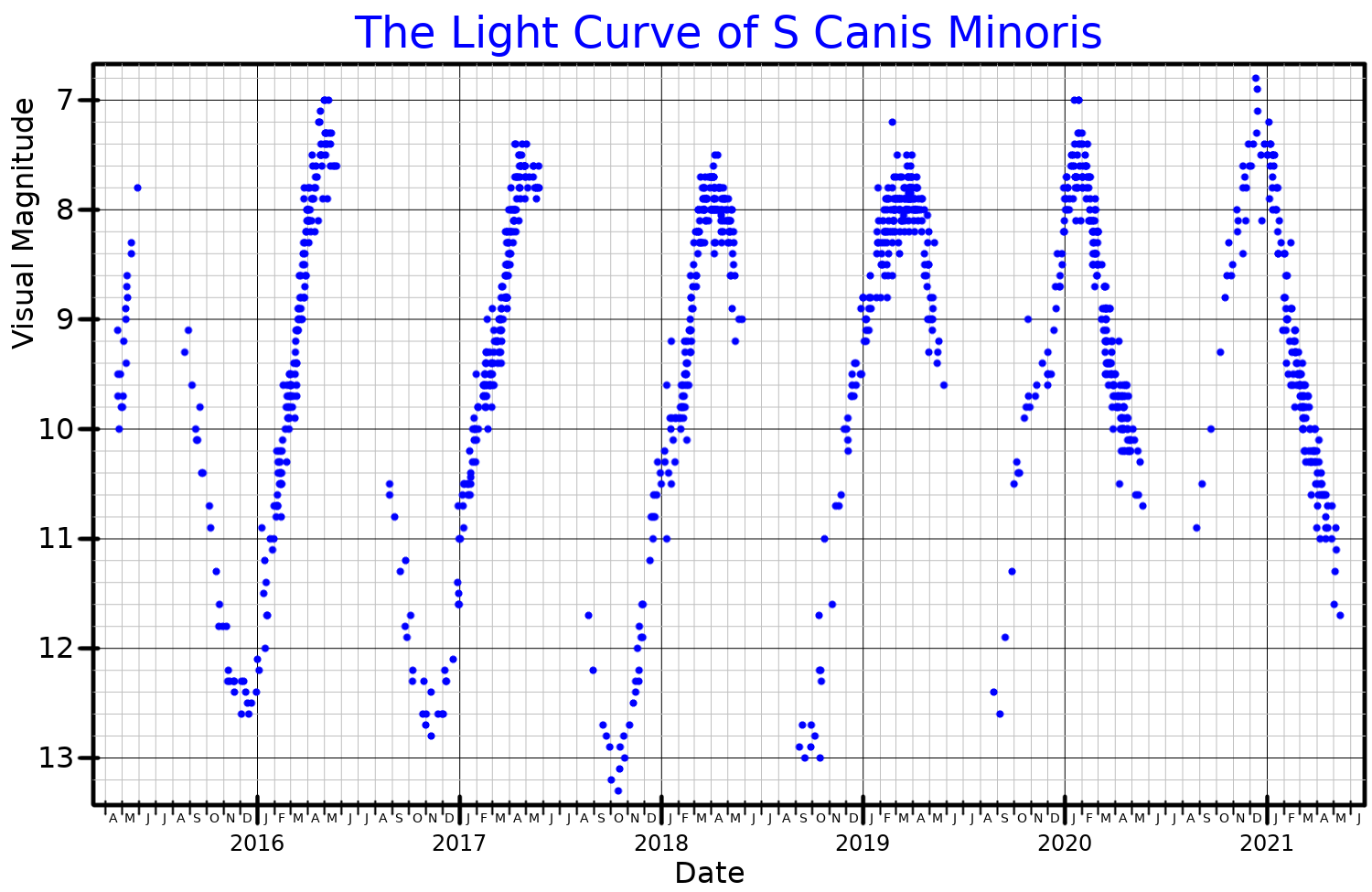
- The visual band light curve of S Canis Minoris, from AAVSO data

Observation data Epoch J2000 Equinox J2000
- Constellation: Canis Minor
- Right ascension: 07^{h} 32^{m} 43.06942^{s}
- Declination: +08° 19′ 05.1975″
- Apparent magnitude (V): 6.5 to 13.7

Characteristics
- Evolutionary stage: AGB
- Spectral type: M7-8e
- B−V color index: 1.50±0.51
- Variable type: Mira variable

Astrometry
Radial velocity (R_{v})	68.0±4.8 km/s
Proper motion (μ)	RA: −10.785 mas/yr Dec.: −12.827 mas/yr
Parallax (π)	2.440±0.098 mas
Distance	1,340 ± 50 ly (410 ± 20 pc)

Details
Radius	378 – 402 R_{☉}
Luminosity	6,174+402 −378 L_{☉}
Surface gravity (log g)	−0.46 to −0.51 cgs
Temperature	2,854 – 2,872 K
Metallicity [Fe/H]	+0.39 dex

Other designations
- S CMi, AAVSO 0727+08, BD+08°1800, HD 59950, HIP 36675, SAO 115591

Database references
SIMBAD	data

S Canis Minoris is a variable star in the equatorial constellation Canis Minor. It has a peak apparent visual magnitude of 6.5, so not normally visible to the naked eye. The star is located at a distance of approximately 1,340 light-years from the Sun based on stellar parallax, and is drifting further away with a radial velocity of about +68 km/s.

In 1856, John Russell Hind discovered that S Canis Minoris is a variable star. This is an aging red giant star with a stellar classification of M7-8e, where the 'e' suffix indicates emission lines in the spectrum. It is a Mira-type long period variable that varies by an amplitude of 4.27 in visual magnitude over a period of 327.77±2.78 d. Evidence has been found of asymmetry in this star, suggesting a non-spherical shape. Abundance-wise, it is an oxygen-rich giant and the emission feature is of the oxygen-rich silicate class as it sheds silicate dust from its atmosphere. The star is shedding mass at the rate of 4.9×10^{−8} M_{☉}/yr.
