= HD 66141 =

Star in the constellation Canis Minor

- Location of HD 66141 (circled)

Observation data Epoch J2000.0 Equinox ICRS
- Constellation: Canis Minor
- Right ascension: 08^{h} 02^{m} 15.93692^{s}
- Declination: +02° 20′ 04.4588″
- Apparent magnitude (V): +4.39

Characteristics
- Spectral type: K2IIIbFe-0.5:
- B−V color index: 1.252±0.008

Astrometry
Radial velocity (R_{v})	+71.57±0.01 km/s
Proper motion (μ)	RA: −28.194 mas/yr Dec.: 105.65 mas/yr
Parallax (π)	12.5234±0.1142 mas
Distance	260 ± 2 ly (79.9 ± 0.7 pc)
Absolute magnitude (M_{V})	−0.07

Details
Mass	0.98±0.06 M_{☉}
Radius	23.57±0.40 R_{☉}
Luminosity	209±9 L_{☉}
Habitable zone inner limit	13.45±0.41 AU
Habitable zone outer limit	26.38±0.77 AU
Surface gravity (log g)	2.09±0.06 cgs
Temperature	4,521±53 K
Metallicity [Fe/H]	−0.52±0.05 dex
Rotational velocity (v sin i)	1.91±0.45 km/s
Age	9.18±2.09 Gyr

Other designations
- G Canis Minoris, G CMi, 13 Puppis (obsolete), NSV 17713, BD+02°1854, FK5 2623, GC 10891, HD 66141, HIP 39311, HR 3145, SAO 116260, CCDM 08022+0221, WDS J08023+0220A

Database references
SIMBAD	data
Exoplanet Archive	data

HD 66141 is a single star with a substellar companion in the equatorial constellation of Canis Minor. It has the Bayer designation G Canis Minoris, the Gould designation 50 G. Canis Minoris, and has the HR 3145 identifier from the Bright Star Catalogue. When first catalogued it was in the constellation Puppis and was designated "13 Puppis", but it subsequently migrated to Canis Minor. Bode gave it the Bayer designation of Lambda Canis Minoris.

== Properties ==
This star has an orange hue and is bright enough to be faintly visible to the naked eye on a dark night, having an apparent visual magnitude of +4.39. It is located at a distance of approximately 260 light years from the Sun based on parallax, and is drifting further away with a radial velocity of +71.6 km/s. The star is considered a member of the thin disk population. It has one known substellar companion, previously believed to be a planet, but now thought to be a likely brown dwarf, with some caveats.

The stellar classification of HD 66141 is K2IIIbFe-0.5:, which indicates an evolved K-type giant star with a mild underabundance of iron. It is an estimated nine billion years old with 0.98 times the mass of the Sun and has expanded to 23.5 times the Sun's radius. Over 2003 to 2012 a starspot was periodically dimming its light. The star is radiating 209 times the luminosity of the Sun from its photosphere at an effective temperature of 4,521 K.

A magnitude 10.32 visual companion was reported by J. Glaisher in 1842. As of 2015, it was located at an angular separation of 224.90 arcseconds along a position angle of 315°.

== Planetary system ==
From December 2003 to January 2012, the team B.-C. Lee, I. Han, and M.-G. Park observed HD 66141 with "the fiber-fed Bohyunsan Observatory Echelle Spectrograph (BOES) at Bohyunsan Optical Astronomy Observatory (BOAO)".

In 2012, a long-period, wide-orbiting exoplanet was deduced by radial velocity. This was published in November.

However, in 2024, a study using astrometry from the Gaia spacecraft suggest that HD 66141 b is actually a brown dwarf, with a maximum mass estimated at 23.9+7.2
−6.4 M_{J}, based on a large RUWE in the astrometric solution (which could imply that there is a brown dwarf orbiting HD 66141), but they also note that mechanisms such as calibration errors could also explain the large RUWE. A bayesian analysis combining astrometry and radial velocity also measure an orbital inclination of 17 degrees and an orbital period of 480.7 days (1.316 years).

The HD 66141 planetary system
Companion (in order from star)	Mass	Semimajor axis (AU)	Orbital period (days)	Eccentricity	Inclination (°)	Radius
b	≤23.9+7.2 −6.4 M_{J}	1.2 ± 0.1	480.7±0.1	0.07 ± 0.03	17+3 −4	—
