= Procyon =

Star in the constellation Canis Minor

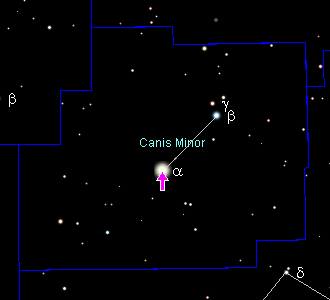
- The position of Procyon

Observation data Epoch J2000 Equinox ICRS
- Constellation: Canis Minor
- Pronunciation: /ˈproʊsi.ɒn/ PROH-see-on
- Right ascension: 07^{h} 39^{m} 18.11950^{s}
- Declination: +05° 13′ 29.9552″
- Apparent magnitude (V): 0.34 (A) / 10.7 (B)

Characteristics
- Evolutionary stage: Subgiant + White dwarf
- Spectral type: F5 IV–V + DQZ
- U−B color index: +0.00
- B−V color index: +0.42
- Variable type: suspected (A)

Astrometry
Radial velocity (R_{v})	−3.2 km/s
Proper motion (μ)	RA: −714.590 mas/yr Dec.: −1036.80 mas/yr
Parallax (π)	284.56±1.26 mas
Distance	11.46 ± 0.05 ly (3.51 ± 0.02 pc)
Absolute magnitude (M_{V})	2.66/13.0

Orbit
Secondary	Procyon B
Period (P)	40.840 ± 0.022 yr
Semi-major axis (a)	4.3075 ± 0.0016" (15.137 AU (Note: Semi-major axis in AU = $\frac{semimajor\ axis\ in\ seconds}{parallax}\ {{=}}\ \frac{4.3075}{0.28456}$ = 15.137 AU; as the eccentricity is 0.398, the distance fluctuates between 48% and 152% of that, roughly from 9 AU to 21 AU.))
Eccentricity (e)	0.39785 ± 0.00025
Inclination (i)	31.408 ± 0.050°
Longitude of the node (Ω)	100.683 ± 0.095°
Periastron epoch (T)	1968.076 ± 0.023
Argument of periastron (ω) (secondary)	89.23 ± 0.11°

Details

Procyon A
Mass	1.478±0.012 M_{☉}
Radius	2.043±0.009 R_{☉}
Luminosity	7.049±0.064 L_{☉}
Habitable zone inner limit	2.391 AU
Habitable zone outer limit	4.152 AU
Surface gravity (log g)	3.98±0.02 cgs
Temperature	6,582±5 K
Metallicity [Fe/H]	−0.02±0.02 dex
Rotation	23 days
Rotational velocity (v sin i)	3.16±0.50 km/s
Age	1.87±0.13 Gyr

Procyon B
Mass	0.592±0.006 M_{☉}
Radius	0.01234±0.00032 R_{☉}
Luminosity	0.00049 L_{☉}
Surface gravity (log g)	8.0 cgs
Temperature	7,740±50 K
Age	1.37 Gyr

Other designations
- Elgomaisa, α Canis Minoris, 10 Canis Minoris, BD+05°1739, GJ 280, HD 61421, HIP 37279, HR 2943, SAO 115756, LHS 233

Database references
SIMBAD	The system
- A
- B

Procyon (/ˈproʊsi.ɒn/) is the brightest star in the constellation of Canis Minor and usually the eighth-brightest star in the night sky, with an apparent visual magnitude of 0.34. It has the Bayer designation α Canis Minoris, which is Latinized to Alpha Canis Minoris, and abbreviated α CMi or Alpha CMi, respectively. As determined by the European Space Agency Hipparcos astrometry satellite, this system lies at a distance of just 11.46 light-years (3.51 parsecs), and is therefore one of Earth's nearest stellar neighbors. A binary star system, Procyon consists of a white-hued main-sequence star of spectral type F5 IV–V, designated component A, in orbit with a faint white dwarf companion of spectral type DQZ, named Procyon B. The pair orbit each other with a period of 40.84 years and an eccentricity of 0.4.

== Observation ==
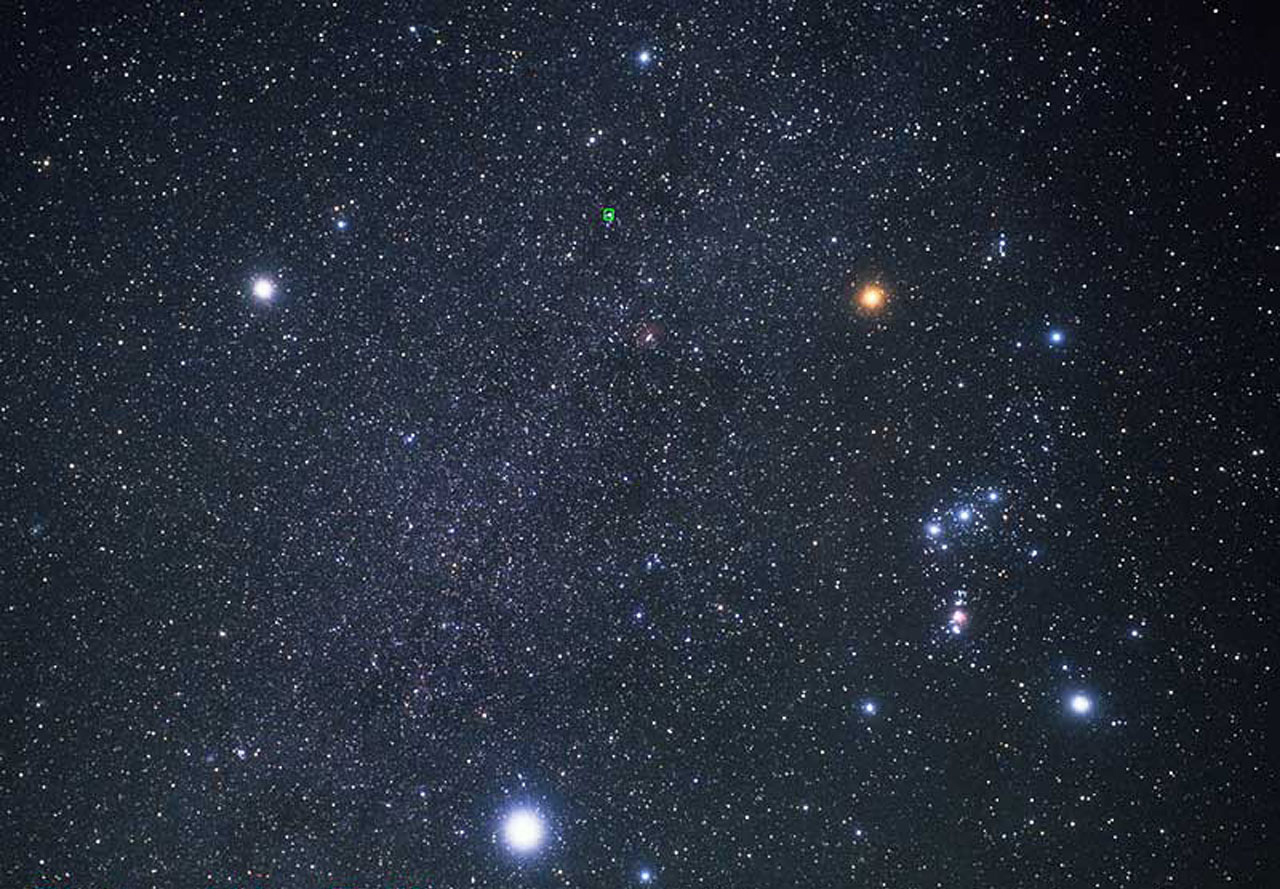
Procyon (top left), Betelgeuse (top right) and Sirius (bottom) form the Winter Triangle. Orion is to the right. Viewed from Northern Hemisphere

Procyon is usually the eighth-brightest star in the night sky, culminating at midnight on 14 January. It forms one of the three vertices of the Winter Triangle asterism, in combination with Sirius and Betelgeuse. Procyon is also one of the six stars that form the Winter Hexagon asterism. The prime period for evening viewing of Procyon is in late winter in the Northern Hemisphere.

It has a color index of 0.42, and its hue has been described as having a faint yellow tinge to it.

Procyon's proper motion is large enough that its position relative to the other bright stars of Canis Minor shifts noticeably over tens of thousands of years.

== Stellar system ==
Procyon is a binary star system with a bright primary component, Procyon A, having an apparent magnitude of 0.34, and a faint companion, Procyon B, at magnitude 10.7. The pair orbit each other with a period of 40.84 years along an elliptical orbit with an eccentricity of 0.4, more eccentric than Mercury's. The plane of their orbit is inclined at an angle of 31.1° to the line of sight with the Earth. The average separation of the two components is 15.0 AU, a little less than the distance between Uranus and the Sun, though the eccentric orbit carries them as close as 8.9 AU and as far as 21.0 AU.

=== Procyon A ===
The primary has a stellar classification of F5IV–V, indicating that it is a late-stage F-type main-sequence star. Procyon A is bright for its spectral class, suggesting that it is evolving into a subgiant that has nearly fused its hydrogen core into helium, after which it will expand as the nuclear reactions move outside the core. As it continues to expand, the star will eventually swell to about 80 to 150 times its current diameter and become a red or orange color. This will probably happen within 10 to 100 million years.

The effective temperature of the stellar atmosphere is an estimated 6,582 K, giving Procyon A a white hue. It is 1.5 times the solar mass (M_{☉}), twice the solar radius (R_{☉}), and has seven times the Sun's luminosity (L_{☉}). Both the core and the envelope of this star are convective; the two regions being separated by a wide radiation zone.

==== Oscillations ====
In late June 2004, Canada's orbital MOST satellite telescope carried out a 32-day survey of Procyon A. The continuous optical monitoring was intended to confirm solar-like oscillations in its brightness observed from Earth and to permit asteroseismology. No oscillations were detected and the authors concluded that the theory of stellar oscillations may need to be reconsidered. However, others argued that the non-detection was consistent with published ground-based radial velocity observations of solar-like oscillations. Subsequent observations in radial velocity have confirmed that Procyon is indeed oscillating.

Photometric measurements from the NASA Wide Field Infrared Explorer (WIRE) satellite from 1999 and 2000 showed evidence of granulation (convection near the surface of the star) and solar-like oscillations. Unlike the MOST result, the variation seen in the WIRE photometry was in agreement with radial velocity measurements from the ground. Additional observations with MOST taken in 2007 were able to detect oscillations.

=== Procyon B ===
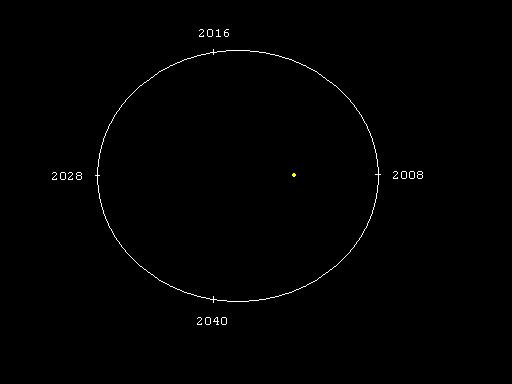
Orbit of Procyon B seen from above its plane

Like Sirius B, Procyon B is a white dwarf that was inferred from astrometric data long before it was observed. Its existence had been postulated by German astronomer Friedrich Bessel as early as 1844, and, although its orbital elements had been calculated by his countryman Arthur Auwers in 1862 as part of his thesis, Procyon B was not visually confirmed until 1896 when John Martin Schaeberle observed it at the predicted position using the 36-inch refractor at Lick Observatory. It is more difficult to observe from Earth than Sirius B, due to a greater apparent magnitude difference and smaller angular separation from its primary.

At 0.6 M_{☉}, Procyon B is considerably less massive than Sirius B; however, the peculiarities of degenerate matter ensure that it is larger than its more famous neighbor, with an estimated radius of 8,600 km, versus 5,800 km for Sirius B. The radius agrees with white dwarf models that assume a carbon core. It has a stellar classification of DQZ, having a helium-dominated atmosphere with traces of heavy elements. For reasons that remain unclear, the mass of Procyon B is unusually low for a white dwarf star of its type. With a surface temperature of 7,740 K, it is also much cooler than Sirius B due to its lesser mass and greater age. The mass of the progenitor star for Procyon B was about 2.59+0.22
−0.18 M_{☉} and it came to the end of its life some 1.19±0.11 billion years ago, after a main-sequence lifetime of 680±170 million years.

=== X-ray emission ===
Attempts to detect X-ray emission from Procyon with nonimaging, soft X-ray-sensitive detectors prior to 1975 failed. Extensive observations of Procyon were carried out with the Copernicus and TD-1A satellites in the late 1970s. The X-ray source associated with Procyon AB was observed on 1 April 1979, with the Einstein Observatory high-resolution imager (HRI). The HRI X-ray pointlike source location is ~4″ south of Procyon A, on the edge of the 90% confidence error circle, indicating identification with Procyon A rather than Procyon B which was located about 5″ north of Procyon A (about 9″ from the X-ray source location).

== Etymology and cultural significance ==
α Canis Minoris (Latinized to Alpha Canis Minoris) is the star's Bayer designation.

The name Procyon comes from the Ancient Greek Προκύων (Prokyon), meaning "before the dog", since it precedes the "Dog Star" Sirius as it travels across the sky due to Earth's rotation. (Although Procyon has a greater right ascension, it also has a more northerly declination, which means it will rise above the horizon earlier than Sirius from most northerly latitudes.) In Greek mythology, Procyon is associated with Maera, a hound belonging to Erigone, daughter of Icarius of Athens. In 2016, the International Astronomical Union organized a Working Group on Star Names (WGSN) to catalog and standardize proper names for stars. The WGSN's first bulletin of July 2016 included a table of the first two batches of names approved by the WGSN; which included Procyon for the star α Canis Minoris A.

The two dog stars are referred to in the most ancient literature and were venerated by the Babylonians and the Egyptians, In Babylonian mythology, Procyon was known as Nangar (the Carpenter), an aspect of Marduk, involved in constructing and organizing the celestial sky.

The constellations in Macedonian folklore represented agricultural items and animals, reflecting their village way of life. To them, Procyon and Sirius were Volci "the wolves", circling hungrily around Orion which depicted a plough with oxen.

Rarer names are the Latin translation of Procyon, Antecanis, and the Arabic-derived names Al Shira and Elgomaisa. Medieval astrolabes of England and Western Europe used a variant of this, Algomeiza/Algomeyza. Al Shira derives from الشعرى الشامية aš-ši‘ra aš-šamiyah, "the Syrian sign" (the other sign being Sirius; "Syria" is supposedly a reference to its northern location relative to Sirius); Elgomaisa derives from الغميصاء al-ghumaisa’ "the bleary-eyed (woman)", in contrast to العبور "the teary-eyed (woman)", which is Sirius. (See Gomeisa.)

In Chinese, 南河 (Nán Hé), meaning South River, refers to an asterism consisting of Procyon, ε Canis Minoris and β Canis Minoris. Consequently, Procyon itself is known as 南河三 (Nán Hé sān, the Third Star of South River). It is part of the Vermilion Bird.

The Hawaiians see Procyon as part of an asterism Ke ka o Makali'i ("the canoe bailer of Makali'i") that helps them navigate at sea. It forms this asterism with Capella, Sirius, Castor and Pollux, all forming the bailer around the Pleiades (Makali’i). In Hawaiian language, this star is called Puana ("blossom"), which is a new Hawaiian name based on the Māori name Puangahori. In Tahitian lore, Procyon was one of the pillars propping up the sky, known as Anâ-tahu'a-vahine-o-toa-te-manava ("star-the-priestess-of-brave-heart"), the pillar for elocution. Māori astronomers know the star as Puangahori ("False Puanga") which distinguishes it from its pair Puanga or Puanga-rua ("Blossom-cluster") which refers to a star of great importance to Māori culture and calendar, known by its western name Rigel.

Procyon appears on the flag of Brazil, symbolizing the state of Amazonas. The Kalapalo people of Mato Grosso state in Brazil call Procyon and Canopus Kofongo ("Duck"), with Castor and Pollux representing his hands. The asterism's appearance signified the coming of the rainy season and increase in food staple manioc, used at feasts to feed guests.

Known as Sikuliarsiujuittuq to the Inuit, Procyon was quite significant in their astronomy and mythology. Its eponymous name means "the one who never goes onto the newly formed sea ice", and refers to a man who stole food from his village's hunters because he was too obese to hunt on ice. He was killed by the other hunters who convinced him to go on the sea ice. Procyon received this designation because it typically appears red (though sometimes slightly greenish) as it rises during the Arctic winter; this red color was associated with Sikuliarsiujuittuq's bloody end.

== View from this system ==
Were the Sun to be observed from this star system, it would appear to be a magnitude 2.55 star in the constellation Aquila with the exact opposite coordinates at right ascension 19^{h} 39^{m} 18.11950^{s}, declination −05° 13′ 29.9552″. It would be as bright as β Scorpii is in Earth's sky.

Procyon's closest neighboring star is Luyten's Star, about 1.12 light-years (0.34 parsecs) away. Procyon would be the brightest star in the night sky of an exoplanet orbiting Luyten's Star, with an apparent magnitude of −4.68. (Note: The absolute magnitude M_{v} of Procyon is 2.66, so the apparent magnitude m is given by $2.66\ -\ 5 + 5log_{10}(0.34) {{=}} -4.68$.) Luyten's Star would also be visible from Procyon, at an apparent magnitude of 4.61, unlike any red dwarfs from Earth with a possible exception of Lacaille 8760.

== See also ==
- Procyon in astrology

== Sources ==
- Schaaf, Fred (2008). The Brightest Stars: Discovering the Universe through the Sky's Most Brilliant Stars. Hoboken, New Jersey: John Wiley & Sons. ISBN 978-0-471-70410-2.
