= Zeta Canis Minoris =

Star in the constellation Canis Minor

ζ Canis Minoris
- Location of ζ Canis Minoris (circled)

Observation data Epoch J2000.0 Equinox J2000.0 (ICRS)
- Constellation: Canis Minor
- Right ascension: 07^{h} 51^{m} 41.989^{s}
- Declination: +01° 46′ 00.73″
- Apparent magnitude (V): 5.13

Characteristics
- Spectral type: B8 II
- U−B color index: −0.46
- B−V color index: −0.13

Astrometry
Radial velocity (R_{v})	+32.3±2.8 km/s
Proper motion (μ)	RA: −13.704 mas/yr Dec.: −4.043 mas/yr
Parallax (π)	4.0023±0.09 mas
Distance	810 ± 20 ly (250 ± 6 pc)
Absolute magnitude (M_{V})	−1.32

Details
Mass	4.7±0.1 M_{☉}
Radius	6.7±0.2 R_{☉}
Luminosity	931^{+38}_{−36} L_{☉}
Surface gravity (log g)	3.36 cgs
Temperature	12,311^{+15}_{−7} K
Rotational velocity (v sin i)	28.0 km/s

Other designations
- ζ CMi, 13 CMi, BD+02°1808, GC 6, HD 63975, HIP 38373, HR 3059, SAO 116043

Database references
SIMBAD	data

Zeta Canis Minoris is a solitary, blue-white hued star in the equatorial constellation of Canis Minor. Its name is a Bayer designation that is Latinized from ζ Canis Minoris and abbreviated Zeta CMi or ζ CMi. This is a dim star but visible to the naked eye with an apparent visual magnitude of 5.13. Based on an annual parallax shift of 5.23 mas as seen from Earth, this star is located around 410 light years away. It is moving further from the Sun with a radial velocity of +32.3 km/s.

The spectrum of this star presents as a B-type bright giant with a stellar classification of B8 II. It is a Mercury-Manganese star, showing an overabundance of these elements in its spectrum. The mean longitudinal magnetic field strength is 8.28±11.55 G. The star has about 4.7 times the mass of the Sun and 6.7 times the Sun's radius. It is radiating 931 times the Sun's luminosity from its photosphere at an effective temperature of 12,311 K.
