= Eta Canis Minoris =

Binary star system in the constellation Canis Minor

η Canis Minoris
- Location of η Canis Minoris (circled)

Observation data Epoch J2000.0 Equinox ICRS
- Constellation: Canis Minor
- A
- Right ascension: 07^{h} 28^{m} 02.075^{s}
- Declination: +06° 56′ 31.09″
- Apparent magnitude (V): 11.1
- B
- Right ascension: 07^{h} 28^{m} 02.210^{s}
- Declination: +06° 56′ 34.88″
- Apparent magnitude (V): 11.1

Characteristics
- Spectral type: F0 III
- U−B color index: +0.17
- B−V color index: +0.22

Astrometry

A
Radial velocity (R_{v})	+17.2 km/s
Proper motion (μ)	RA: −3.109 mas/yr Dec.: −43.633 mas/yr
Parallax (π)	10.2172±0.1069 mas
Distance	319 ± 3 ly (98 ± 1 pc)
Absolute magnitude (M_{V})	0.1

B
Proper motion (μ)	RA: −1.915 mas/yr Dec.: −44.581 mas/yr
Parallax (π)	10.2562±0.0271 mas
Distance	318.0 ± 0.8 ly (97.5 ± 0.3 pc)

Details

η CMi A
Mass	2.16 M_{☉}
Radius	3.6 (Note: derived from known mass and surface gravity of star) R_{☉}
Luminosity	57.5 L_{☉}
Surface gravity (log g)	3.66 cgs
Temperature	7,505±66 K
Rotational velocity (v sin i)	54 km/s
Age	818 Myr

Other designations
- η CMi, 5 CMi, BD+07°1729, GC 9970, HD 58923, HIP 36265, HR 2851, SAO 115477, ADS 6101, CCDM 07280+0657, WDS J07280+0657A

Database references
SIMBAD	data
- B

Eta Canis Minoris is a binary star system in the equatorial constellation of Canis Minor. Its name is a Bayer designation that is Latinized from η Canis Minoris, and abbreviated Eta CMi or η CMi. The brighter component has an apparent visual magnitude of 5.25, which indicates it is faintly visible to the naked eye. Based on parallax measurements, the distance to this system is approximately 318 light-years (97 pc) from the Sun. It is drifting further away with a line of sight velocity of +17 km/s.

The primary component, η Canis Minoris A, is a yellow-white F-type giant with a stellar classification of F0 III. At the estimated age of 818 million years, it shows a high rate of spin with a projected rotational velocity of 54 km/s. The star has 2.2 times the mass of the Sun mass and is radiating 57.5 times the Sun's luminosity from its photosphere at an effective temperature of 7,505 K.

The companion star was first reported by S. W. Burnham in 1872. Designated η Canis Minoris B, it is an eleventh-magnitude star located at an angular separation of 4 arcseconds from the primary. At the distance of this system, this is equivalent to a physical separation of around 440 AU from the main star, taking around 5,000 years to orbit it.
