= Gamma Canis Minoris =

Binary star system in the constellation Canis Minor

γ Canis Minoris
- Location of γ Canis Minoris (circled)

Observation data Epoch J2000.0 Equinox J2000.0 (ICRS)
- Constellation: Canis Minor
- Right ascension: 07^{h} 28^{m} 09.794^{s}
- Declination: +08° 55′ 31.89″
- Apparent magnitude (V): +4.33 (4.46 + 6.66)

Characteristics
- Spectral type: K3 III Fe-0.5 (K4 III + K1: III)
- U−B color index: +1.53
- B−V color index: +1.43

Astrometry
Radial velocity (R_{v})	46.8±0.3 km/s
Proper motion (μ)	RA: −62.112 mas/yr Dec.: −11.141 mas/yr
Parallax (π)	3.134±0.1714 mas
Distance	1,040 ± 60 ly (320 ± 20 pc)
Absolute magnitude (M_{V})	−0.5±0.1
Absolute magnitude (M_{V})	1.7±0.2

Orbit
Period (P)	389.310±0.012d
Semi-major axis (a)	17 mas
Eccentricity (e)	0.25856±0.00039
Inclination (i)	66°
Periastron epoch (T)	2449849.172±0.089 HJD
Argument of periastron (ω) (secondary)	142.079±0.090°
Semi-amplitude (K_{1}) (primary)	21.243±0.010 km/s
Semi-amplitude (K_{2}) (secondary)	21.526±0.017 km/s

Details

γ CMi A
Mass	1.88 M_{☉}
Radius	36.8±2.6 R_{☉}
Luminosity	321±33 L_{☉}
Temperature	4,036±100 K
Rotational velocity (v sin i)	5±2 km/s
Age	1.3 Gyr

γ CMi B
Mass	1.85 M_{☉}
Radius	7.8±1.0 R_{☉}
Luminosity	25.4±5.2 L_{☉}
Temperature	4,658±200 K
Rotational velocity (v sin i)	2.0±2.0 km/s

Other designations
- γ CMi, 4 CMi, BD+09°1660, GC 9974, HD 58972, HIP 36284, HR 2854, SAO 115478, ADS 6100, CCDM 07281+0856, WDS J07282+0856A

Database references
SIMBAD	data

Gamma Canis Minoris is a binary star system in the equatorial constellation Canis Minor. Its name is a Bayer designation that is Latinized from γ Canis Minoris, and abbreviated Gamma CMi or γ CMi. The orange colour is obvious when seen through binoculars. The system is visible to the naked eye with a combined apparent visual magnitude of +4.33. Based upon an annual parallax shift of 3.13 mas as seen from Earth, this system is located at a distance of approximately 1,040 light-years (320 pc) from the Sun. It is drifting further away with a line of sight velocity of 47 km/s.

This spectroscopic binary star system has an orbital period of 389.31 days, a semimajor axis of 1.48 AU, and an eccentricity of 0.2586. Their variable radial velocity was discovered by H. M. Reese in 1902 at Lick Observatory. Both components are evolved, K-type giant stars, most likely on their first ascent along the red giant branch. The primary, component A, has a stellar classification of K4 III while the secondary, component B, may be K1: III.
