= Delta2 Canis Minoris =

Star in the constellation Canis Minor

δ^{2} Canis Minoris
- Location of δ^{2} Canis Minoris (circled)

Observation data Epoch J2000 Equinox ICRS
- Constellation: Canis Minor
- Right ascension: 07^{h} 33^{m} 11.666^{s}
- Declination: +03° 17′ 25.37″
- Apparent magnitude (V): 5.571

Characteristics
- Evolutionary stage: main sequence
- Spectral type: F2 V
- U−B color index: +0.10
- B−V color index: +0.31

Astrometry
Radial velocity (R_{v})	+3.40±0.24 km/s
Proper motion (μ)	RA: –15.909 mas/yr Dec.: 42.696 mas/yr
Parallax (π)	23.1488±0.0622 mas
Distance	140.9 ± 0.4 ly (43.2 ± 0.1 pc)
Absolute magnitude (M_{V})	3.01

Details
Mass	1.63 M_{☉}
Radius	1.855 R_{☉}
Luminosity	10 L_{☉}
Surface gravity (log g)	4.15 cgs
Temperature	7,378±251 K
Rotational velocity (v sin i)	113 km/s
Age	874 Myr

Other designations
- δ^{2} Canis Minoris, 8 Canis Minoris, BD+03°1715, GC 10104, HD 60111, HIP 36723, HR 2887, SAO 115610

Database references
SIMBAD	data

Delta^{2} Canis Minoris is a single star in the constellation Canis Minor. Its name is a Bayer designation that is Latinized from δ^{2} Canis Minoris, and abbreviated Delta^{2} CMi or δ^{2} CMi. An apparent visual magnitude of 5.57 means it is deemed visible to the naked eye but faint and requires a dark sky to view. Based on parallax measurements it is calculated to be 141 light-years (43 pc) distant from the Earth. It is drifting further away from the Sun with a line of sight velocity of +3 km/s.

The star figures from this part of the Milky Way galaxy as the more central of three that share the Delta designation (the greek-lettered catalog is that of Johann Bayer's 1603 Uranometria atlas of bright stars) in star atlases very close, southwest of Delta^{3} Canis Minoris which is physically unrelated. The Flamsteed designation for this star is 8 Canis Minoris in John Flamsteed's 1712 star catalog.

== Properties ==
This star is rotating rapidly; the projected rotational velocity is 117.6 km/s, which means that the equator of this star is rotating at this velocity or greater. By comparison, the Sun is a slow rotator with an equatorial azimuthal velocity of 2 km/s. δ^{2} Canis Minoris has a stellar classification of F2 V, indicating that this is an F-type main-sequence star that is generating energy at its core through thermonuclear fusion of hydrogen. The effective temperature of the photosphere is about 7053 K, giving it the yellow-white hue that is characteristic of F-type stars. The radius of this star can be estimated indirectly based upon the measured brightness and color information, which suggests the star is about 86% larger than the Sun.

As of 2008, no companion has been suspected or found orbiting δ^{2} Canis Minoris.
