= Canis Minor =

Constellation in the northern celestial hemisphere

- Constellation
- List of stars in Canis Minor
- Abbreviation: CMi
- Genitive: Canis Minoris
- Pronunciation: /ˌkeɪnɪs ˈmaɪnər/ KAY-niss MY-nər, genitive /ˌkeɪnɪs mɪˈnɔːrɪs/ KAY-niss min-OR-iss
- Symbolism: The Lesser Dog
- Right ascension: 07^{h} 06.4^{m} –08^{h} 11.4^{m}
- Declination: 13.22°–−0.36°
- Area: 183 sq. deg. (71st)
- Main stars: 2
- Bayer/Flamsteed stars: 14
- Stars brighter than 3.00^{m}: 2
- Stars within 10.00 pc (32.62 ly): 4
- Brightest star: Procyon (α CMi) (0.34^{m})
- Nearest star: Procyon (α CMi)
- Messier objects: 0
- Meteor showers: Canis-Minorids
- Bordering constellations: Monoceros; Gemini; Cancer; Hydra
- Visible at latitudes between +90° and −77°. Best visible at 21:00 (9 p.m.) during the month of February.

Canis Minor is a small constellation in the northern celestial hemisphere. In the second century, it was included as an asterism, or pattern, of two stars in Ptolemy's 48 constellations, and it is counted among the 88 modern constellations. Its name is Latin for "lesser dog", in contrast to Canis Major, the "greater dog"; both figures are commonly represented as following the constellation of Orion the hunter.

Canis Minor contains only two stars brighter than the fourth magnitude, Procyon (Alpha Canis Minoris), with a magnitude of 0.34, and Gomeisa (Beta Canis Minoris), with a magnitude of 2.9. The constellation's dimmer stars were noted by Johann Bayer, who named eight stars including Alpha and Beta, and John Flamsteed, who numbered fourteen. Procyon is the eighth-brightest star in the night sky, as well as one of the closest. A yellow-white main-sequence star, it has a white dwarf companion. Gomeisa is a blue-white main-sequence star. Luyten's Star is a ninth-magnitude red dwarf and the Solar System's next closest stellar neighbour in the constellation after Procyon. Additionally, Procyon and Luyten's Star are only 1.12 light-years away from each other, and Procyon would be the brightest star in Luyten's Star's sky. The fourth-magnitude HD 66141, which has evolved into an orange giant towards the end of its life cycle, was discovered to have a planet in 2012. There are two faint deep-sky objects within the constellation's borders. The 11 Canis-Minorids are a meteor shower that can be seen in early December.

== History and mythology ==
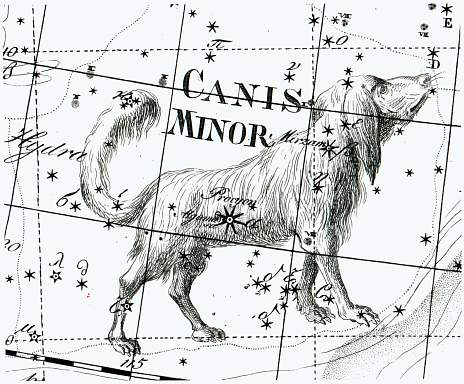
Canis Minor, as depicted by Johann Bode in his 1801 work Uranographia

Though strongly associated with the Classical Greek uranographic tradition, Canis Minor originates from ancient Mesopotamia. Procyon and Gomeisa were called MASH.TAB.BA or "twins" in the Three Stars Each tablets, dating to around 1100 BC. In the later MUL.APIN, this name was also applied to the pairs of Pi^{3} and Pi^{4} Orionis and Zeta and Xi Orionis. The meaning of MASH.TAB.BA evolved as well, becoming the twin deities Lulal and Latarak, who are on the opposite side of the sky from Papsukkal, the True Shepherd of Heaven in Babylonian mythology. Canis Minor was also given the name DAR.LUGAL, its position defined as "the star which stands behind it [Orion]", in the MUL.APIN; the constellation represents a rooster. This name may have also referred to the constellation Lepus. DAR.LUGAL was also denoted DAR.MUŠEN and DAR.LUGAL.MUŠEN in Babylonia. Canis Minor was then called tarlugallu in Akkadian astronomy.

Canis Minor was one of the original 48 constellations formulated by Ptolemy in his second-century Almagest, in which it was defined as a specific pattern (asterism) of stars; Ptolemy identified only two stars and hence no depiction was possible. The Ancient Greeks called the constellation προκυων/Procyon, "coming before the dog", transliterated into Latin as Antecanis, Praecanis, or variations thereof, by Cicero and others. Roman writers also appended the descriptors parvus, minor or minusculus ("small" or "lesser", for its faintness), septentrionalis ("northerly", for its position in relation to Canis Major), primus (rising "first") or sinister (rising to the "left") to its name Canis. In Greek mythology, Canis Minor was sometimes connected with the Teumessian Fox, a beast turned into stone with its hunter, Laelaps, by Zeus, who placed them in heaven as Canis Major (Laelaps) and Canis Minor (Teumessian Fox). Eratosthenes accompanied the Little Dog with Orion, while Hyginus linked the constellation with Maera, a dog owned by Icarius of Athens. On discovering the latter's death, the dog and Icarius' daughter Erigone took their lives and all three were placed in the sky—Erigone as Virgo and Icarius as Boötes. As a reward for his faithfulness, the dog was placed along the "banks" of the Milky Way, which the ancients believed to be a heavenly river, where he would never suffer from thirst.

The medieval Arabic astronomers maintained the depiction of Canis Minor (al-Kalb al-Asghar in Arabic) as a dog; in his Book of the Fixed Stars, Abd al-Rahman al-Sufi included a diagram of the constellation with a canine figure superimposed. There was one slight difference between the Ptolemaic vision of Canis Minor and the Arabic; al-Sufi claims Mirzam, now assigned to Canis Major, as part of both Canis Minor—the collar of the dog—and its modern home. The Arabic names for both Procyon and Gomeisa alluded to their proximity and resemblance to Sirius, though they were not direct translations of the Greek; Procyon was called ash-Shi'ra ash-Shamiya, the "Syrian Sirius" and Gomeisa was called ash-Shira al-Ghamisa, the Sirius with bleary eyes. Among the Merazig of Tunisia, shepherds note six constellations that mark the passage of the dry, hot season. One of them, called Merzem, includes the stars of Canis Minor and Canis Major and is the herald of two weeks of hot weather.

The ancient Egyptians thought of this constellation as Anubis, the jackal god.

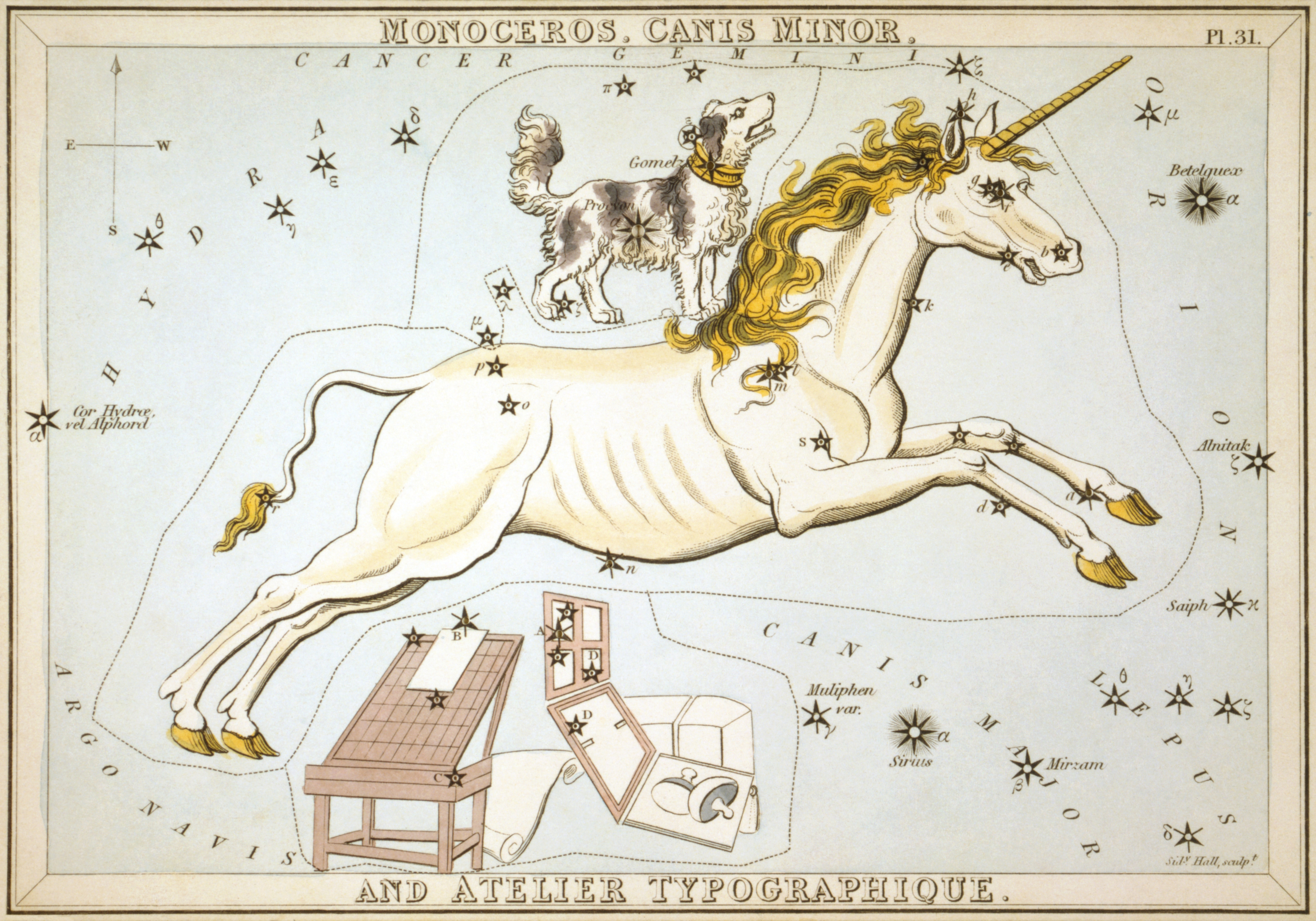
The constellation Canis Minor can be seen alongside Monoceros and the obsolete constellation Atelier Typographique in this 1825 star chart from Urania's Mirror.

Alternative names have been proposed: Johann Bayer in the early 17th century termed the constellation Fovea "The Pit", and Morus "Sycamine Tree". Seventeenth-century German poet and author Philippus Caesius linked it to the dog of Tobias from the Apocrypha. Richard A. Proctor gave the constellation the name Felis "the Cat" in 1870 (contrasting with Canis Major, which he had abbreviated to Canis "the Dog"), explaining that he sought to shorten the constellation names to make them more manageable on celestial charts. Occasionally, Canis Minor is confused with Canis Major and given the name Canis Orionis ("Orion's Dog").

=== In non-Western astronomy ===
In Chinese astronomy, the stars corresponding to Canis Minor lie in the Vermilion Bird of the South (南方朱雀, Nán Fāng Zhū Què). Procyon, Gomeisa and Eta Canis Minoris form an asterism known as Nánhé, the Southern River. With its counterpart, the Northern River Beihe (Castor and Pollux), Nánhé was also associated with a gate or sentry. Along with Zeta and 8 Cancri, 6 Canis Minoris and 11 Canis Minoris formed the asterism Shuiwei, which literally means "water level". Combined with additional stars in Gemini, Shuiwei represented an official who managed floodwaters or a marker of the water level. Neighboring Korea recognized four stars in Canis Minor as part of a different constellation, "the position of the water". This constellation was located in the Red Bird, the southern portion of the sky.

Polynesian peoples often did not recognize Canis Minor as a constellation, but they saw Procyon as significant and often named it; in the Tuamotu Archipelago it was known as Hiro, meaning "twist as a thread of coconut fiber", and Kopu-nui-o-Hiro ("great paunch of Hiro"), which was either a name for the modern figure of Canis Minor or an alternative name for Procyon. Other names included Vena (after a goddess), on Mangaia and Puanga-hori (false Puanga, the name for Rigel), in New Zealand. In the Society Islands, Procyon was called Ana-tahua-vahine-o-toa-te-manava, literally "Aster the priestess of brave heart", figuratively the "pillar for elocution". The Wardaman people of the Northern Territory in Australia gave Procyon and Gomeisa the names Magum and Gurumana, describing them as humans who were transformed into gum trees in the Dreaming. Although their skin had turned to bark, they were able to speak with a human voice by rustling their leaves.

The Aztec calendar was related to their cosmology. The stars of Canis Minor were incorporated along with some stars of Orion and Gemini into an asterism associated with the day called "Water".

== Characteristics ==
Lying directly south of Gemini's bright stars Castor and Pollux, Canis Minor is a small constellation bordered by Monoceros to the south, Gemini to the north, Cancer to the northeast, and Hydra to the east. It does not border Canis Major; Monoceros is in between the two. Covering 183 square degrees, Canis Minor ranks seventy-first of the 88 constellations in size. It appears prominently in the southern sky during the Northern Hemisphere's winter. The constellation boundaries, as set by Belgian astronomer Eugène Delporte in 1930, are defined by a polygon of 14 sides. In the equatorial coordinate system, the right ascension coordinates of these borders lie between 07^{h} 06.4^{m} and 08^{h} 11.4^{m} , while the declination coordinates are between 13.22° and −0.36°. Most visible in the evening sky from January to March, Canis Minor is most prominent at 10 p.m. during mid-February. It is then seen earlier in the evening until July, when it is only visible after sunset before setting itself, and rising in the morning sky before dawn. The constellation's three-letter abbreviation, as adopted by the International Astronomical Union in 1922, is "CMi".

== Features ==
=== Stars ===
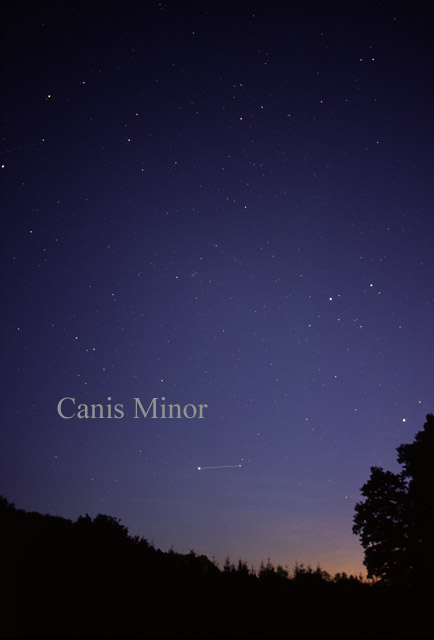
The constellation Canis Minor as it can be seen by the naked eye

Canis Minor contains only two stars brighter than fourth magnitude. At magnitude 0.34, Procyon, or Alpha Canis Minoris, is the eighth-brightest star in the night sky, as well as one of the closest. Its name means "before the dog" or "preceding the dog" in Greek, as it rises an hour before the "Dog Star", Sirius, of Canis Major. It is a binary star system, consisting of a yellow-white main-sequence star of spectral type F5 IV-V, named Procyon A, and a faint white dwarf companion of spectral type DA, named Procyon B. Procyon B, which orbits the more massive star every 41 years, is of magnitude 10.7. Procyon A is 1.4 times the Sun's mass, while its smaller companion is 0.6 times as massive as the Sun. The system is 11.4 light-years (3.5 parsecs) from Earth, the shortest distance to a northern-hemisphere star of the first magnitude. Gomeisa, or Beta Canis Minoris, with a magnitude of 2.89, is the second-brightest star in Canis Minor. Lying 160 ± 10 light-years (49.1 ± 3.1 parsecs) from the Solar System, it is a blue-white main-sequence star of spectral class B8 Ve. Although fainter to Earth observers, it is much brighter than Procyon, and is 250 times as luminous and three times as massive as the Sun. Although its variations are slight, Gomeisa is classified as a shell star (Gamma Cassiopeiae variable), with a maximum magnitude of 2.84 and a minimum magnitude of 2.92. It is surrounded by a disk of gas which it heats and causes to emit radiation.

Johann Bayer used the Greek letters Alpha to Eta to label the most prominent eight stars in the constellation, designating two stars as Delta (named Delta^{1} and Delta^{2}). John Flamsteed numbered fourteen stars, discerning a third star he named Delta^{3}; his star 12 Canis Minoris was not found subsequently. In Bayer's 1603 work Uranometria, Procyon is located on the dog's belly, and Gomeisa on its neck. Gamma, Epsilon and Eta Canis Minoris lie nearby, marking the dog's neck, crown and chest, respectively. Although it has an apparent magnitude of 4.34, Gamma Canis Minoris is an orange K-type giant of spectral class K3-III C, which lies 318 light-years (97 parsecs) away. Its colour is obvious when seen through binoculars. It is a multiple system, consisting of the spectroscopic binary Gamma A and three optical companions, Gamma B, magnitude 13; Gamma C, magnitude 12; and Gamma D, magnitude 10. The two components of Gamma A orbit each other every 389.2 days, with an eccentric orbit that takes their separation between 2.3 and 1.4 astronomical units (AU). Epsilon Canis Minoris is a yellow bright giant of spectral class G6.5IIb of magnitude of 4.99. It lies 730–810 light-years (220–250 parsecs) from Earth, with 13 times the diameter and 750 times the luminosity of the Sun. Eta Canis Minoris is a giant of spectral class F0III of magnitude 5.24, which has a yellowish hue when viewed through binoculars as well as a faint companion of magnitude 11.1. Located 4 arcseconds from the primary, the companion star is actually around 440 AU from the main star and takes around 5,000 years to orbit it.

Near Procyon, three stars share the name Delta Canis Minoris. Delta^{1} is a yellow-white F-type giant of magnitude 5.25 located around 790 light-years (240 parsecs) from Earth. About 360 times as luminous and 3.75 times as massive as the Sun, it is expanding and cooling as it ages, having spent much of its life as a main sequence star of spectrum B6V. Also known as 8 Canis Minoris, Delta^{2} is an F-type main-sequence star of spectral type F2V and magnitude 5.59 which is 136 light-years (42 parsecs) distant. The last of the trio, Delta^{3} (also known as 9 Canis Minoris), is a white main sequence star of spectral type A0Vnn and magnitude 5.83 which is 680 light-years (210 parsecs) distant. These stars mark the paws of the Lesser Dog's left hind leg, while magnitude 5.13 Zeta marks the right. A blue-white bright giant of spectral type B8II, Zeta lies around 623 light-years (191 parsecs) away from the Solar System.

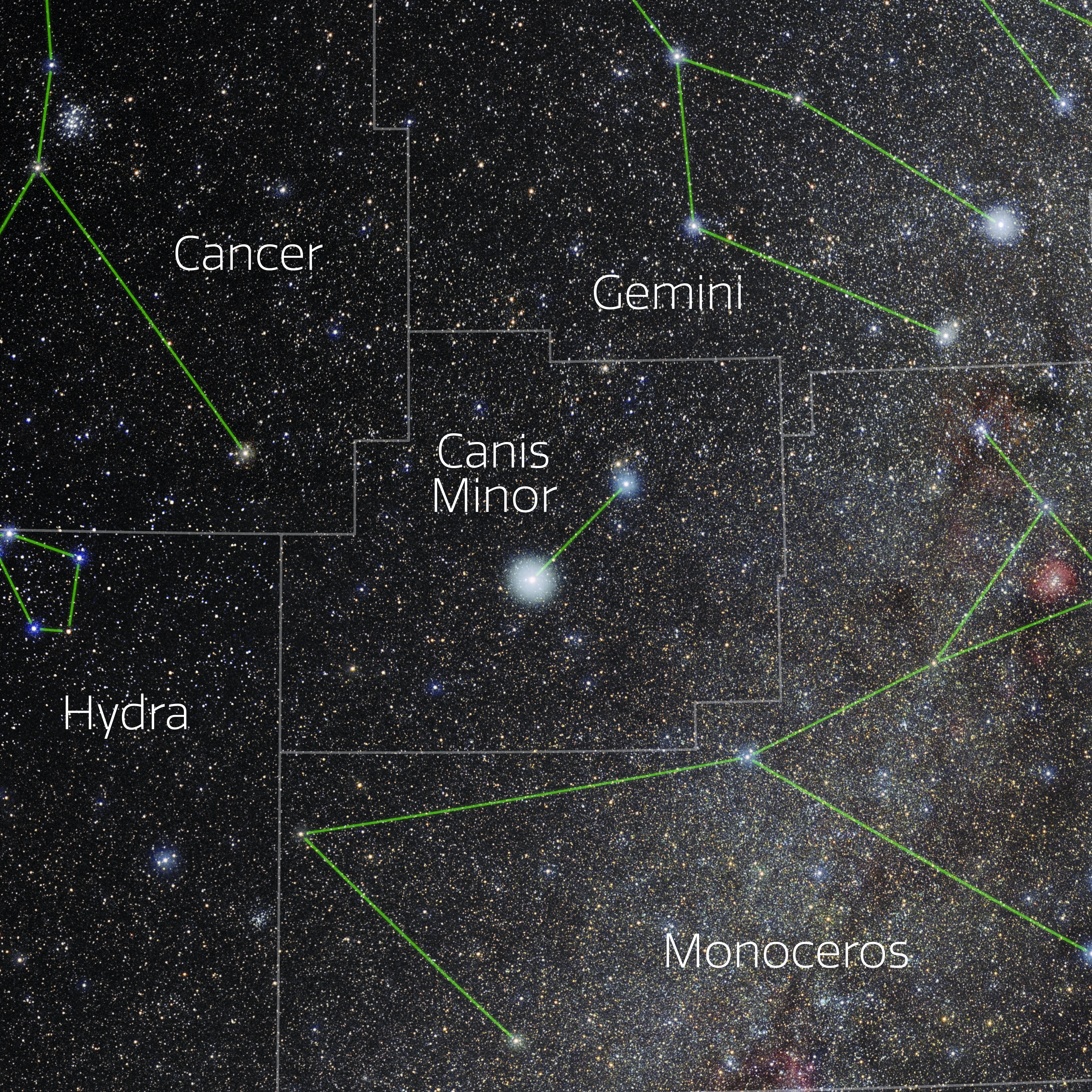
The constellation Canis Minor showing the IAU boundaries, the constellation stick figure, and labels for its brightest stars. Astrophotograph by Eckhard Slawik, from NOIRLab's 88 Constellations project.

Lying 222 ± 7 light-years away with an apparent magnitude of 4.39, HD 66141 is 6.8 billion years old and has evolved into an orange giant of spectral type K2III with a diameter around 22 times that of the Sun, and weighing 1.1 solar masses. It is 174 times as luminous as the Sun, with an absolute magnitude of −0.15. HD 66141 was mistakenly named 13 Puppis, as its celestial coordinates were recorded incorrectly when catalogued and hence mistakenly thought to be in the constellation of Puppis; Bode gave it the name Lambda Canis Minoris, which is now obsolete. The orange giant is orbited by a planet, HD 66141b, which was detected in 2012 by measuring the star's radial velocity. The planet has a mass around 6 times that of Jupiter and a period of 480 days.

A red giant of spectral type M4III, BC Canis Minoris lies around 500 light-years (150 parsecs) distant from the Solar System. It is a semiregular variable star that varies between a maximum magnitude of 6.14 and minimum magnitude of 6.42. Periods of 27.7, 143.3 and 208.3 days have been recorded in its pulsations. AZ, AD and BI Canis Minoris are Delta Scuti variables—short period (six hours at most) pulsating stars that have been used as standard candles and as subjects to study astroseismology. AZ is of spectral type A5IV, and ranges between magnitudes 6.44 and 6.51 over a period of 2.3 hours. AD has a spectral type of F2III, and has a maximum magnitude of 9.21 and minimum of 9.51, with a period of approximately 2.95 hours. BI is of spectral type F2 with an apparent magnitude varying around 9.19 and a period of approximately 2.91 hours.

At least three red giants are Mira variables in Canis Minor. S Canis Minoris, of spectral type M7e, is the brightest, ranging from magnitude 6.6 to 13.2 over a period of 332.94 days. V Canis Minoris ranges from magnitude 7.4 to 15.1 over a period of 366.1 days. Similar in magnitude is R Canis Minoris, which has a maximum of 7.3, but a significantly brighter minimum of 11.6. An S-type star, it has a period of 337.8 days.

YZ Canis Minoris is a red dwarf of spectral type M4.5V and magnitude 11.2, roughly three times the size of Jupiter and 20 light-years (6.1 parsecs) from Earth. It is a flare star, emitting unpredictable outbursts of energy for mere minutes, which might be much more powerful analogues of solar flares. Luyten's Star (GJ 273) is a red dwarf star of spectral type M3.5V and close neighbour of the Solar System. Its visual magnitude of 9.9 renders it too faint to be seen with the naked eye, even though it is only 12.39 light-years (3.80 parsecs) away. Fainter still is PSS 544-7, an eighteenth-magnitude red dwarf around 20 per cent the mass of the Sun, located 685 light-years (210 parsecs) from Earth. First noticed in 1991, it is thought to be a cannonball star, shot out of a star cluster and now moving rapidly through space directly away from the galactic disc.

The WZ Sagittae-type dwarf nova DY Canis Minoris (also known as VSX J074727.6+065050) flared up to magnitude 11.4 over January and February 2008 before dropping eight magnitudes to around 19.5 over approximately 80 days. It is a remote binary star system where a white dwarf and low-mass star orbit each other close enough for the former star to draw material off the latter and form an accretion disc. This material builds up until it erupts dramatically.

=== Deep-sky objects ===
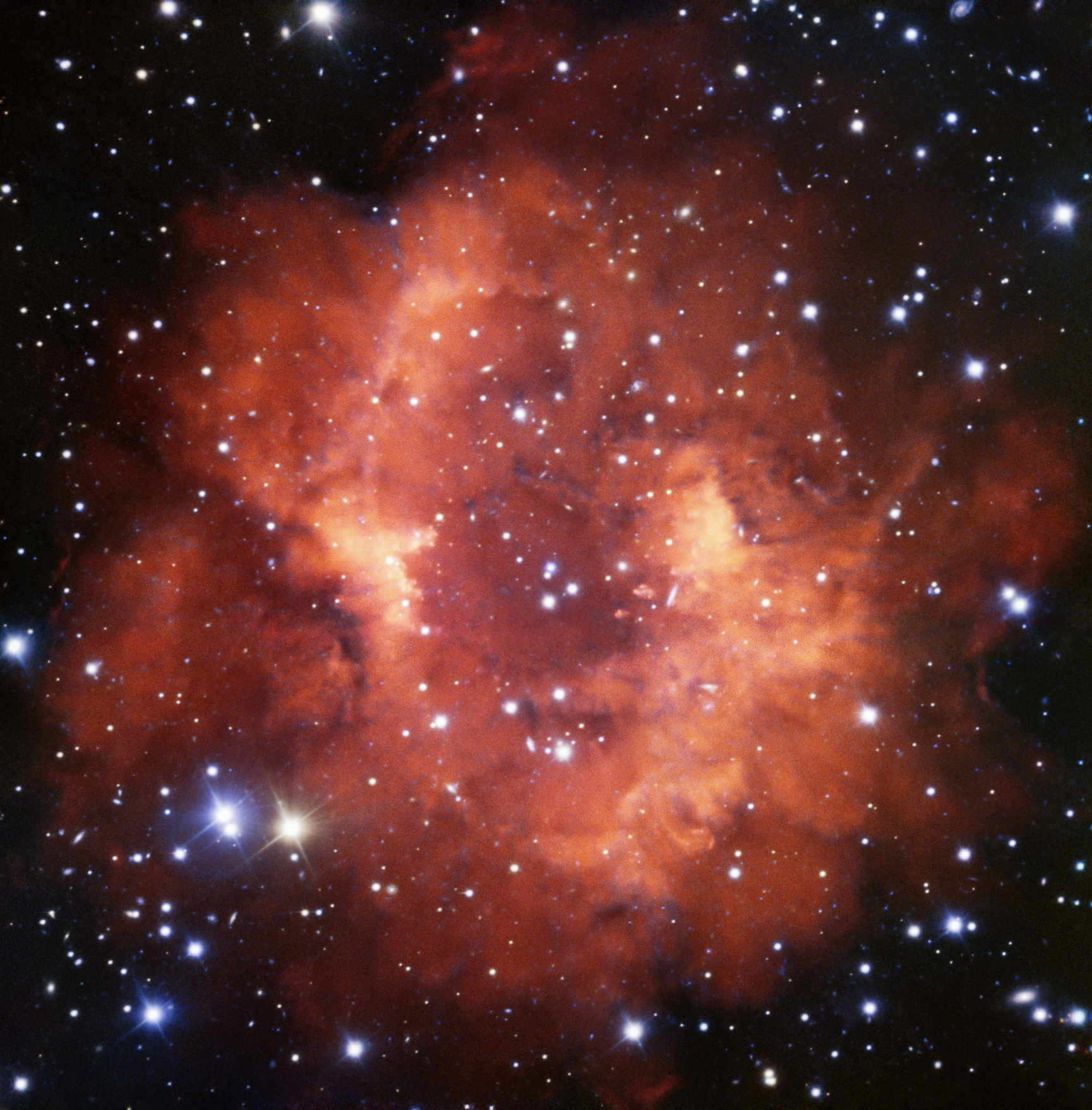
Nebula Abell 24

The Milky Way passes through much of Canis Minor, yet it has few deep-sky objects. William Herschel recorded four objects in his 1786 work Catalogue of Nebulae and Clusters of Stars, including two he mistakenly believed were star clusters. NGC 2459 is a group of five thirteenth- and fourteenth-magnitude stars that appear to lie close together in the sky but are not related. A similar situation has occurred with NGC 2394, also in Canis Minor. This is a collection of fifteen unrelated stars of ninth magnitude and fainter.

Herschel also observed three faint galaxies, two of which are interacting with each other. NGC 2508 is a lenticular galaxy of thirteenth magnitude, estimated at 205 million light-years' distance (63 million parsecs) with a diameter of 80,000 light-years (25,000 parsecs). Named as a single object by Herschel, NGC 2402 is actually a pair of near-adjacent galaxies that appear to be interacting with each other. Only of fourteenth and fifteenth magnitudes, respectively, the elliptical and spiral galaxy are thought to be approximately 245 million light-years distant, and each measure 55,000 light-years in diameter.

=== Meteor showers ===
The 11 Canis-Minorids, also called the Beta Canis Minorids, are a meteor shower that arise near the fifth-magnitude star 11 Canis Minoris and were discovered in 1964 by Keith Hindley, who investigated their trajectory and proposed a common origin with the comet D/1917 F1 Mellish. However, this conclusion has been refuted subsequently as the number of orbits analysed was low and their trajectories too disparate to confirm a link. They last from 4 to 15 December, peaking over 10 and 11 December.

== Sources ==
- Wagman, Morton (2003). Lost Stars: Lost, Missing and Troublesome Stars from the Catalogues of Johannes Bayer, Nicholas Louis de Lacaille, John Flamsteed, and Sundry Others. Blacksburg, VA: The McDonald & Woodward Publishing Company. ISBN 978-0-939923-78-6.
