= 6 Canis Minoris =

Star in the constellation Canis Minor

- Location of 6 Canis Minoris (circled in red)

Observation data Epoch J2000.0 Equinox ICRS
- Constellation: Canis Minor
- Right ascension: 07^{h} 29^{m} 47.78172^{s}
- Declination: +12° 00′ 23.6347″
- Apparent magnitude (V): +4.55

Characteristics
- Evolutionary stage: giant
- Spectral type: K1 III
- B−V color index: 1.276±0.001

Astrometry
Radial velocity (R_{v})	−16.31±0.13 km/s
Proper motion (μ)	RA: −0.57 mas/yr Dec.: −18.85 mas/yr
Parallax (π)	5.70±0.21 mas
Distance	570 ± 20 ly (175 ± 6 pc)
Absolute magnitude (M_{V})	−1.67

Details
Mass	4.0 M_{☉}
Radius	44 R_{☉}
Luminosity	794 L_{☉}
Surface gravity (log g)	1.45 cgs
Temperature	4,336 K
Metallicity [Fe/H]	−0.12 dex
Rotational velocity (v sin i)	1.7 km/s
Age	179 Myr

Other designations
- 6 CMi, BD+12°1567, FK5 1193, GC 10024, HD 59294, HIP 36425, HR 2864, SAO 96952

Database references
SIMBAD	data

6 Canis Minoris is a star in the equatorial constellation of Canis Minor, located around 570 light years away from the Sun. It is visible to the naked eye as a faint, orange-hued star with an apparent visual magnitude of +4.55. This object is moving closer to the Earth with a heliocentric radial velocity of −16.3 km/s. Kinematically, it is a member of an outlying group belonging to the Ursa Major flow of the Sirius supercluster.

This is an evolved giant star with a stellar classification of K1 III. It has a mild barium anomaly, which may indicate this is a binary star system with a white dwarf companion. The interferometry-measured angular diameter of the visible component is about 2.31±0.03 mas, which, at its estimated distance, equates to a physical radius of about 44 times the radius of the Sun. This star has about four times the mass of the Sun and is radiating 794 times the Sun's luminosity from its enlarged photosphere at an effective temperature of 4,336 K.
