= Delta1 Canis Minoris =

Star in the constellation Canis Minor

δ^{1} Canis Minoris
- Location of δ^{1} Canis Minoris (circled)

Observation data Epoch J2000.0 Equinox J2000.0 (ICRS)
- Constellation: Canis Minor
- Right ascension: 07^{h} 32^{m} 05.949^{s}
- Declination: +01° 54′ 52.13″
- Apparent magnitude (V): +5.25

Characteristics
- Evolutionary stage: subgiant
- Spectral type: F0 III or F0 V
- U−B color index: +0.20
- B−V color index: +0.22

Astrometry
Radial velocity (R_{v})	+29.1±2.8 km/s
Proper motion (μ)	RA: −2.129 mas/yr Dec.: −0.868 mas/yr
Parallax (π)	3.9896±0.0775 mas
Distance	820 ± 20 ly (251 ± 5 pc)
Absolute magnitude (M_{V})	−1.59

Details
Mass	4.34±0.11 M_{☉}
Radius	11.6±0.4 R_{☉}
Luminosity	542^{+26}_{−22} L_{☉}
Surface gravity (log g)	3.40±0.05 cgs
Temperature	7,210+243 −86 K
Metallicity [Fe/H]	+0.15±0.05 dex
Rotational velocity (v sin i)	50 km/s

Other designations
- δ^{1} CMi, 7 CMi, BD+02°1691, FK5 2587, GC 10085, HD 59881, HIP 36641, HR 2880, SAO 115581

Database references
SIMBAD	data

Delta^{1} Canis Minoris is a solitary, yellow-white hued star in the constellation Canis Minor. Its name is a Bayer designation that is Latinized from δ^{1} Canis Minoris, and abbreviated Delta^{1} CMi or δ^{1} CMi. This star is faintly visible to the naked eye with an apparent visual magnitude of +5.25. Based upon an annual parallax shift of 3.99 mas as seen from Earth, this star is located roughly 820 light years from the Sun. It is drifting further away with a line of sight velocity of +29 km/s.

Houk and Swift (1999) list a stellar classification of F0 V for Delta^{1} Canis Minoris, indicating it is an F-type main-sequence star. However, Cowley et al. (1969) gave it a class of F0 III, which would suggest it is instead an evolved giant star. The spectrum displays a higher than solar metallicity – a term indicating the abundance of elements other than hydrogen and helium compared to the Sun. The star is spinning with a projected rotational velocity of 50 km/s. Based on stellar models, it has 4.3 times the mass of the Sun and 11.6 times the Sun's radius. It is radiating 542 times the Sun's luminosity from its photosphere at an effective temperature of 7,210 K.
