= Delta3 Canis Minoris =

Star in the constellation Canis Minor

δ^{3} Canis Minoris
- Location of δ^{3} Canis Minoris (circled)

Observation data Epoch J2000.0 Equinox J2000.0 (ICRS)
- Constellation: Canis Minor
- Right ascension: 07^{h} 34^{m} 15.893^{s}
- Declination: +03° 22′ 18.21″
- Apparent magnitude (V): +5.81

Characteristics
- Evolutionary stage: main sequence
- Spectral type: B9 V
- U−B color index: −0.09
- B−V color index: −0.02

Astrometry
Radial velocity (R_{v})	33.8±2.9 km/s
Proper motion (μ)	RA: −2.534 mas/yr Dec.: −5.305 mas/yr
Parallax (π)	4.603±0.0452 mas
Distance	709 ± 7 ly (217 ± 2 pc)
Absolute magnitude (M_{V})	+0.77

Details
Mass	3.16±0.09 M_{☉}
Radius	5.3 R_{☉}
Luminosity	175 L_{☉}
Surface gravity (log g)	4.0 cgs
Temperature	9,500 K
Rotational velocity (v sin i)	259 km/s
Age	108 Myr

Other designations
- δ^{3} CMi, 9 CMi, BD+03°1719, GC 10128, HD 60357, HIP 36812, HR 2901, SAO 115644, CCDM 07343+0322, WDS J07343+0322A

Database references
SIMBAD	data

Delta^{3} Canis Minoris is a solitary, white-hued star in the equatorial constellation of Canis Minor. Its name is a Bayer designation that is Latinized from δ^{3} Canis Minoris, and abbreviated Delta^{3} CMi or δ^{3} CMi. With an apparent visual magnitude of +5.81, it is just bright enough to be faintly visible to the naked eye. Based upon a parallax of 4.60 mas as seen from Gaia spacecraft, this star is about 730 light years away from the Solar System. At that distance, the visual magnitude of these stars is diminished by an extinction of more than 0.15 due to interstellar dust. It is drifting further away with a line of sight velocity of 34 km/s.

This is a B-type main-sequence star with a stellar classification of B9 V. At the estimated age of 310 million years, it is about 93.7%±2.9% of the way through its main sequence lifetime and is spinning rapidly with a projected rotational velocity of 259 km/s. The star has an estimated 3.16 times the mass of the Sun and about five times the Sun's radius. It is radiating 175 times the Sun's luminosity from its photosphere at an effective temperature of 9,500 K.
