= 11 Canis Minoris =

Star in the constellation Canis Minor

- Location of 11 Canis Minoris (circled in red)

Observation data Epoch J2000.0 Equinox J2000.0 (ICRS)
- Constellation: Canis Minor
- Right ascension: 07^{h} 46^{m} 16.20081^{s}
- Declination: +10° 46′ 05.7055″
- Apparent magnitude (V): 5.25

Characteristics
- Spectral type: A1Vnn
- B−V color index: 0.018±0.008

Astrometry
Radial velocity (R_{v})	+28.0±4.2 km/s
Proper motion (μ)	RA: −29.902 mas/yr Dec.: −25.275 mas/yr
Parallax (π)	10.4262±0.2007 mas
Distance	313 ± 6 ly (96 ± 2 pc)
Absolute magnitude (M_{V})	0.42

Details
Mass	2.23 M_{☉}
Radius	2.5 R_{☉}
Luminosity	65.26 L_{☉}
Surface gravity (log g)	3.60 cgs
Temperature	9,972±339 K
Age	149 Myr

Other designations
- 11 CMi, NSV 3724, BD+11°1670, FK5 1201, GC 10463, HD 62832, HIP 37921, HR 3008, SAO 97224

Database references
SIMBAD	data

11 Canis Minoris is a single star in the equatorial constellation of Canis Minor, located around 313 light years away from the Sun. It is visible to the naked eye as a faint, white-hued star with an apparent visual magnitude of 5.25. This object is moving away from the Earth with a heliocentric radial velocity of +28 km/s, having come to within 157 light-years some 2.35 million years ago.

This is an A-type main-sequence star with a stellar classification of A1Vnn, where the 'n' notation indicates (very) "nebulous" lines due to rapid rotation. However, Gray and Garrison (1987) found a class of A0.5 IVnn, which would instead match an evolving subgiant star. It is a suspected variable star of unknown type. This object is 149 million years old with 2.23 times the mass of the Sun and about 2.5 times the Sun's radius. It is radiating 65 times the Sun's luminosity from its photosphere at an effective temperature of 9,972 K.
