= Epsilon Canis Minoris =

Suspected binary star system in the constellation Canis Minor

ε Canis Minoris
- Location of ε Canis Minoris (circled)

Observation data Epoch J2000.0 Equinox J2000.0 (ICRS)
- Constellation: Canis Minor
- Right ascension: 07^{h} 25^{m} 38.900^{s}
- Declination: +09° 16′ 33.93″
- Apparent magnitude (V): +5.002

Characteristics
- Evolutionary stage: horizontal branch
- Spectral type: G6 IIb
- U−B color index: +0.774
- B−V color index: +1.004

Astrometry
Radial velocity (R_{v})	−7.8±1.3 km/s
Proper motion (μ)	RA: −4.583 mas/yr Dec.: −8.414 mas/yr
Parallax (π)	3.9908±0.0811 mas
Distance	820 ± 20 ly (251 ± 5 pc)
Absolute magnitude (M_{V})	−2.62

Details
Mass	4.63±0.17 M_{☉}
Radius	45.51±4.34 R_{☉}
Luminosity	1,086.5±197.8 L_{☉}
Surface gravity (log g)	1.81±0.06 cgs
Temperature	4,916±70 K
Metallicity [Fe/H]	−0.12±0.10 dex
Rotational velocity (v sin i)	8 km/s
Age	140±10 Myr

Other designations
- ε CMi, 2 CMi, BD+09°1643, GC 9908, HD 58367, HIP 36041, HR 2828, SAO 115425

Database references
SIMBAD	data

Epsilon Canis Minoris is a suspected binary star system in the equatorial constellation of Canis Minor. Its name is a Bayer designation that is Latinized from ε Canis Minoris, and abbreviated Epsilon CMi or ε CMi. This is a fifth magnitude star, which means it is bright enough to be faintly visible to the naked eye. Based upon an annual parallax shift of 3.99 mas as seen from Earth, this star is located approximately 820 light years from the Sun, give or take a 20 light year margin of error. It is drifting closer to the Sun with a line of sight velocity of −8 km/s.

This is an evolved G-type bright giant star with a stellar classification of G6 IIb. It is most likely (99% chance) on the horizontal branch, and is a barium star that shows an abnormal overabundance of barium in its spectrum. This s-process element may have been accreted from a now white dwarf companion during a previous stage of its evolution. The bright giant component has an estimated 4.63 times the mass of the Sun and has expanded to 45.5 times the Sun's radius. The star is radiating 1,087 times the Sun's luminosity from its enlarged photosphere at an effective temperature of about 4,916 K.
