= Stallia gens =

Ancient Roman family

The gens Stallia was an obscure plebeian family at ancient Rome. Hardly any members of this gens are mentioned by ancient writers, but a number are known from inscriptions.

== Origin ==
The nomen Stallius seems to be of Oscan derivation, as most of the Stallii found in inscriptions came from Campania and adjoining regions in southern Italy. The first of the Stallii appearing in history bore the distinctly Oscan praenomen Sthenius.

== Praenomina ==
Besides the early instance of Sthenius, the Stallii mentioned in epigraphy all bore very common praenomina, including Gaius, Marcus, Quintus, Publius, and Lucius.

== Members ==
This list includes abbreviated praenomina. For an explanation of this practice, see filiation.

- Sthenius Stallius, a general of the Lucanians against Thurii in 285 BC. He may be the same person as Statius Statilius, said by Valerius Maximus to have been the Lucanian General defeated and captured by the consul Gaius Fabricius Luscinus, when he relieved the siege of Thurii in 282, but this is not certain.
- Stallia, made an offering to the Dius Pater at Casilinum in Campania during the first half of the first century BC.
- Gaius Stallius, a Roman architect, who along with his brother, Marcus, and the Greek architect Menalippus, rebuilt the Odeon of Pericles at Athens after it was destroyed in the First Mithridatic War.
- Marcus Stallius, a Roman architect, who rebuilt the Odeon of Pericles at Athens, together with his brother, Gaius, and the Greek architect Menalippus.
- Gaius Stallius, surnamed "Hauranus", describes himself as an Epicurean in a sepulchral inscription from Neapolis in Campania, dating to the third quarter of the first century BC.
- Publius Stallius Agatho, appointed to a public office in AD 2 by a decree of the decurions at Pompeii in Campania.
- Quintus Stallius Q. f. Clemens, buried at the present site of Rionero in Vulture, formerly part of Samnium, in a first-century tomb dedicated by his grandmother, Anicia Venusta, for her daughter, Equitia Tertulla, and grandson, Clemens.
- Lucius Stallius Secundus, a freedman, and one of the Seviri Augustales at Tragurium in Dalmatia, who together with his wife, Stallia Callirhoe, made an offering to the Magna Mater, during the first century, or the first half of the second.
- Stallia Callirhoe, a freedwoman, and the wife of Lucius Stallius Secundus, with whom she made an offering to the Magna Mater at Tragurium during the first or second century.
- Marcus Stallius C. f., buried at Casinum, with a monument from his wife, Luta Numisia.
- Publius Stallius Felix, named in a pottery inscription from Pompeii.
- Stallia Haphe Ɔ. l., a freedwoman named in an inscription from Pompeii.
- Marcus Stallius M. l. Philotimus, a freedman buried at Rome, together with Seppia Nice, perhaps his wife.
- Quintus Stallius Clarus, together with his wife, Hosidia Fortunata, sister, Thisbe, and sons Auctus and Naius, dedicated a second-century tomb at Cluviae in Samnium for his son, Marcius Stallius Nepos.
- Marcus Stallius Q. f. Nepos, buried at Cluviae, aged twenty-five years, ten months, and fifteen days, in a second-century tomb dedicated by his parents, Quintus Stallius Clarus and Hosidia Fortunata, aunt Thisbe, and brothers Auctus and Naius.
- Stallius Nepos, dedicated a tomb at Cluviae, dating to the second century or the first half of the third, to his wife, Brinnia Procula, aged twenty years and twenty-three days.

== See also ==
- List of Roman gentes

== Bibliography ==
- Valerius Maximus, Factorum ac Dictorum Memorabilium (Memorable Facts and Sayings).
- Gaius Plinius Secundus (Pliny the Elder), Historia Naturalis (Natural History).
- August Böckh et alii, Corpus Inscriptionum Graecarum (The Body of Greek Inscriptions), Königliche Akademie der Wissenschaften (1828–1877).
- Desiré-Raoul Rochette, Lettre à M. Schorn, Firmin Didot Frères, Paris (1832).
- Dictionary of Greek and Roman Biography and Mythology, William Smith, ed., Little, Brown and Company, Boston (1849).
- Theodor Mommsen et alii, Corpus Inscriptionum Latinarum (The Body of Latin Inscriptions, abbreviated CIL), Berlin-Brandenburgische Akademie der Wissenschaften (1853–present).
- René Cagnat et alii, L'Année épigraphique (The Year in Epigraphy, abbreviated AE), Presses Universitaires de France (1888–present).
- Licia Vlad Borelli, Un Impegno per Pompei, Mailand (1983).
