= Odeon of Athens =

The Odeon of Athens may refer to:

- Odeon of Pericles
- Odeon of Agrippa
- Odeon of Herodes Atticus
