= Opera house =

Theatre building used for opera performances

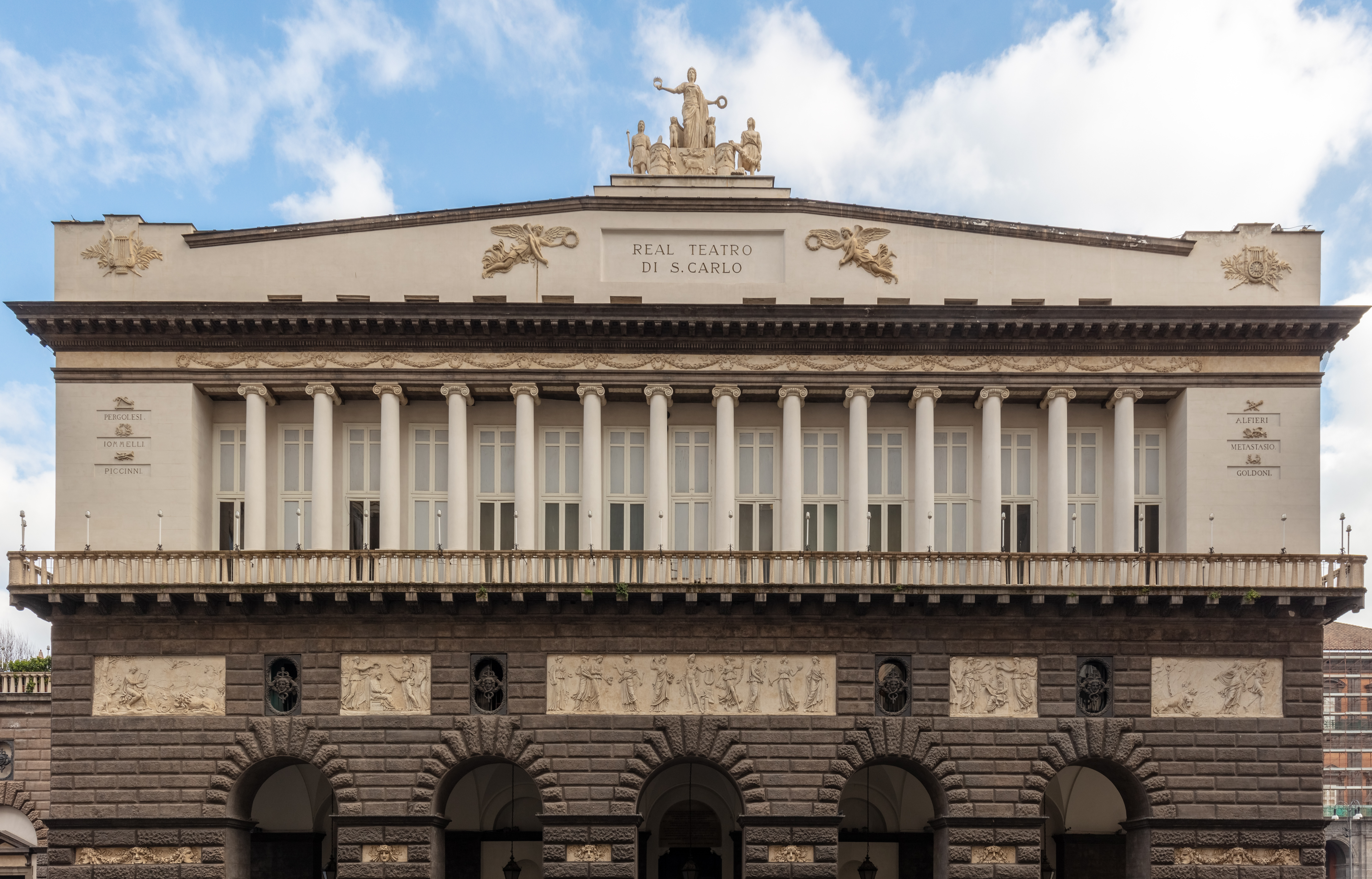
Teatro di San Carlo in Naples, the world's oldest working opera house.

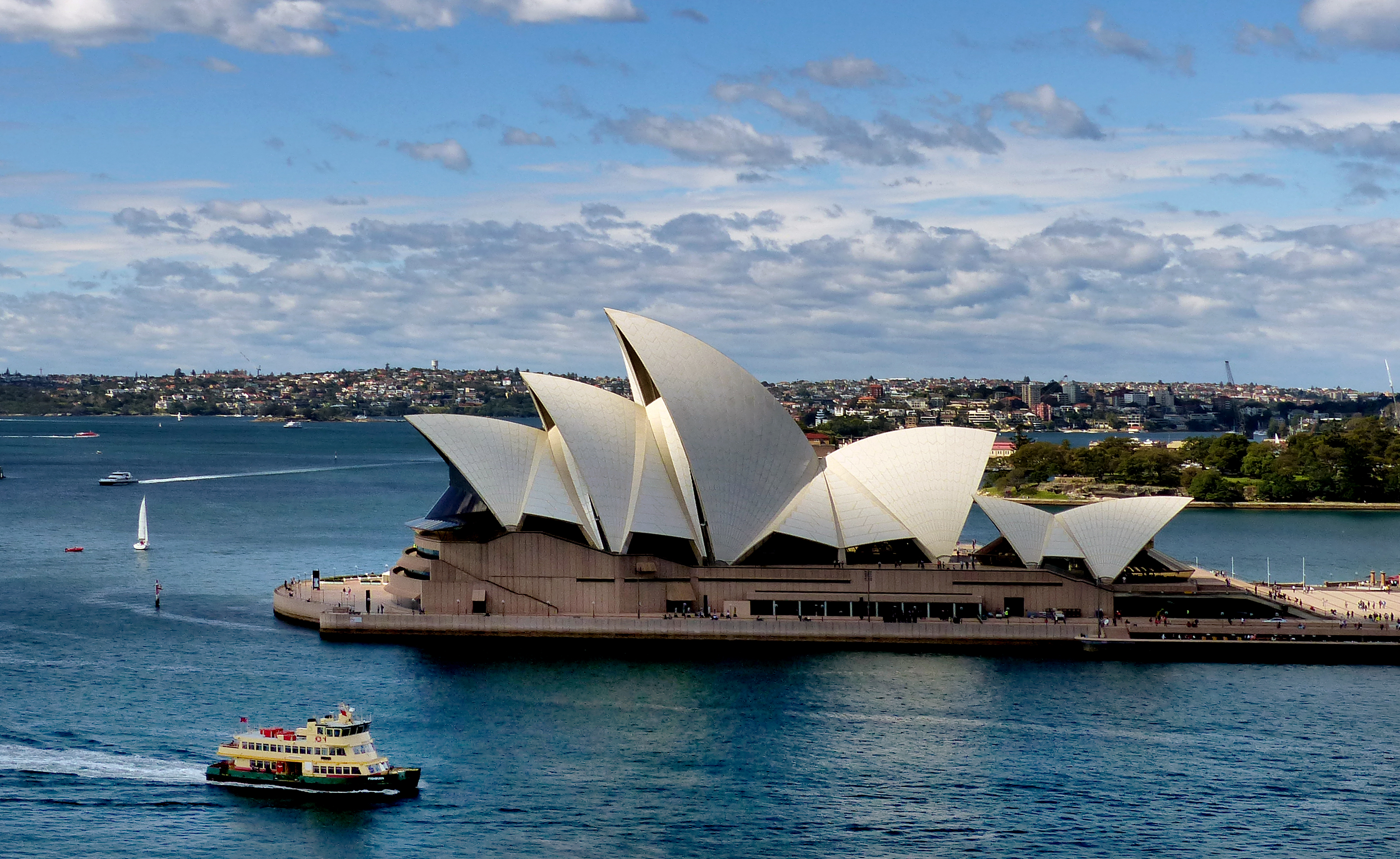
The Sydney Opera House is one of the world's most recognisable opera houses and landmarks.

An opera house is a theater building used for performances of opera. Like many theaters, it usually includes a stage, an orchestra pit, audience seating, backstage facilities for costumes and building sets, as well as offices for the institution's administration.

While some venues are constructed specifically for operas, other opera houses are part of larger performing arts centers. Indeed, the term opera house is often used as a term of prestige for any large performing arts center.

== History ==
=== Greco-Roman antiquity ===
Based on Aristoxenus's musical system, and paying homage to the architects of ancient Greek theater, Vitruvius described, in the 1st century BC, in his treatise De architectura, the ideal acoustics of theaters. He explained the use of brazen vases that Mummius had brought to Rome after having had the theater of Corinth demolished, and as they were probably used in the Theater of Pompey. As wooden theaters were naturally sonorous, these vases, placed between the seats on the stands, served as resonators in the stone buildings: "By means of this arrangement, the voice, which will come from the stage as from a center, will extend in circles, will strike in the cavities of the vases, and will be made stronger and clearer, according to the relationship of consonance that it will have with one of these vases." The odeon built by Pericles near the Theater of Dionysus in Athens was, according to the Suda, intended for the rehearsal of music that was to be sung in the grand theater or, according to Plutarch, for the jury to audition musicians competing for a prize.

Ancient theaters provided the ideal conditions, but it was not yet time for opera: the aim was to worship the deities, not to venerate the muses. The subject was religious, it was accompanied by singing and instrumental music. Worship was public, and the audience was made up of citizens as well as other categories of the population. Four centuries later, the Church abandoned spectacles as practiced in Antiquity. Histrions, representative of Greco-Roman civilization, gradually disappeared.

=== Middle Ages ===
The Middle Ages saw the abandonment of ancient theaters, which were transformed into gigantic stone quarries, like many other ancient buildings, public and private. Music still had its place in worship. It continued to bring audiences together, but its content was completely renewed. The Jeu de Daniel ("Play of Daniel") was a sung play, characteristic of the medieval Renaissance of the 12th century. The subject, taken from the biblical Book of Daniel, deals with Israel's captivity in Babylon. The play was written and performed by students of the Episcopal School of Beauvais, located in northern France. In the 15th century, sung theater of a religious nature found a special place in the mystery plays performed on cathedral squares. As before, they dealt with sacred subjects, but they were not about worship per se. Secular musical theater also existed, but had a more popular and intimate aspect (see, for example, Adam de la Halle's Jeu de Robin et Marion ("Play of Robin and Marion"), in the 13th century).

=== Modern period ===
At the beginning of the 17th century, in Italy, singing underwent yet another renewal, with the emergence of Baroque art at the height of the Renaissance. Italy continues to have many working opera houses, such as the Teatro Massimo in Palermo (the biggest in the country), the Teatro di San Carlo in Naples and the Teatro alla Scala in Milan. The Teatro San Cassiano in Venice was the world's first public opera house, inaugurated as such in 1637.

In the 17th and 18th centuries, opera houses were often financed by rulers, nobles, and wealthy people who used patronage of the arts to endorse their political ambitions and social position. There was no opera house in London when Henry Purcell was composing and the first opera house in Germany, the Oper am Gänsemarkt, was built in Hamburg in 1678, followed by the Oper am Brühl in Leipzig in 1693, and the Opernhaus vorm Salztor in Naumburg in 1701. With the rise of bourgeois and capitalist social forms in the 19th century, European culture moved away from its patronage system to a publicly supported system.

Early United States opera houses served a variety of functions in towns and cities, hosting community dances, fairs, plays, and vaudeville shows as well as operas and other musical events. In the 2000s, most opera and theatre companies are supported by funds from a combination of government and institutional grants, ticket sales, and private donations.

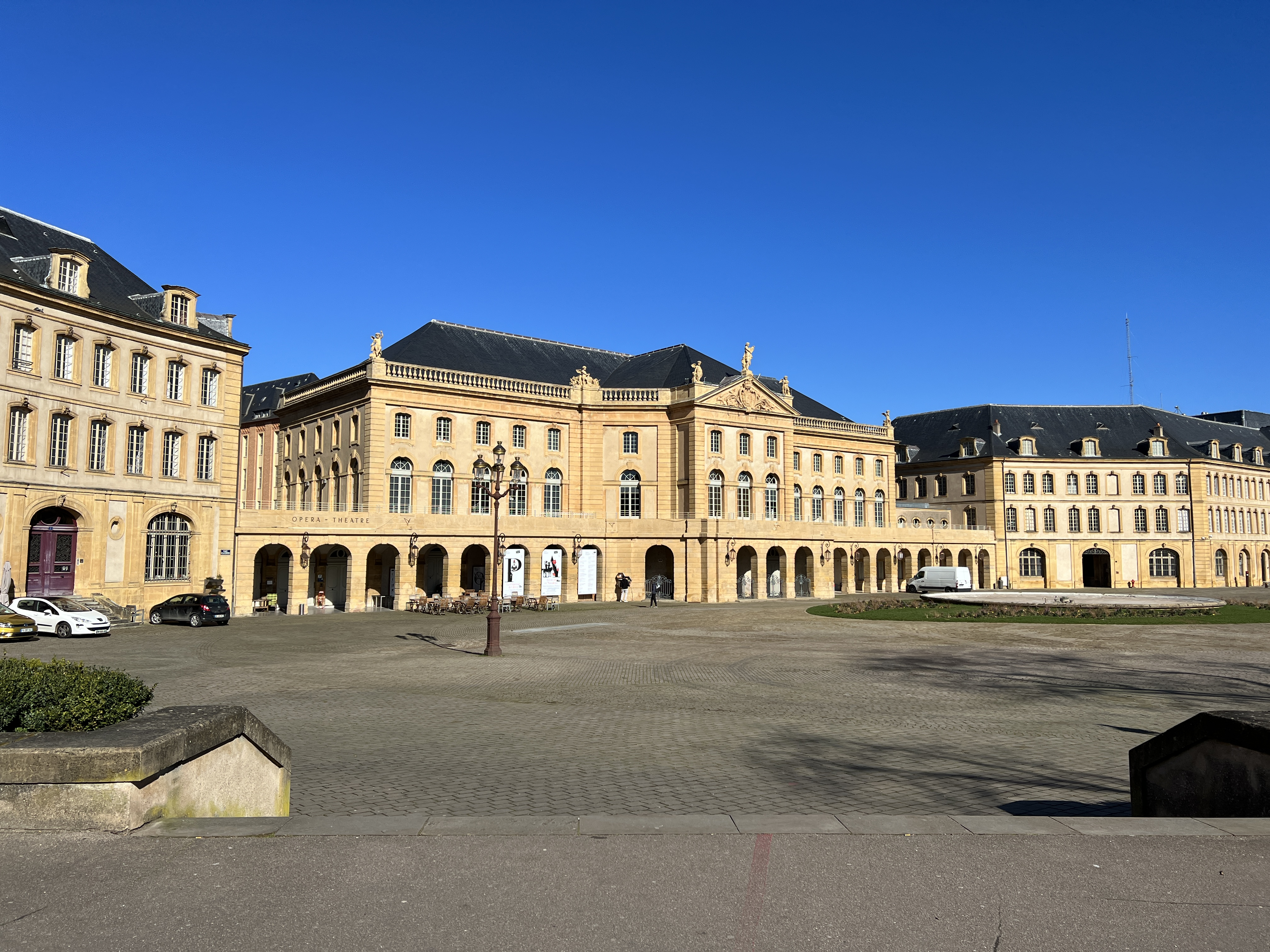
Opéra-Théâtre de Metz Métropole, built by benefactor Charles Louis Auguste Fouquet, duc de Belle-Isle, during the 18th century; it is the oldest opera house working in France.

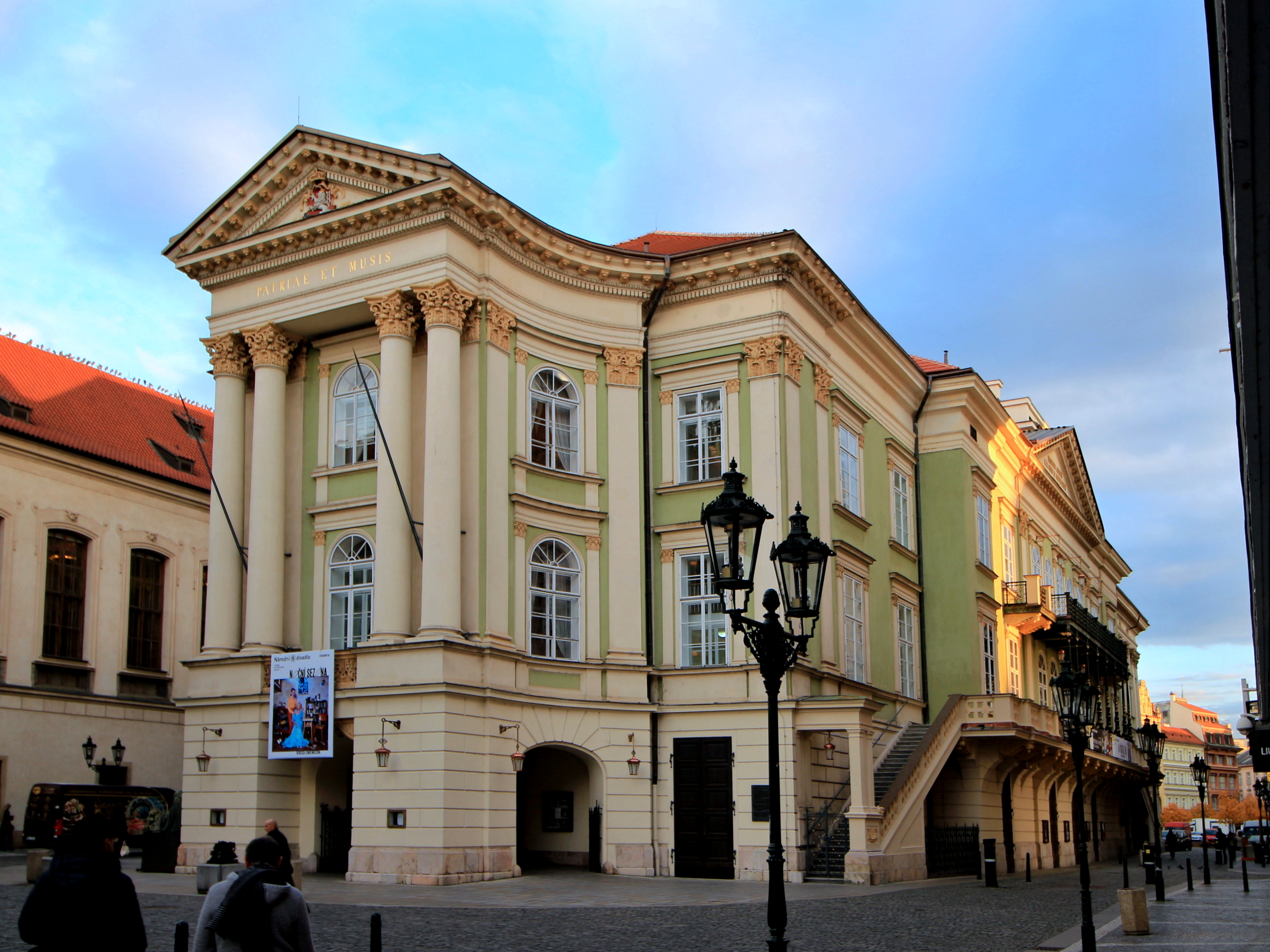
The Estates Theatre in Prague (Czech Republic) is the only theatre left standing where Mozart performed.

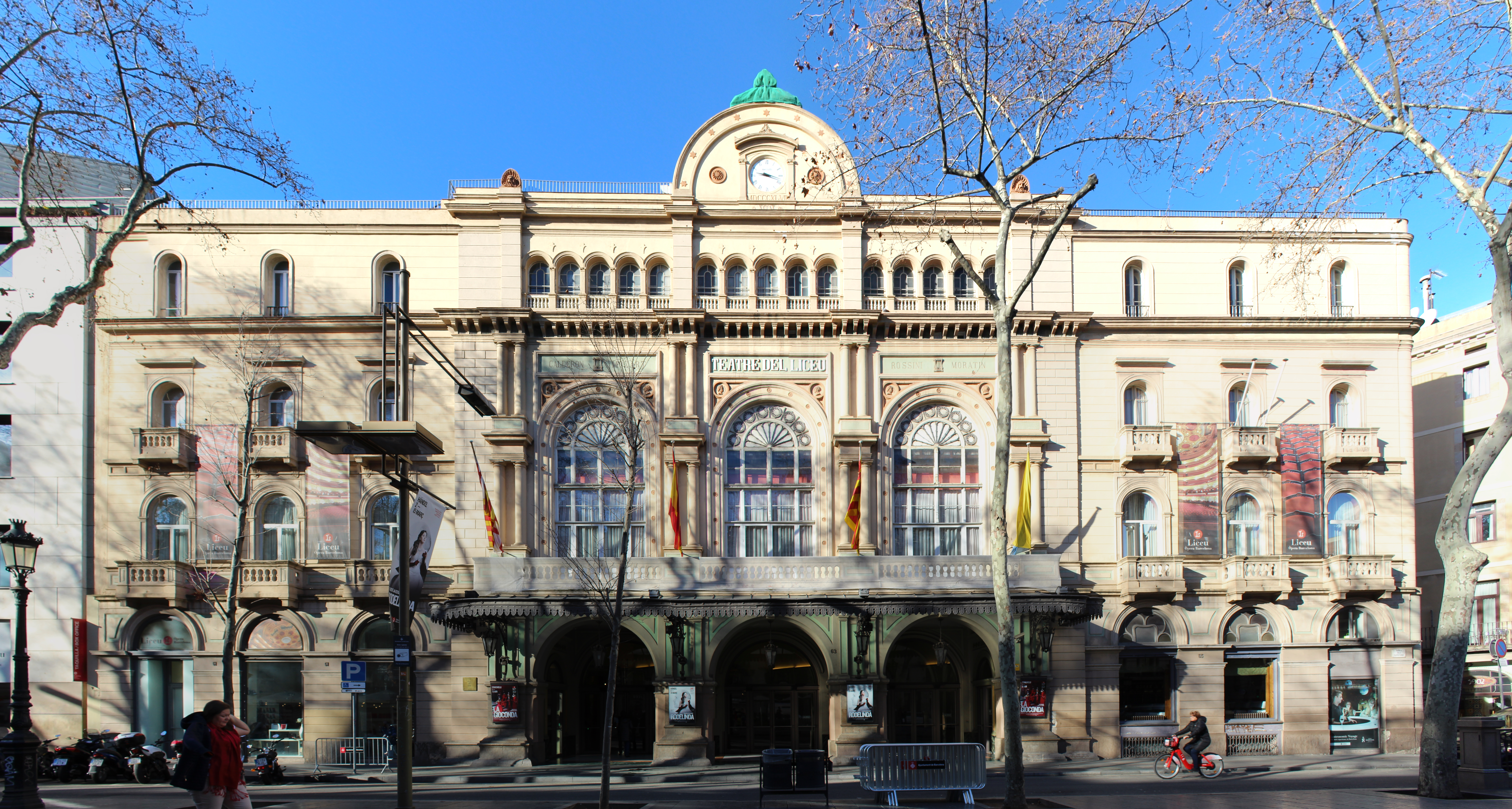
Between 1847 and 1989, the Liceu in Barcelona (Spain) was the largest opera house in Europe by capacity, with its 2,338 seats at the time.

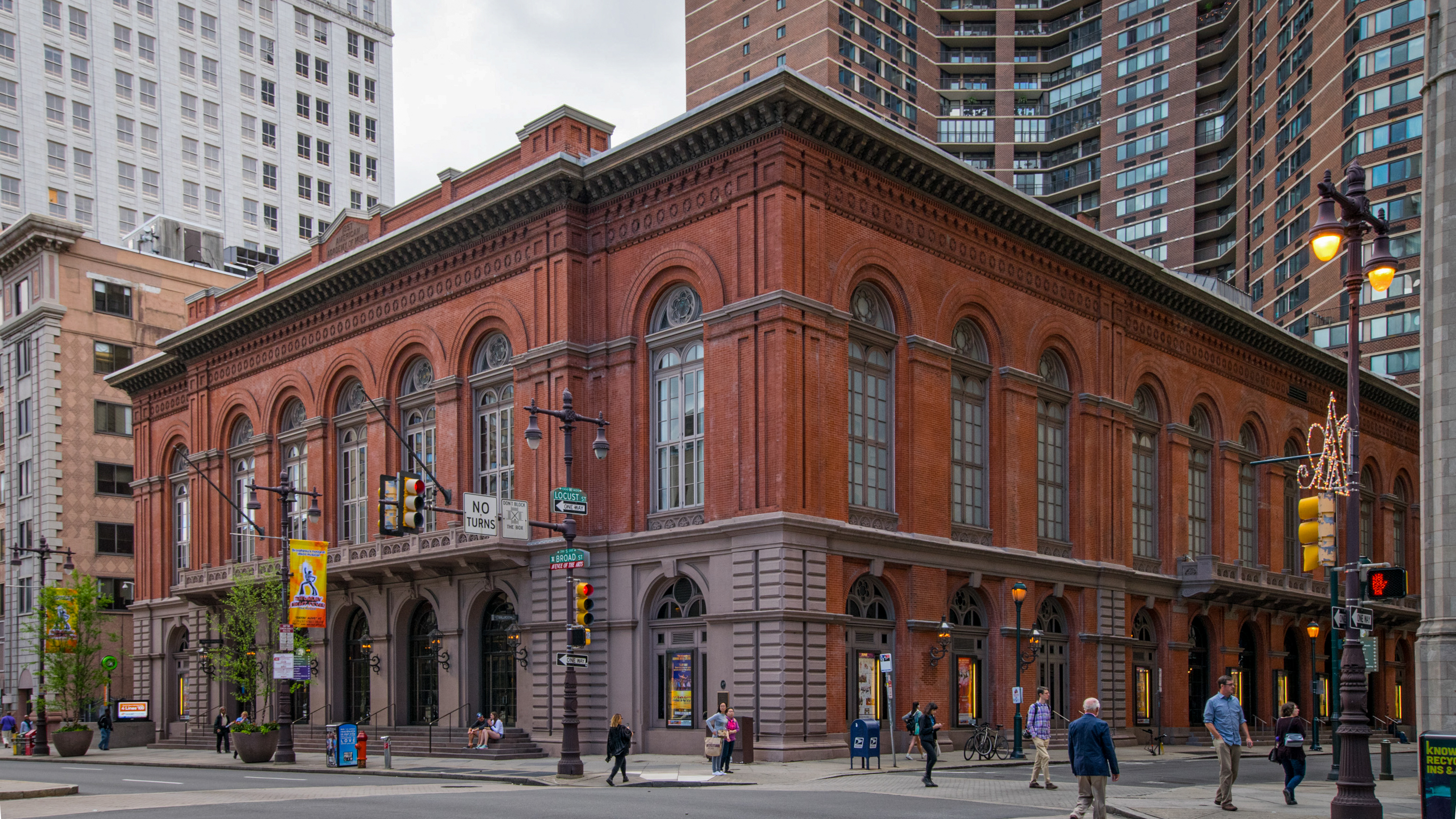
The Academy of Music in Philadelphia is the oldest opera house in the USA.

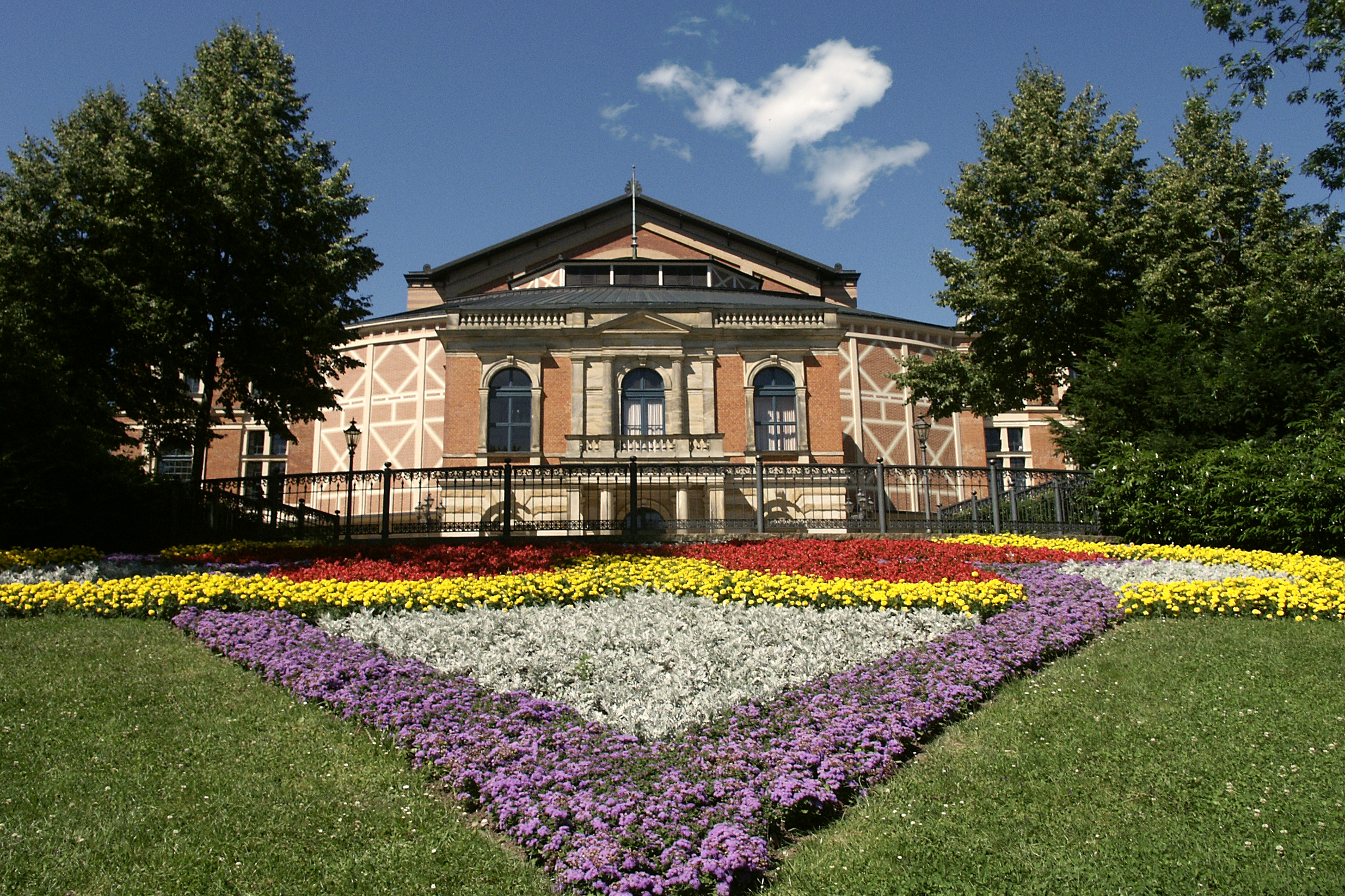
The Bayreuth Festspielhaus in Bayreuth (Germany) was built by Richard Wagner and dedicated solely to the performance of his stage works.

== Other uses of the term ==
In the 19th-century United States, many theaters were given the name "opera house", even ones where opera was seldom if ever performed. Opera was viewed as a more respectable art form than theater; calling a local theater an "opera house" therefore served to elevate it and overcome objections from those who found the theater morally objectionable.

== Gallery ==
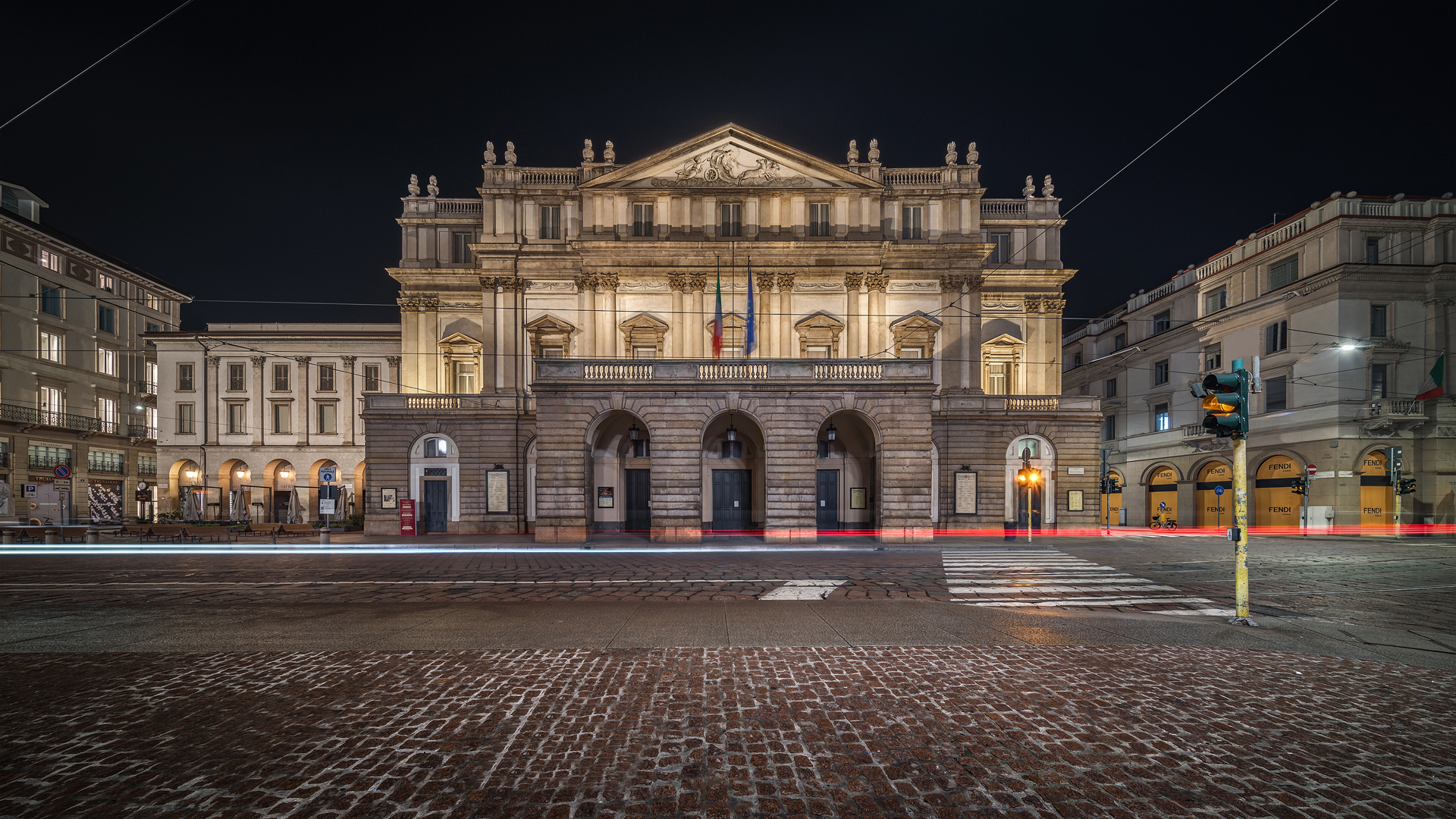
Teatro alla Scala in Milan, Italy

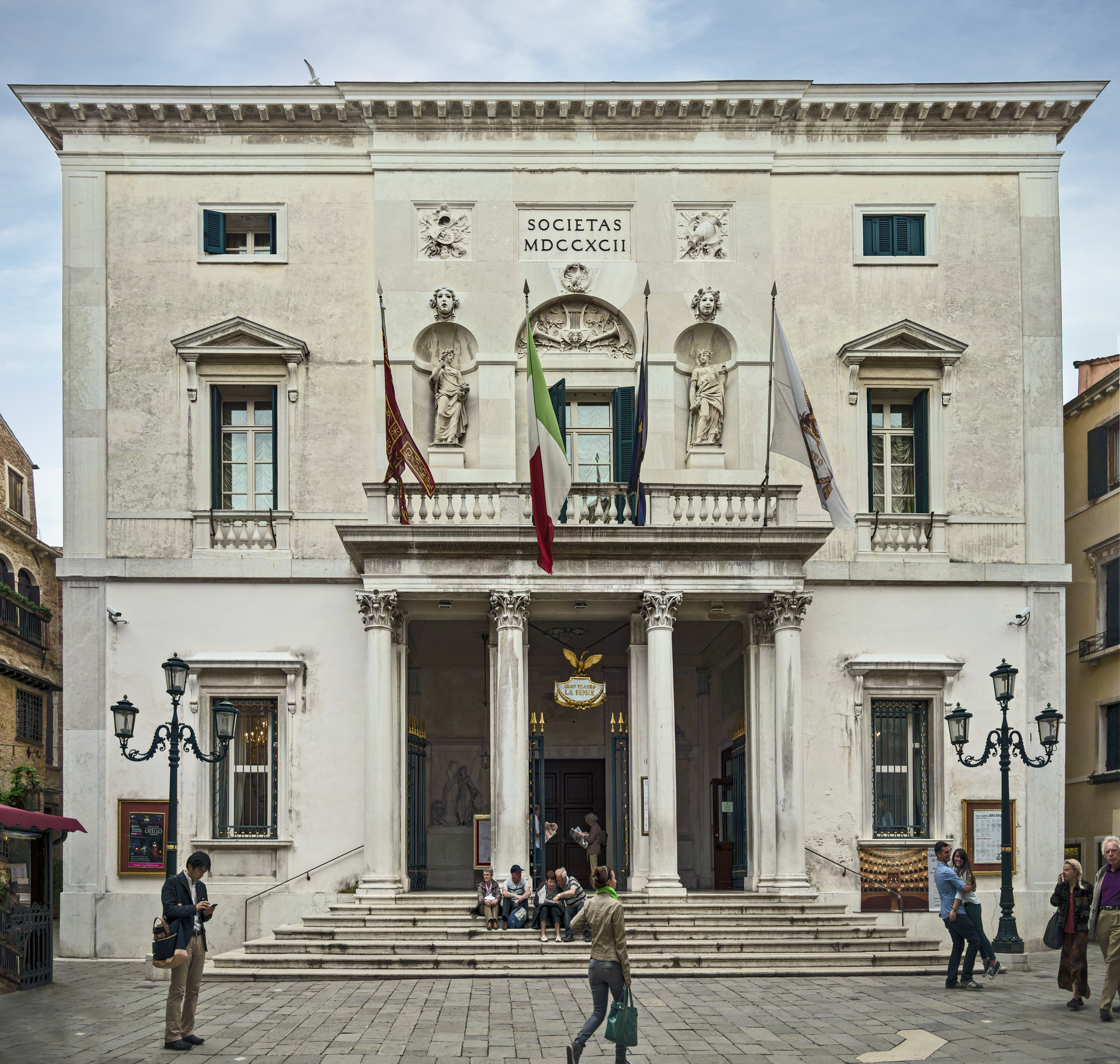
La Fenice in Venice, Italy

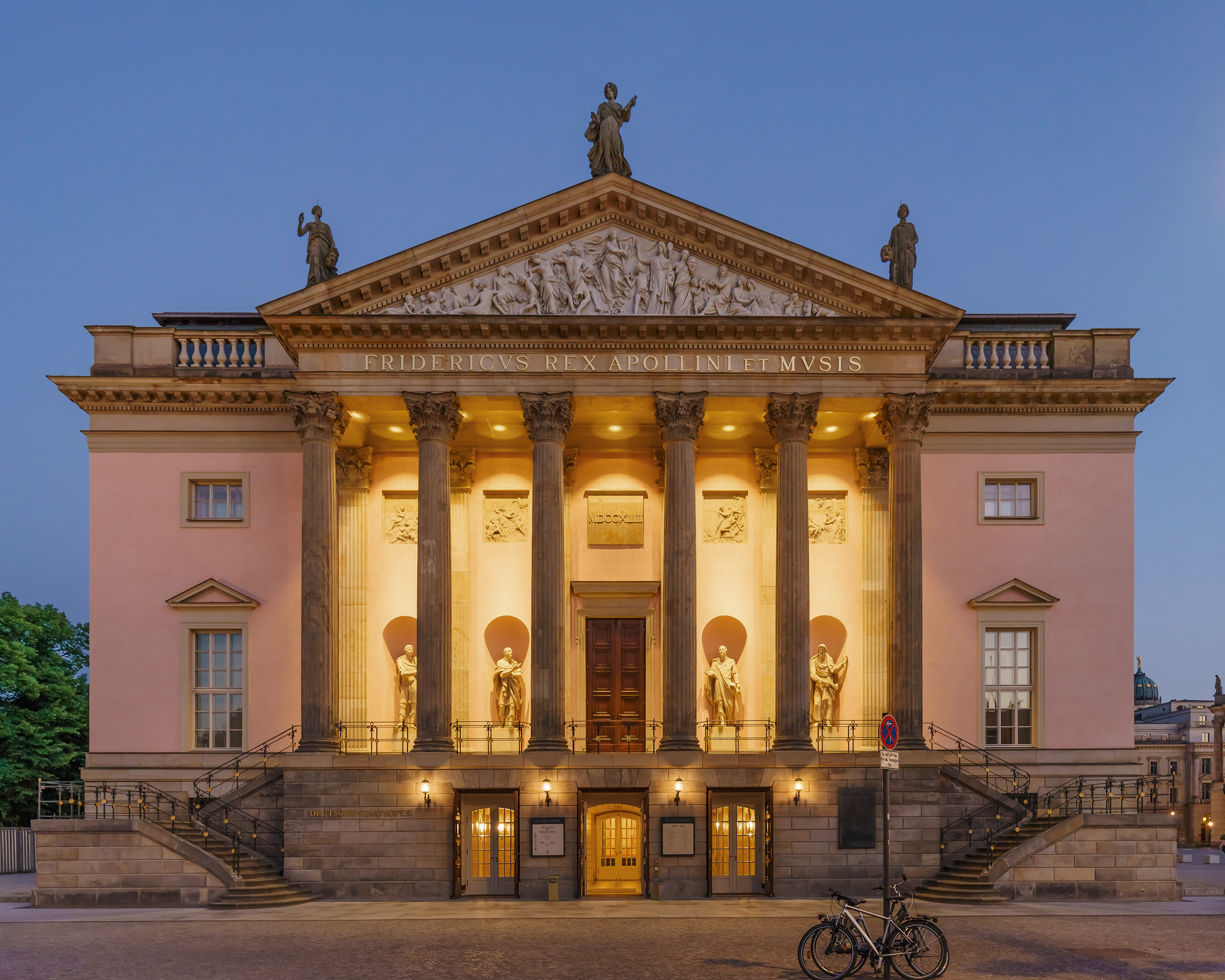
Berlin State Opera on Unter den Linden, Germany

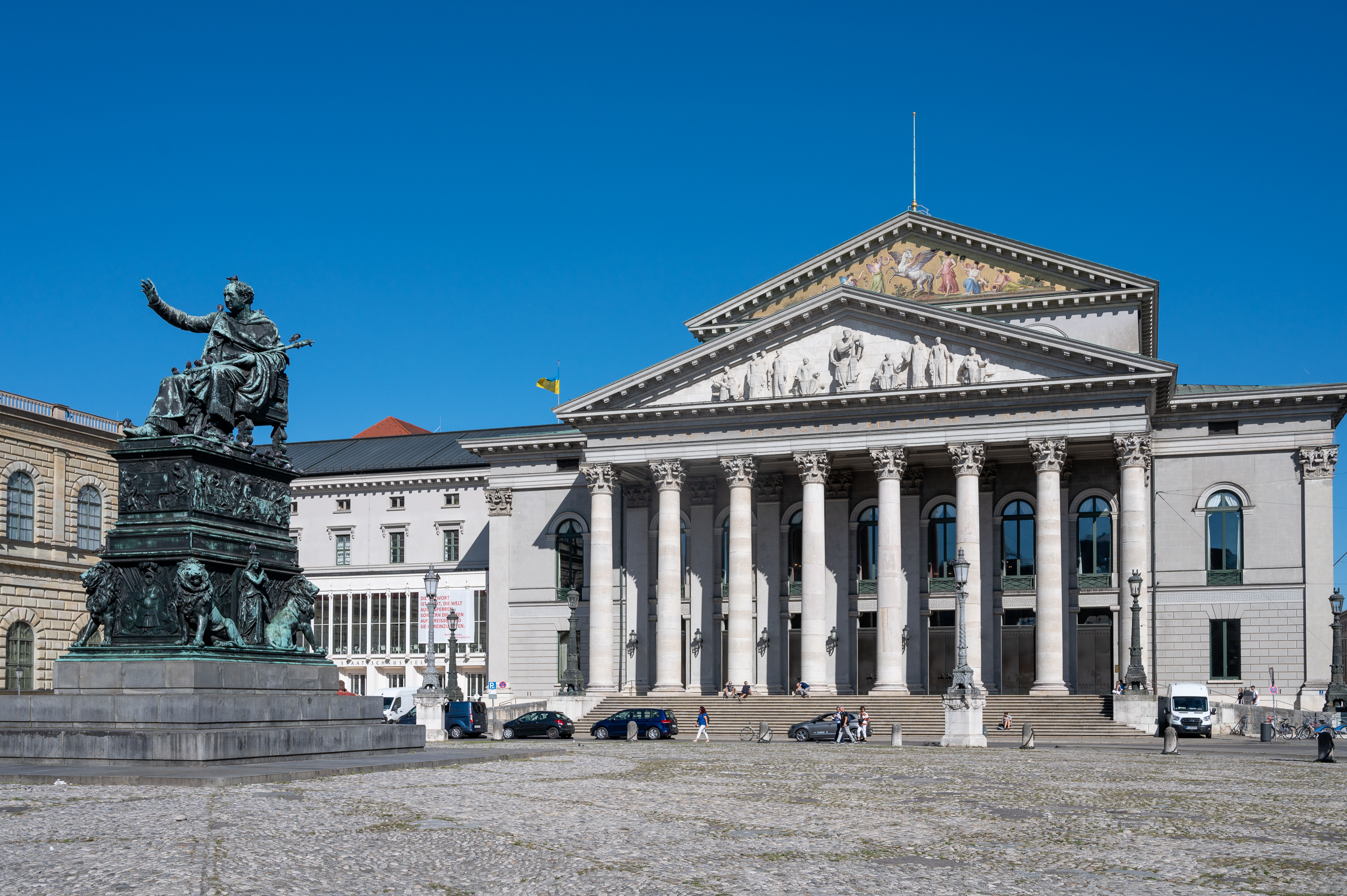
National Theatre in Munich, Germany; home to the Bavarian State Opera

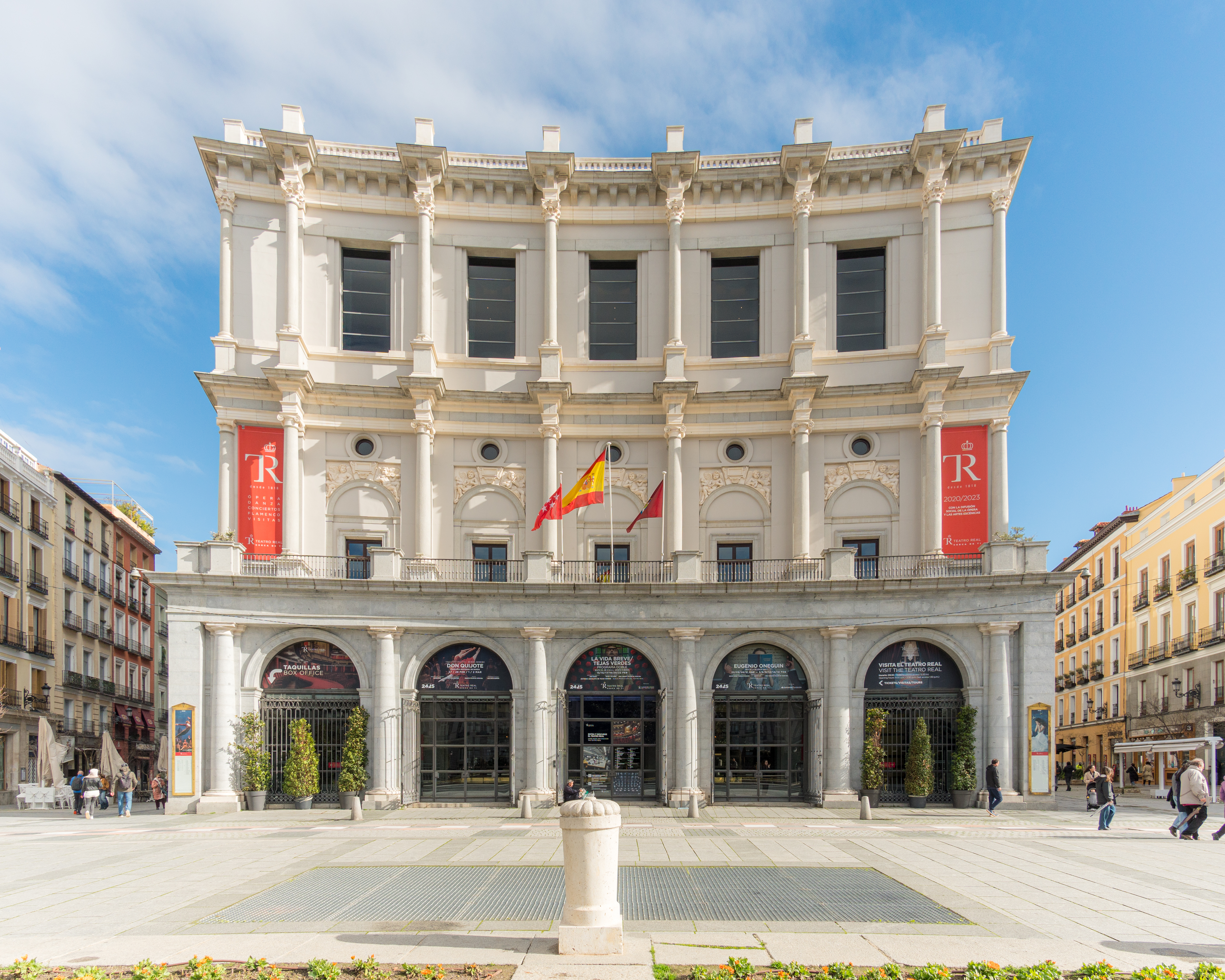
Teatro Real in Madrid, Spain

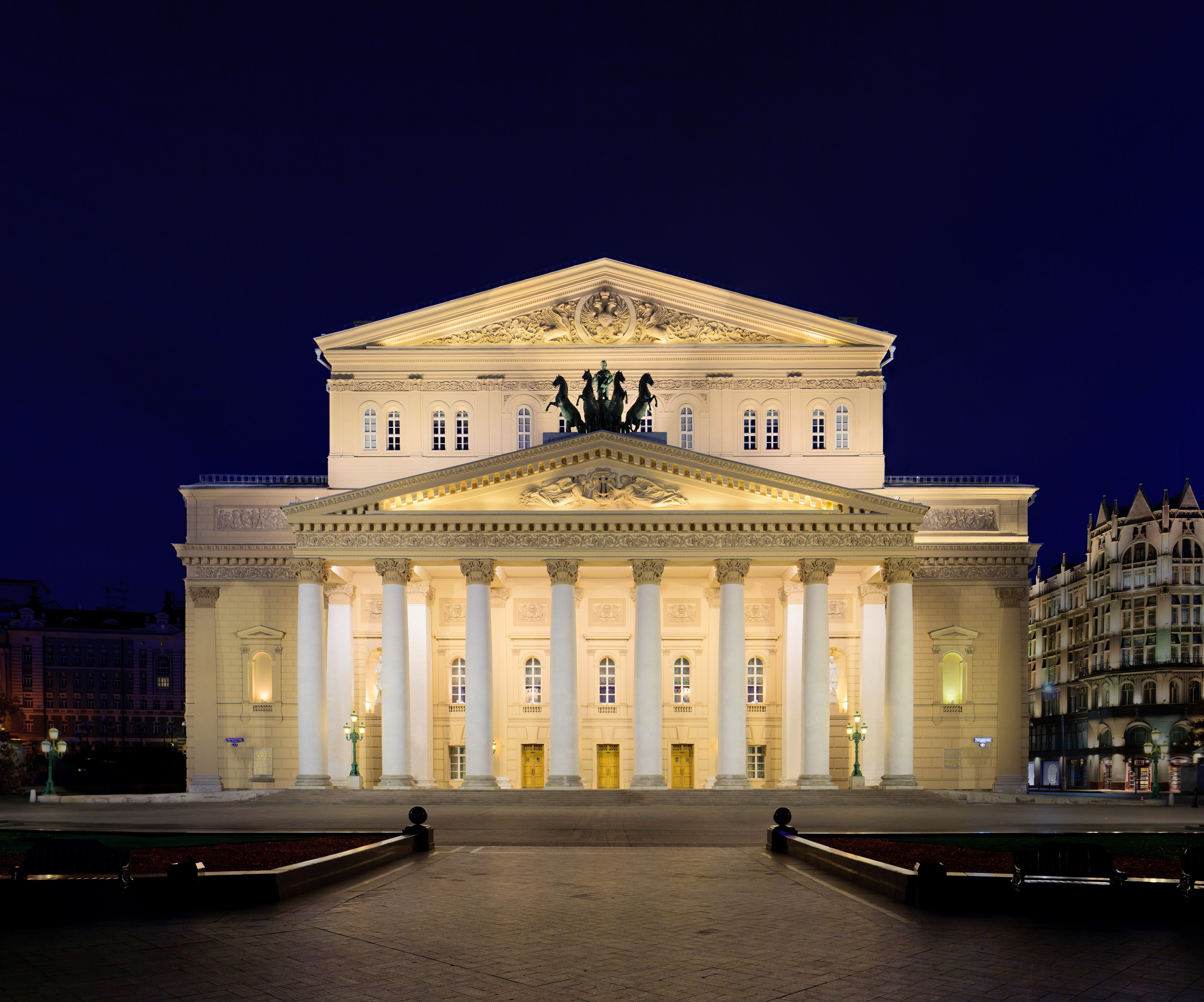
Bolshoi Theatre in Moscow, Russia; home to the Bolshoi Ballet

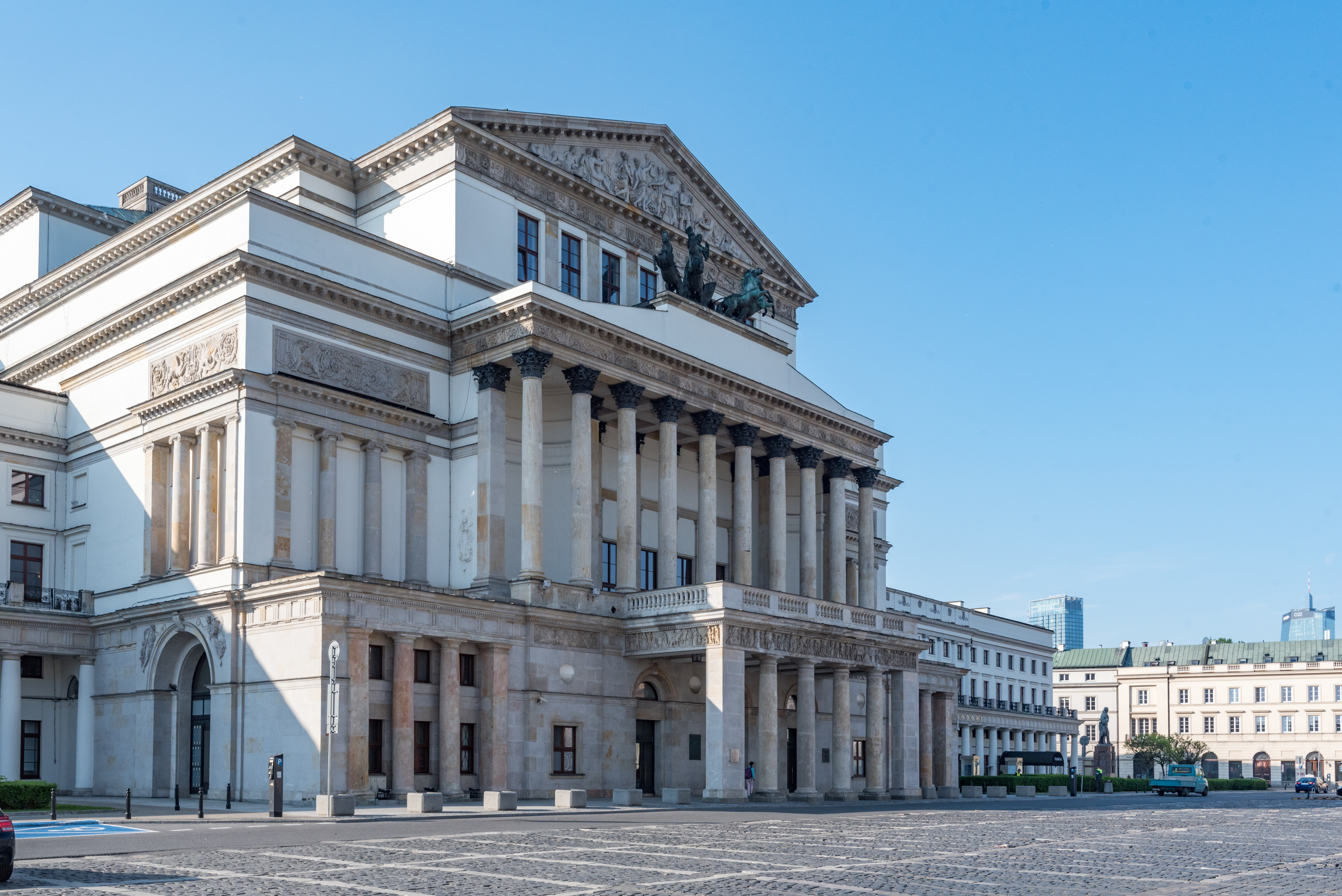
Grand Theatre in Warsaw, Poland

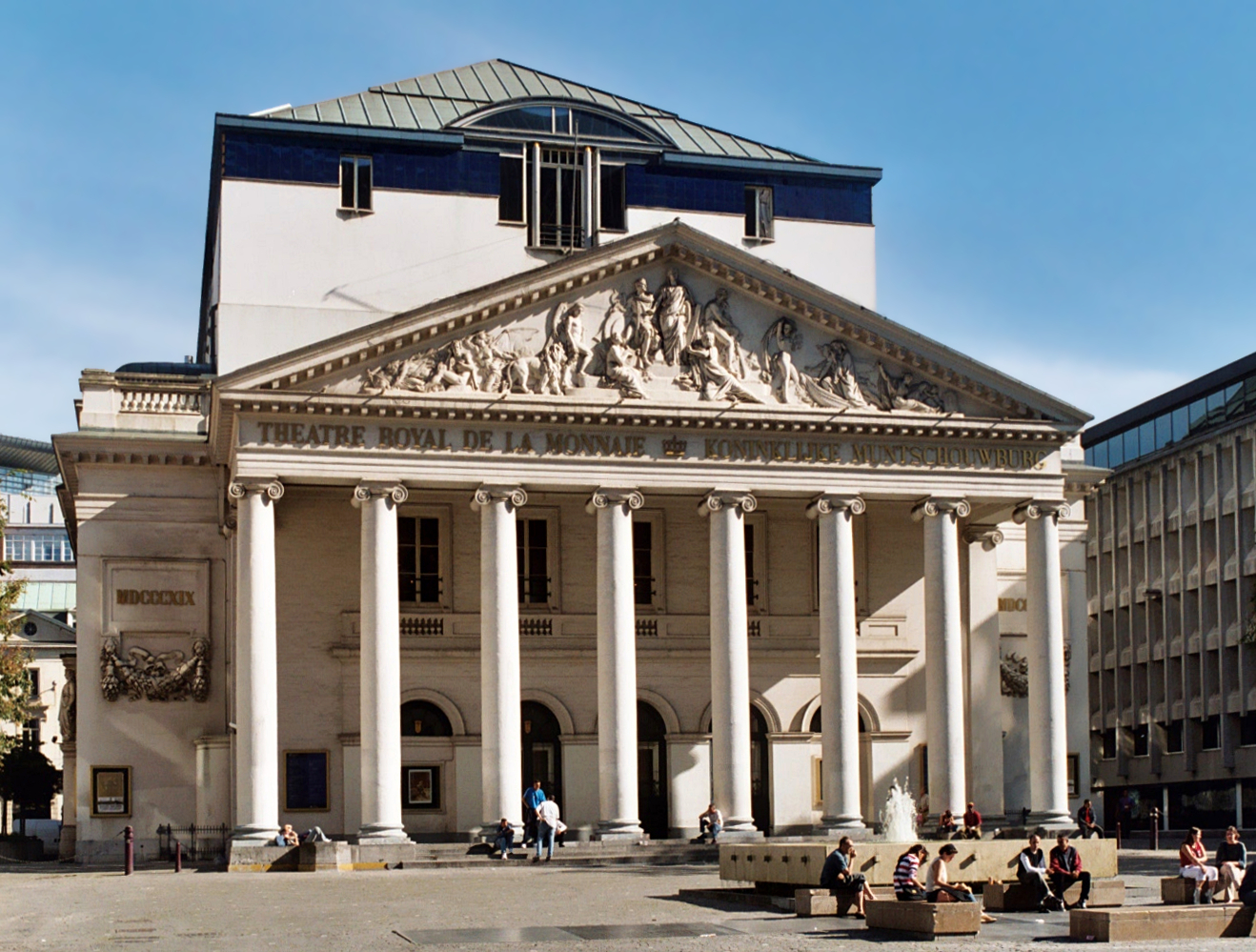
Royal Theatre of La Monnaie in Brussels, Belgium

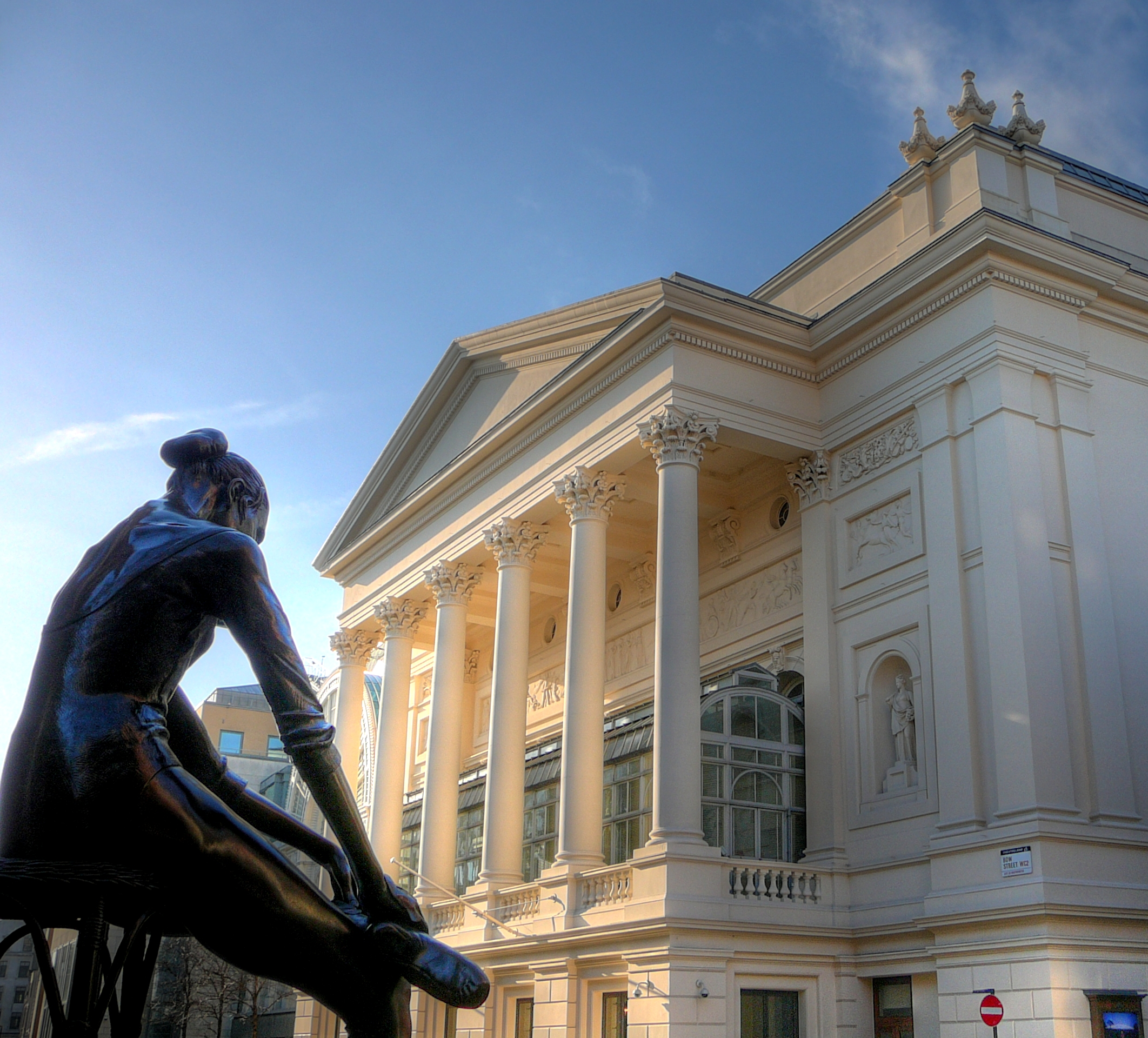
Royal Opera House in London, UK

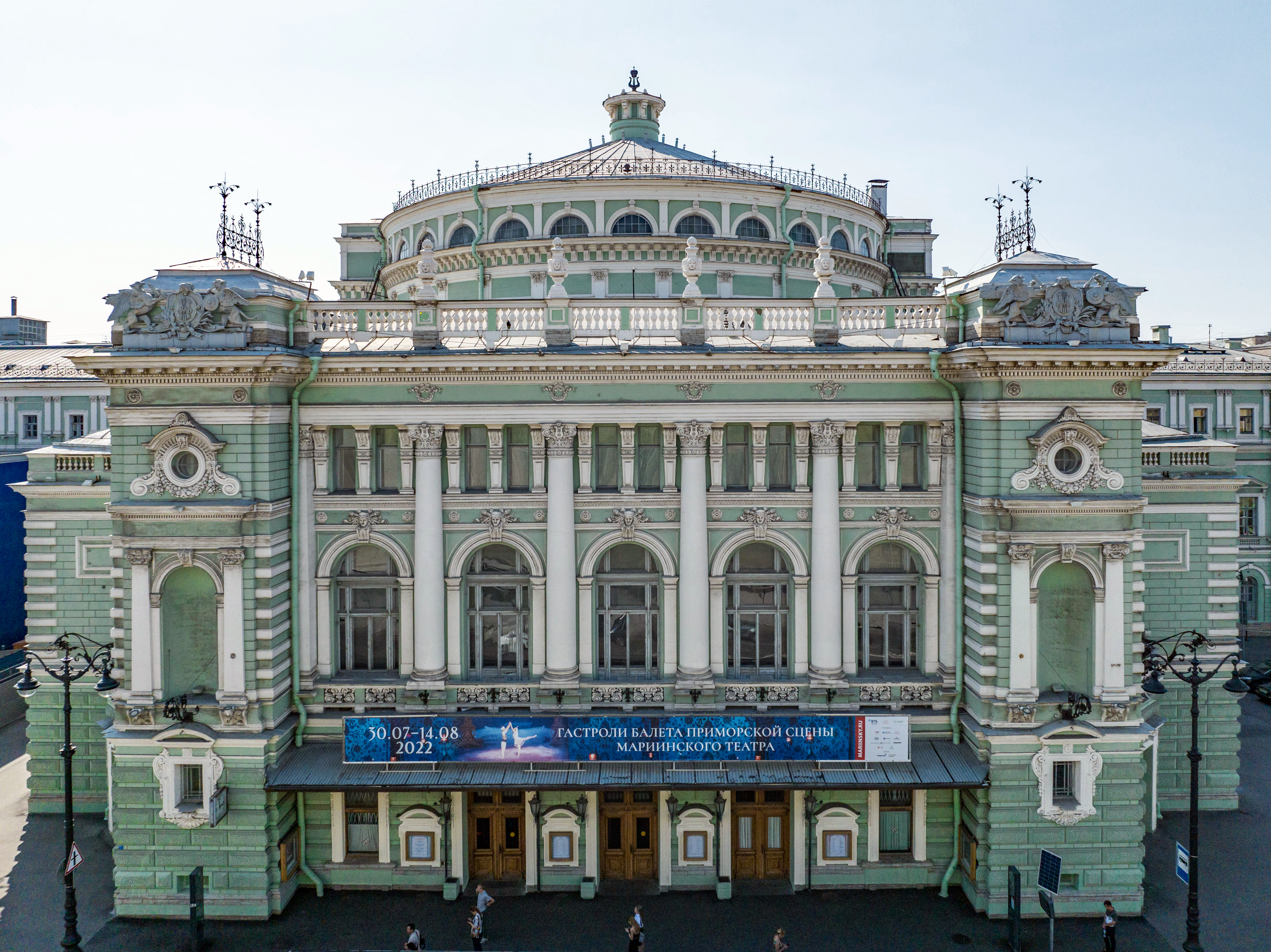
Mariinsky Theatre in Saint Petersburg, Russia

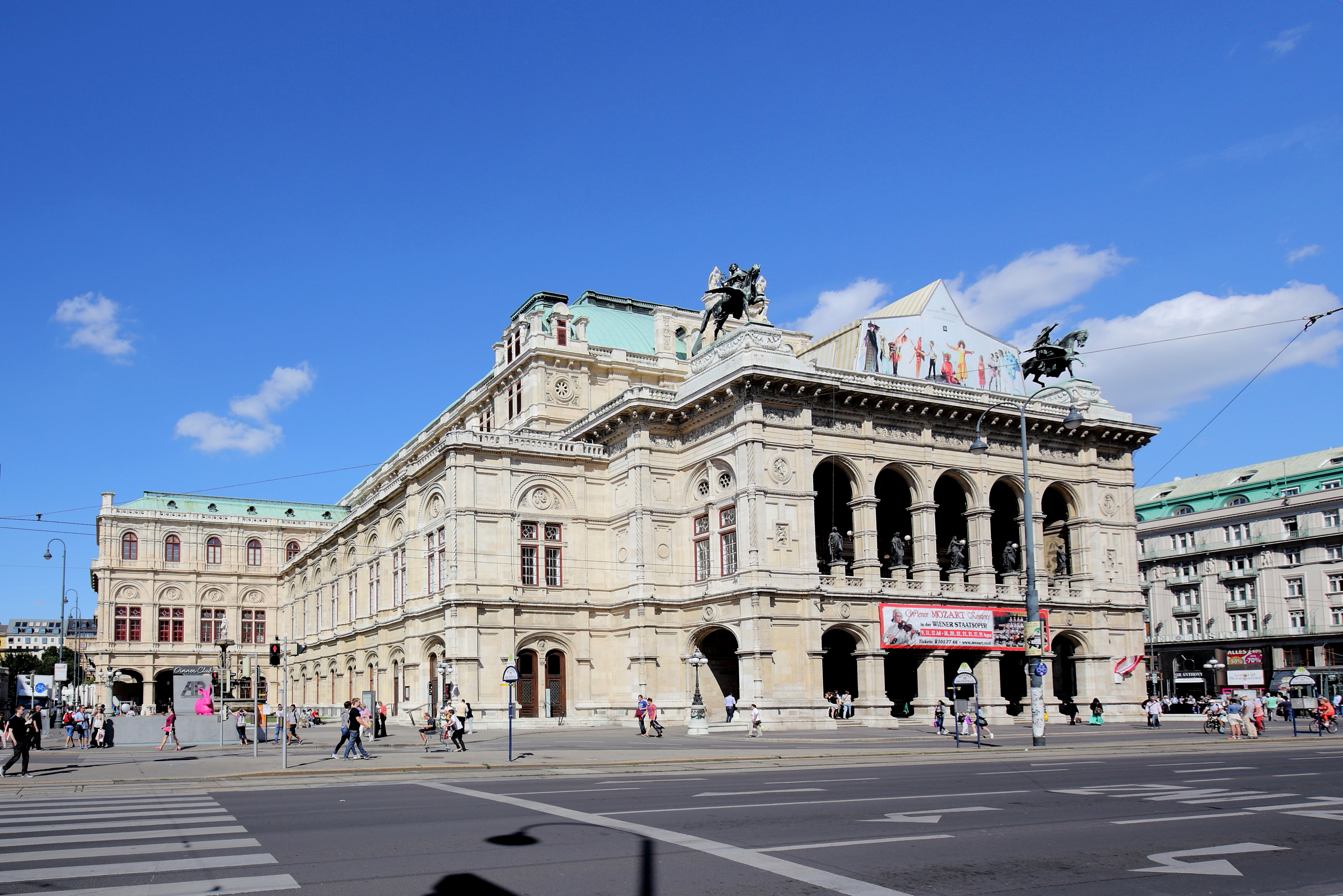
Vienna State Opera in Austria

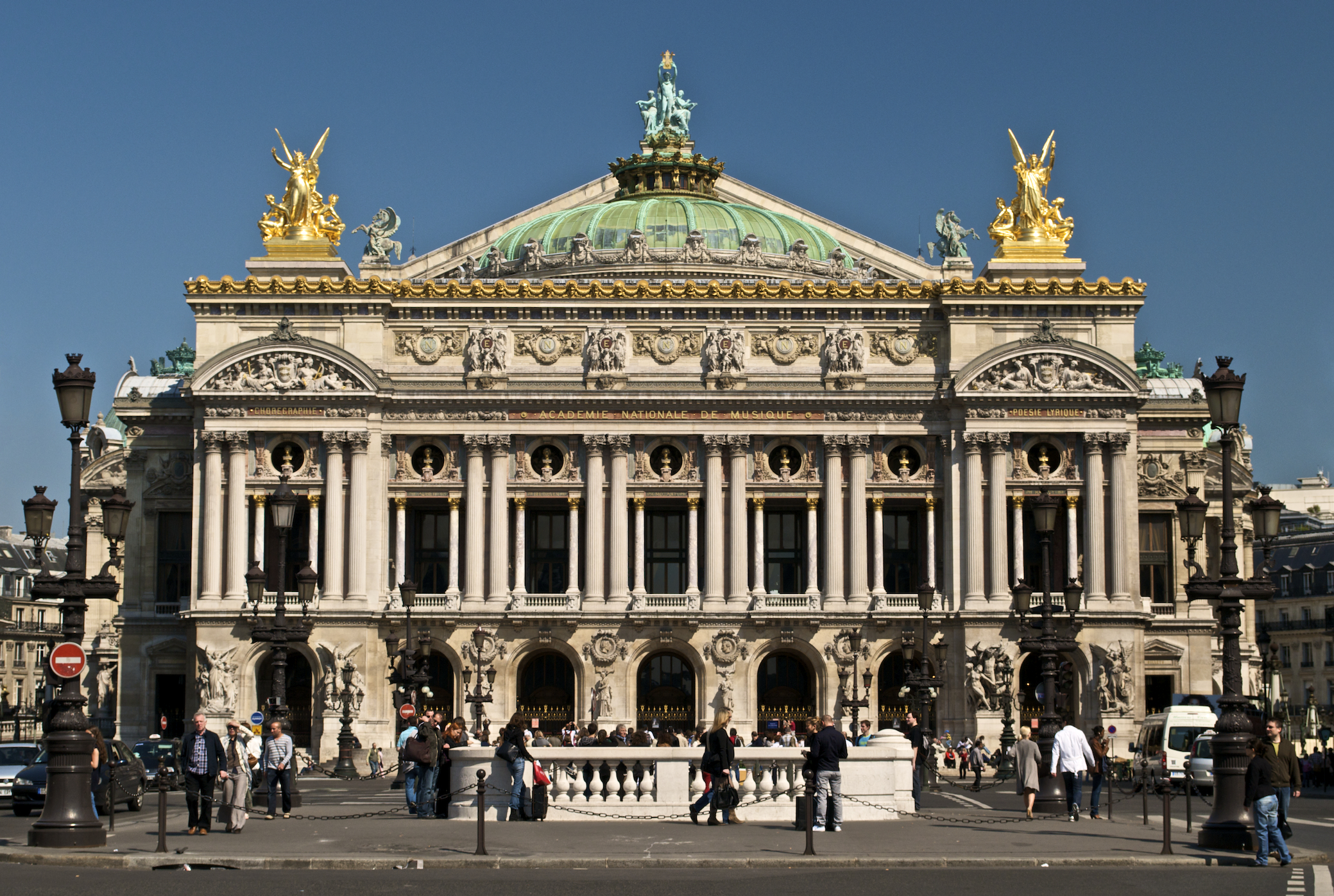
Palais Garnier in Paris, France

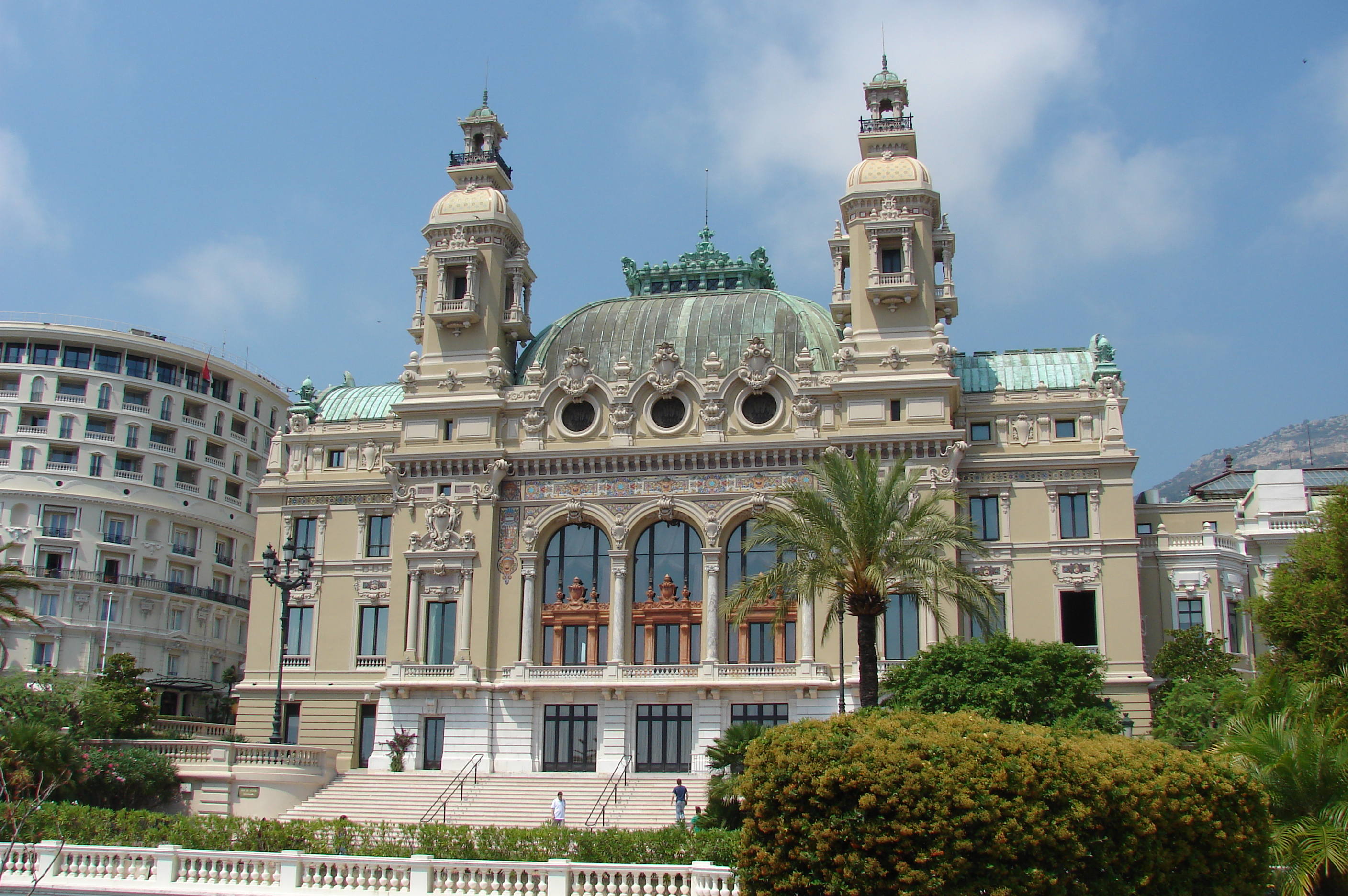
Opéra de Monte-Carlo in Monaco

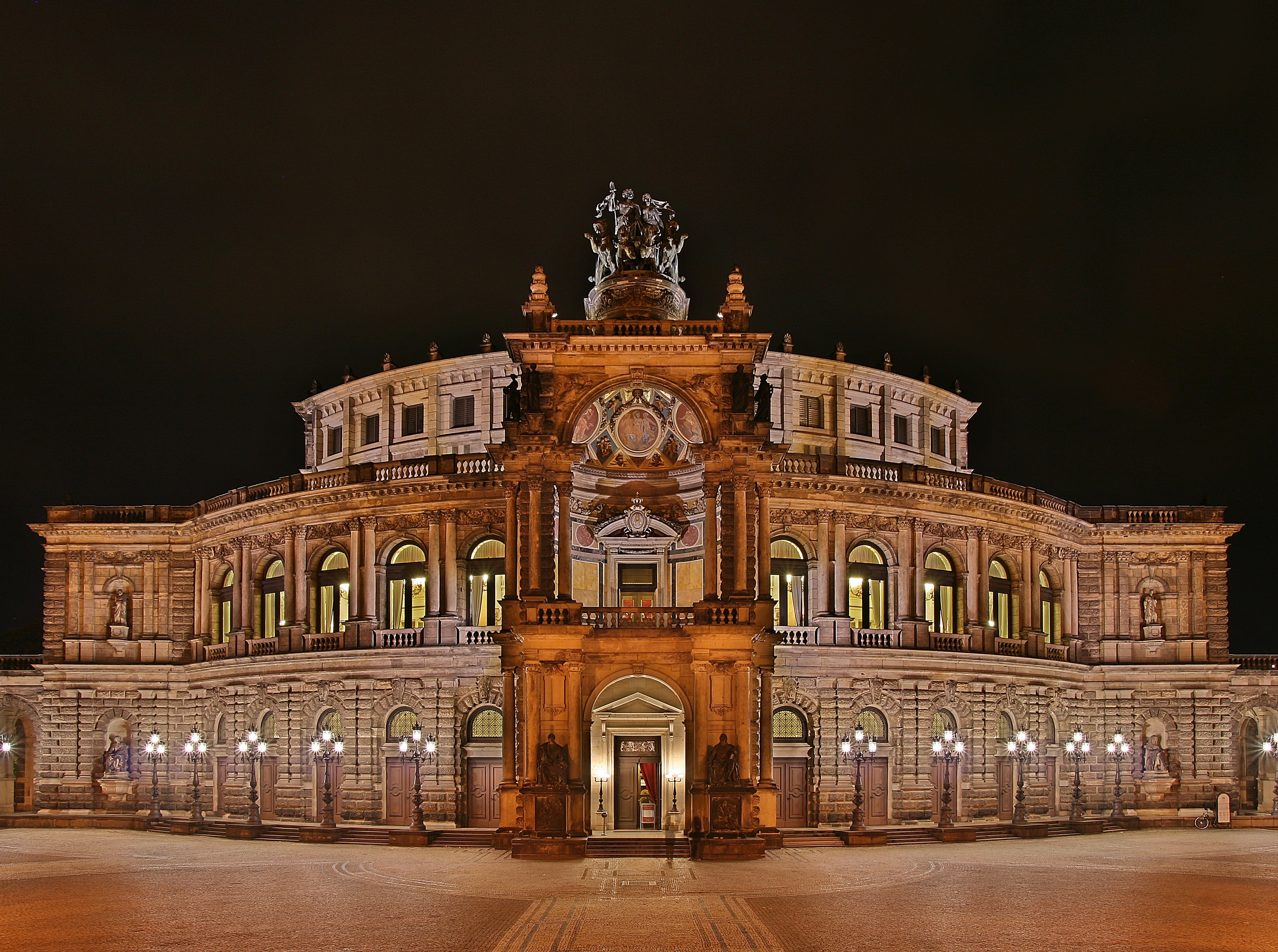
Semperoper in Dresden, Germany

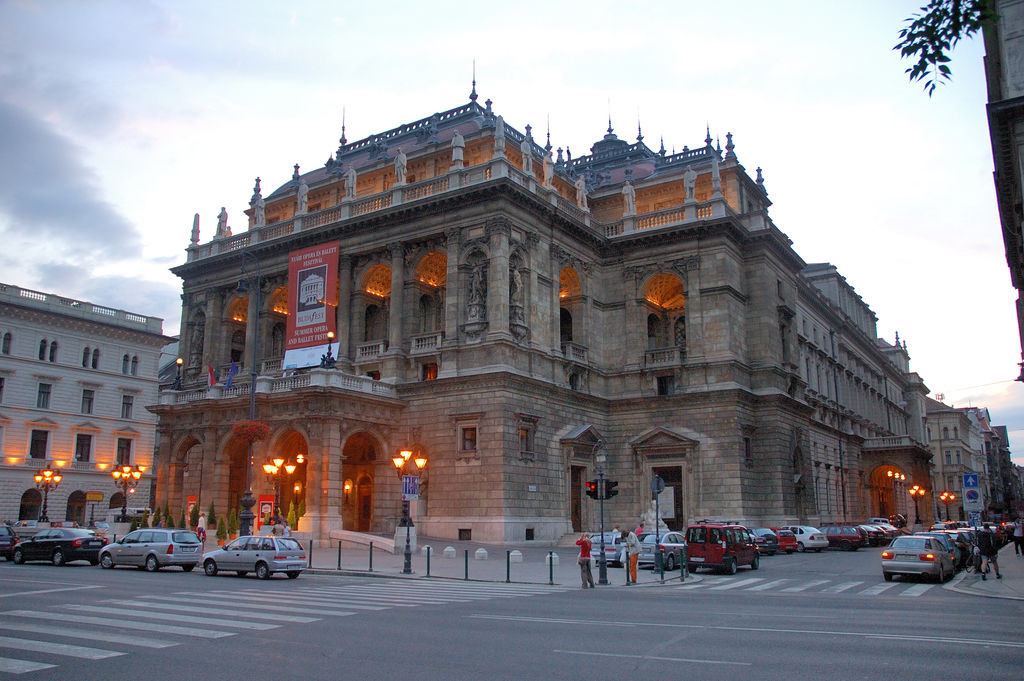
Hungarian State Opera House in Budapest, Hungary

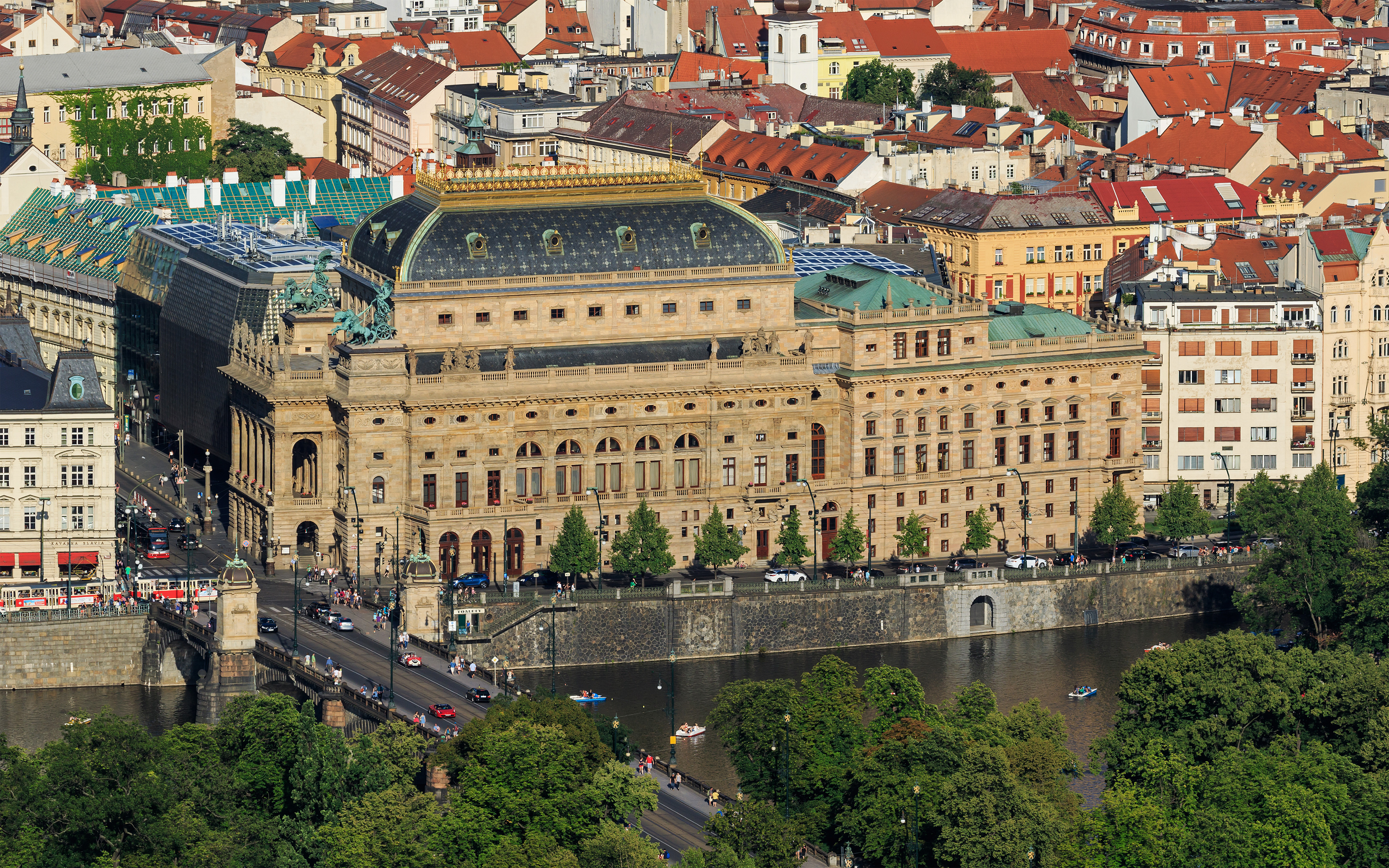
National Theatre in Prague, Czech Republic

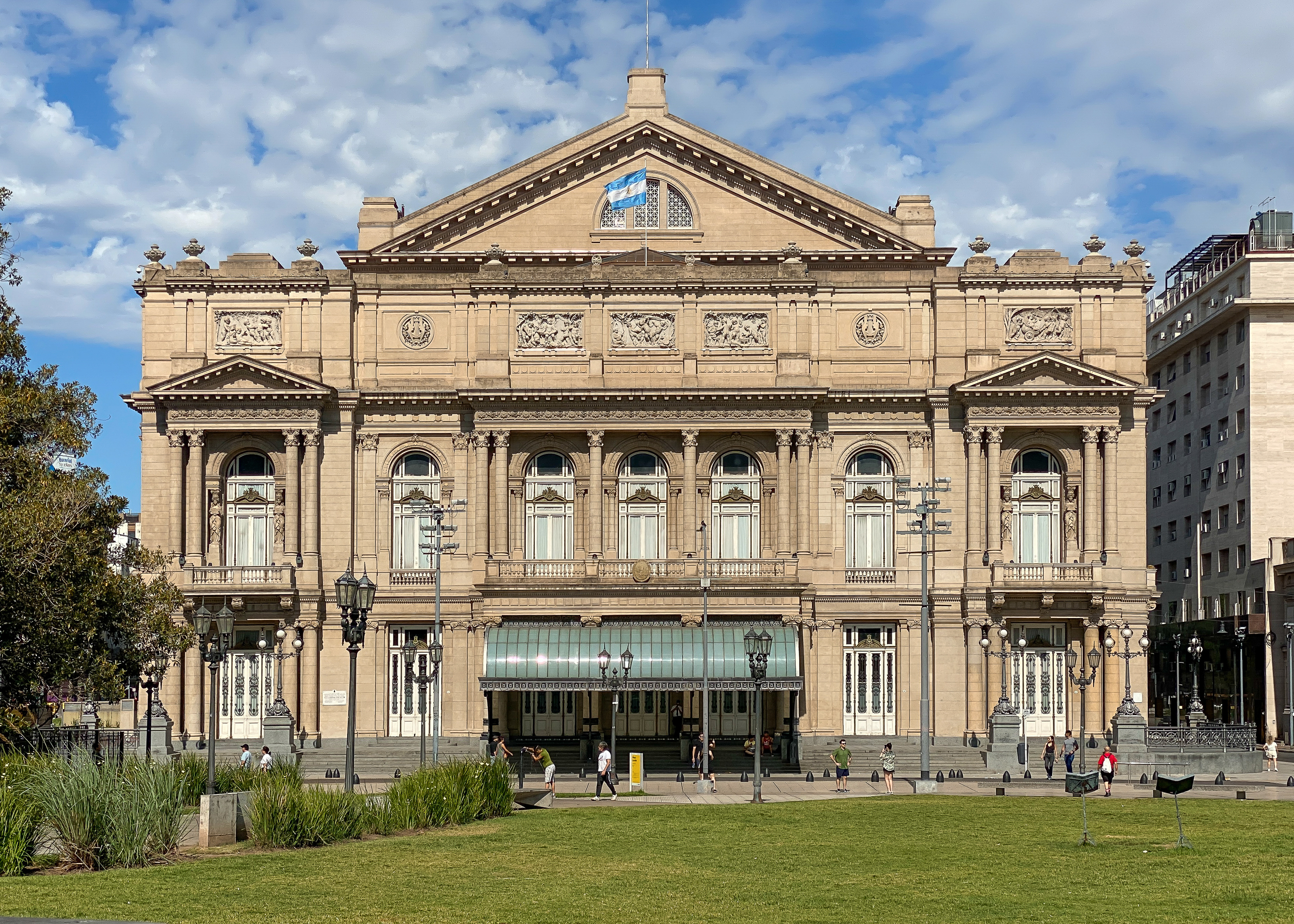
Teatro Colón in Buenos Aires, Argentina

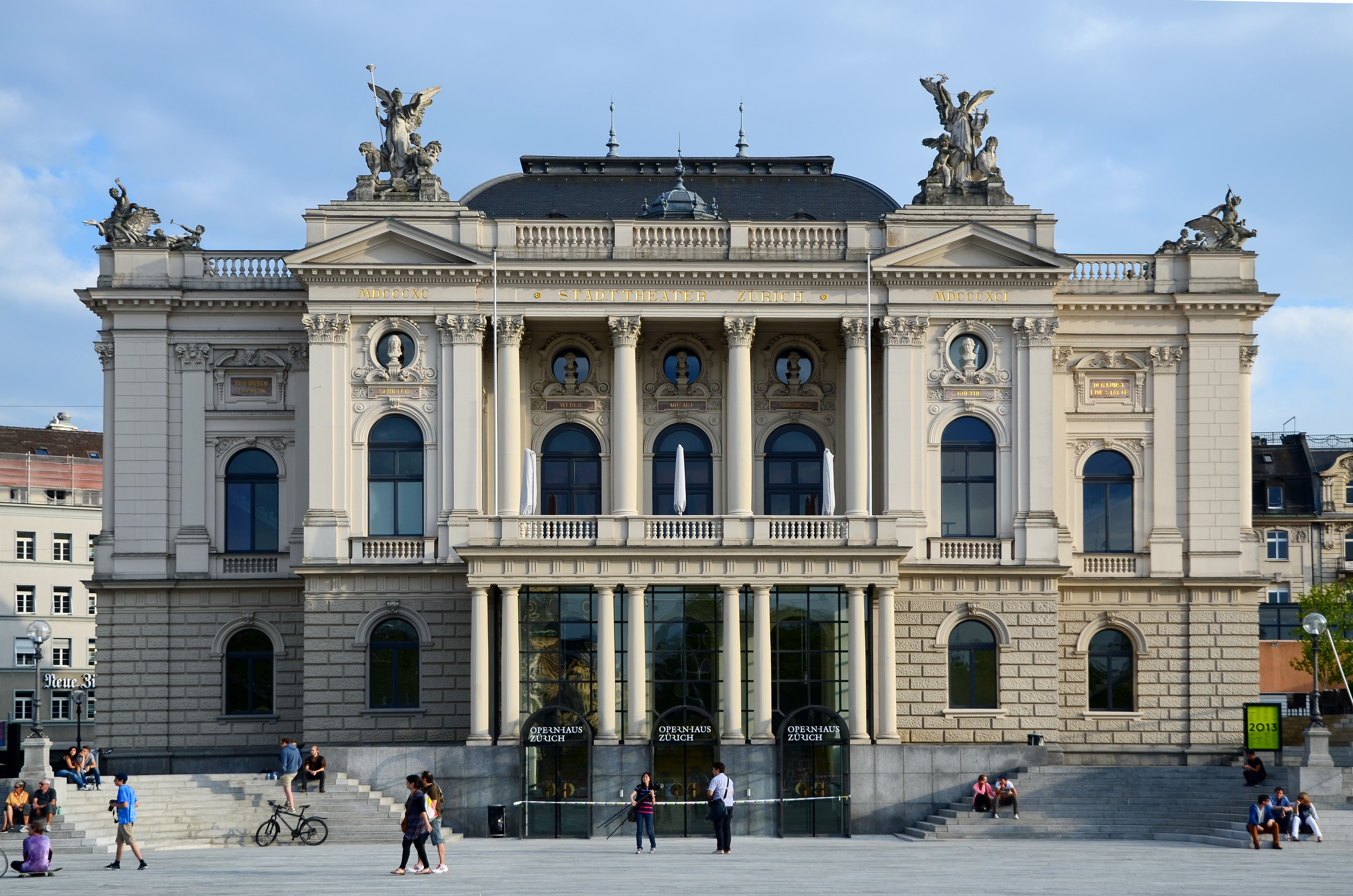
Zürich Opera House in Zürich, Switzerland

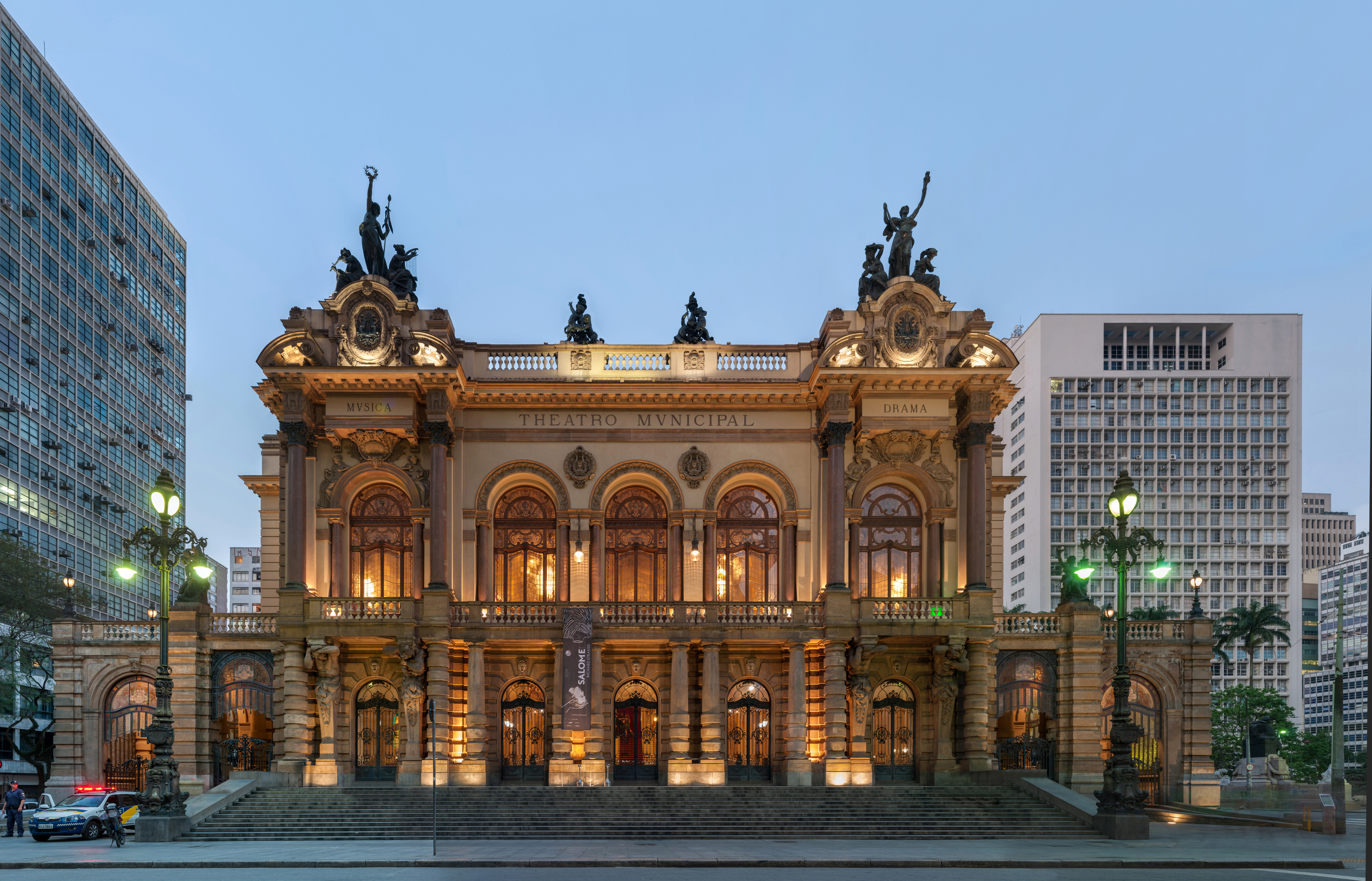
Theatro Municipal in São Paulo, Brazil

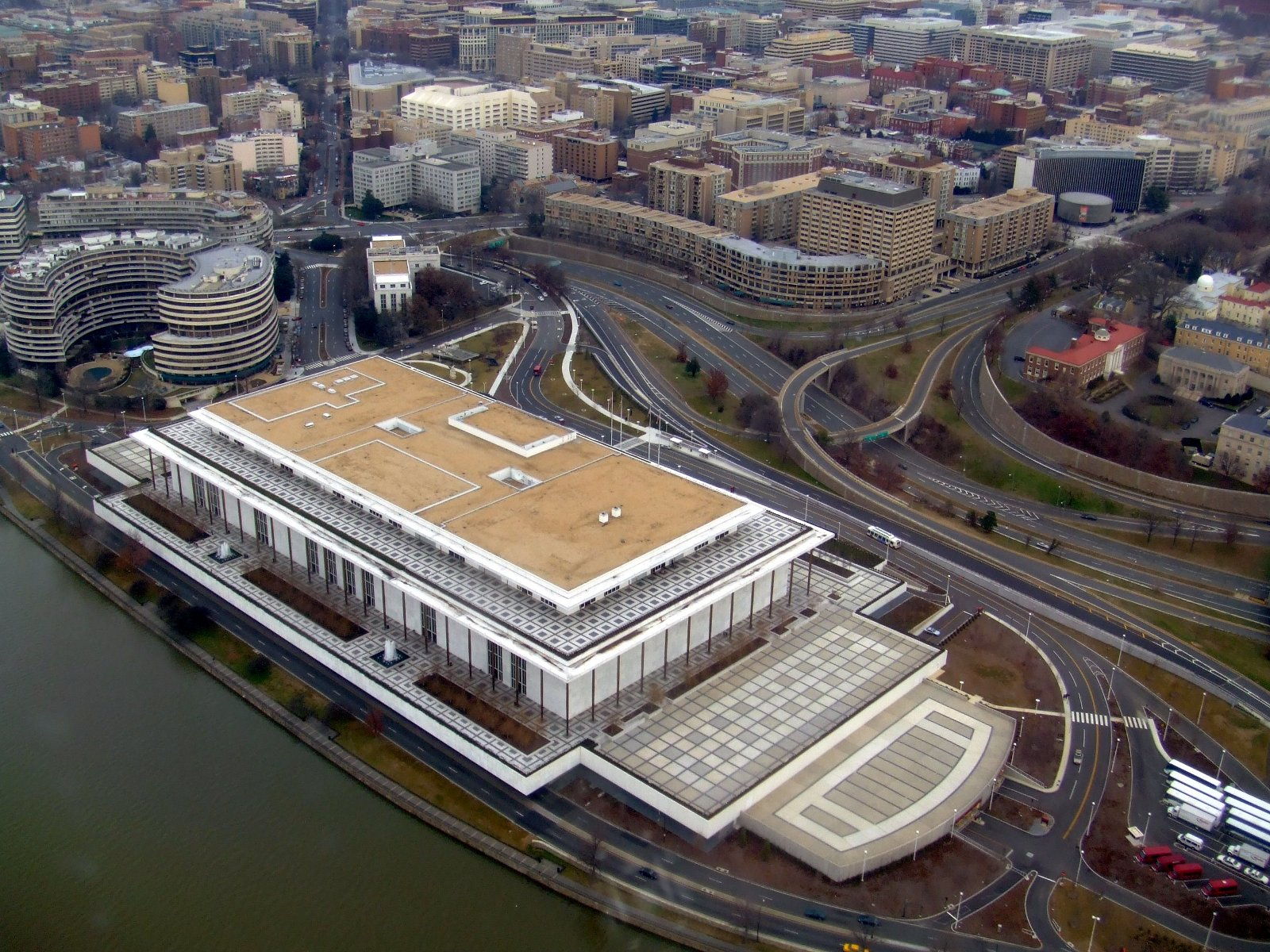
Kennedy Center Opera House in Washington, D.C., USA

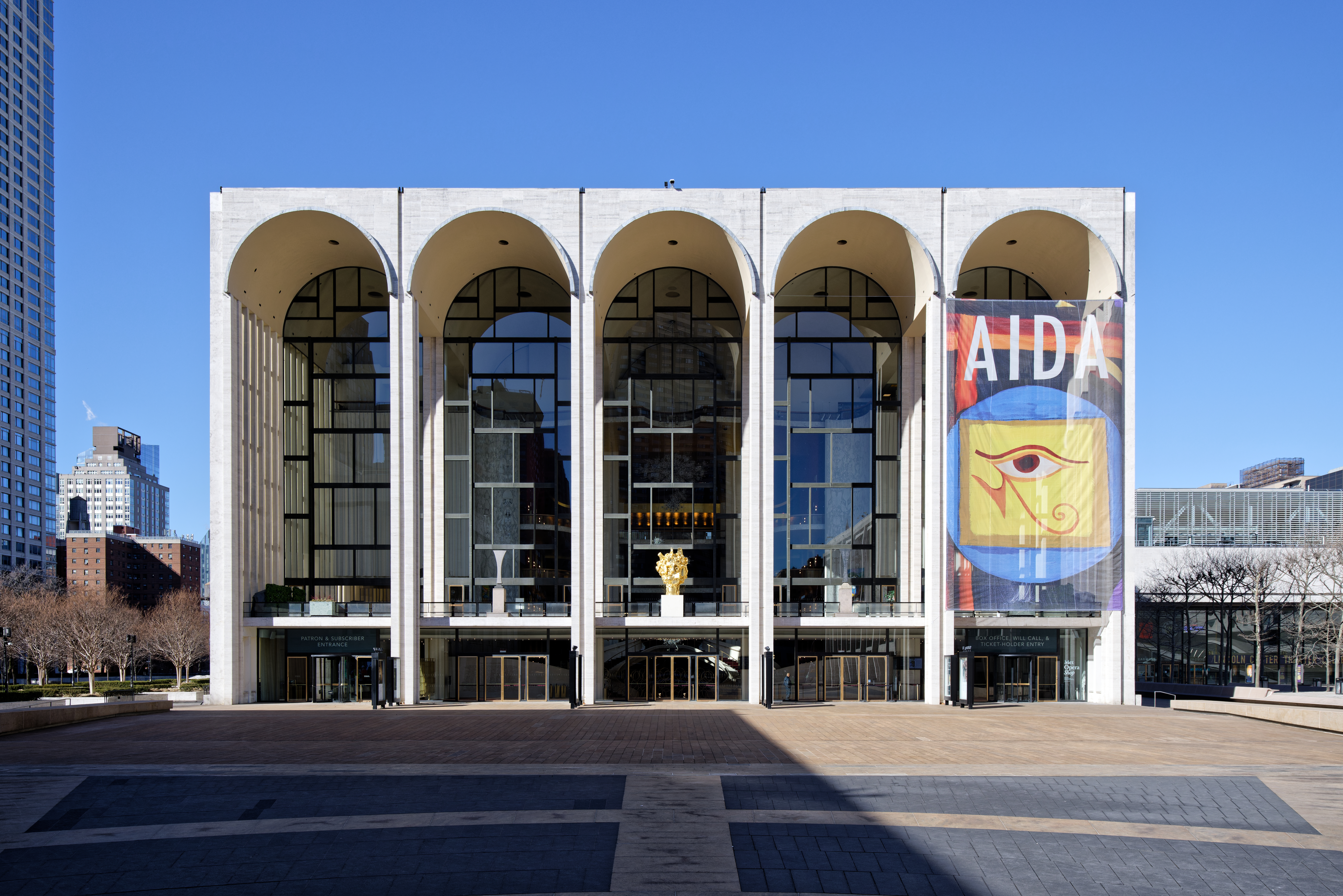
Metropolitan Opera House at Lincoln Center in New York City, USA

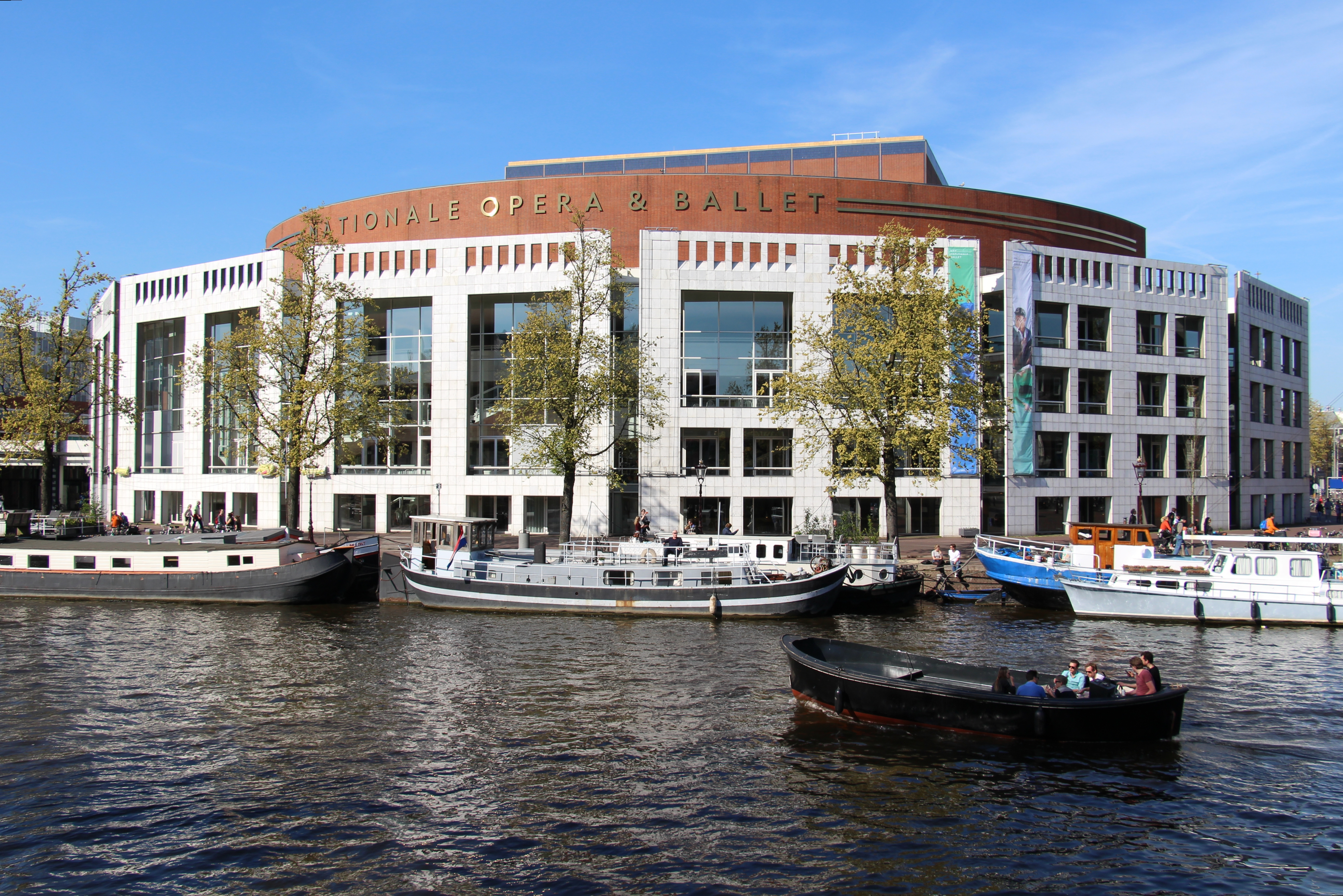
The Dutch National Opera and Ballet in Amsterdam, Netherlands

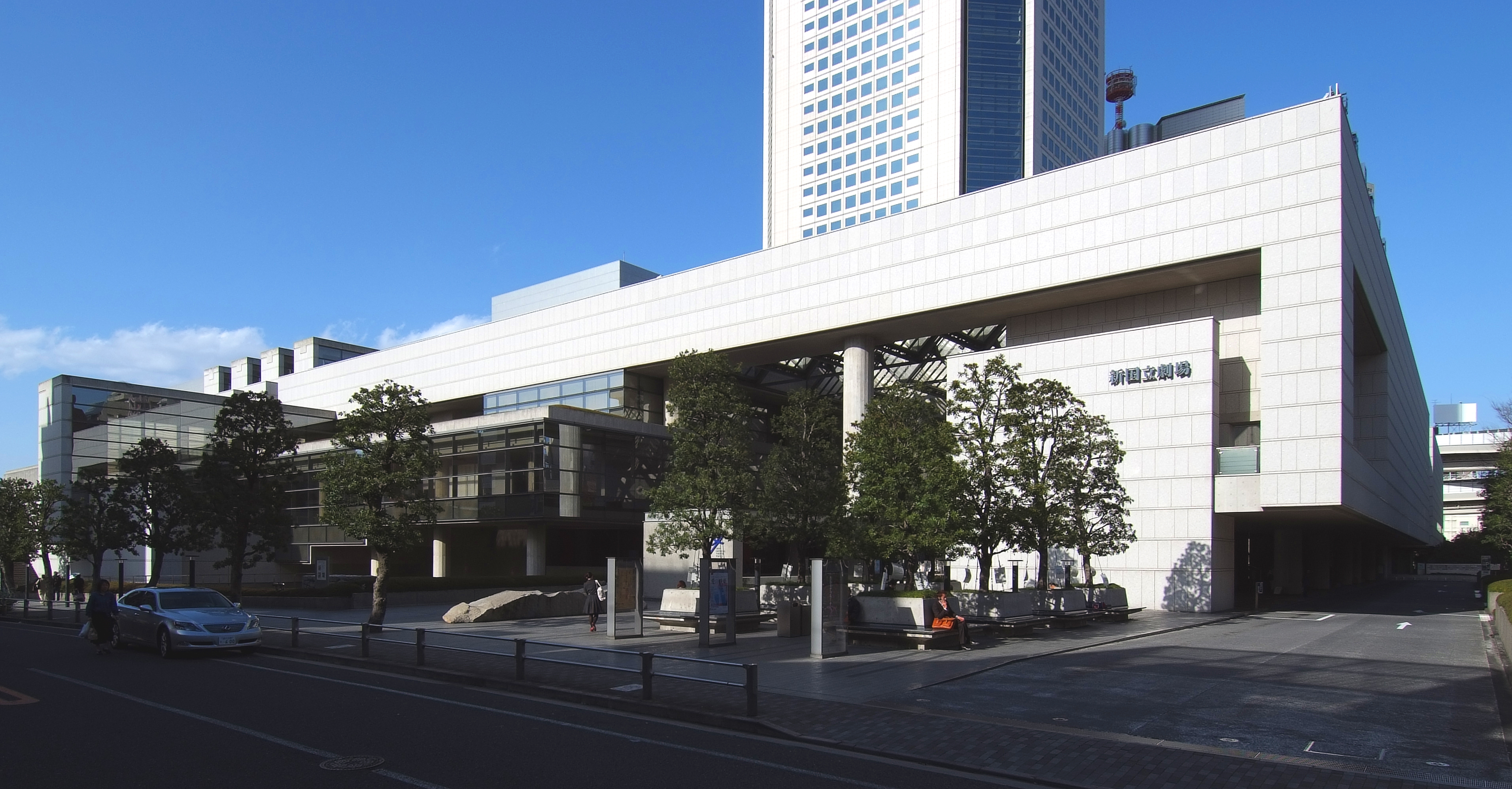
New National Theatre Tokyo in Tokyo, Japan

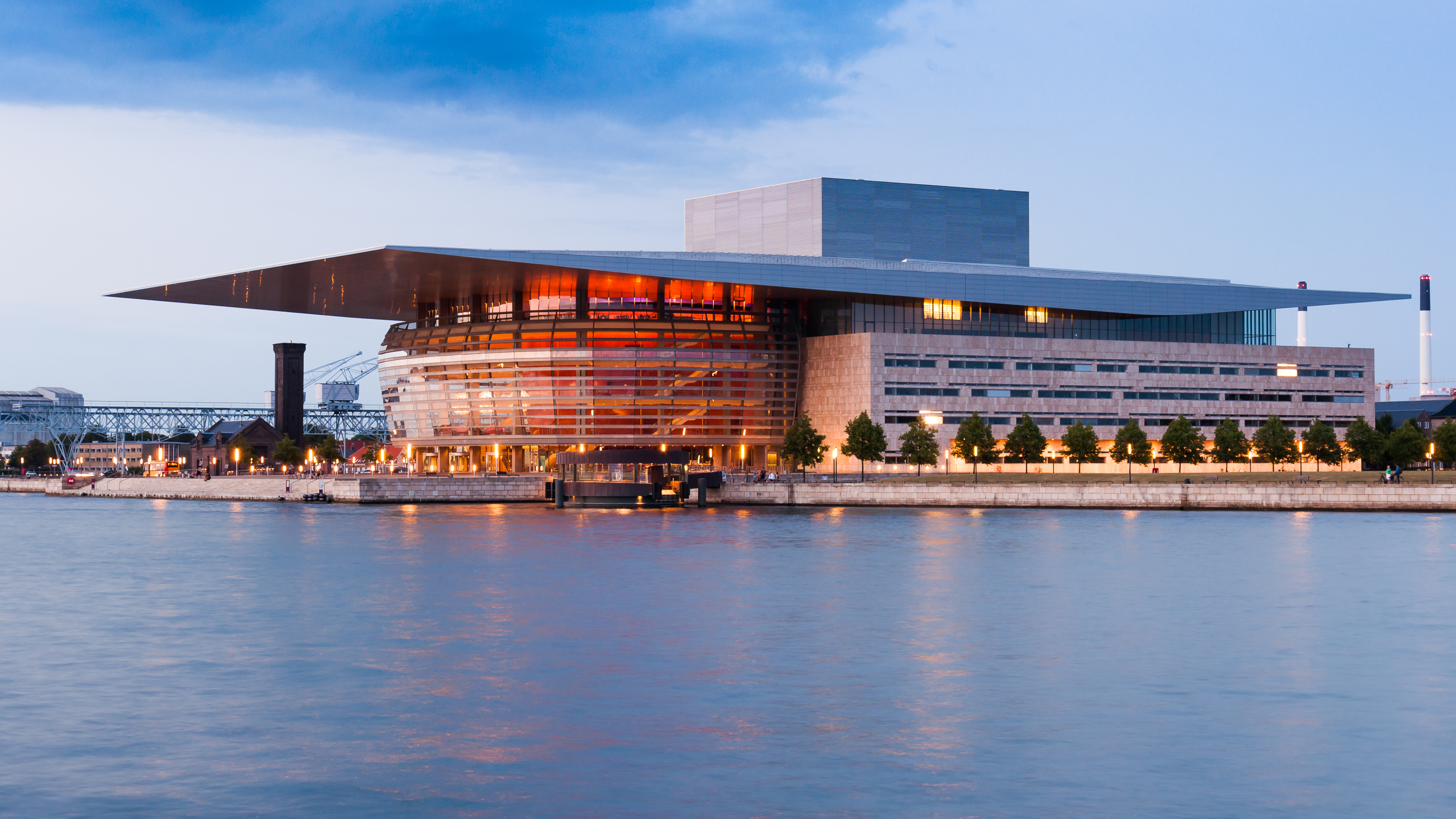
Copenhagen Opera House in Denmark

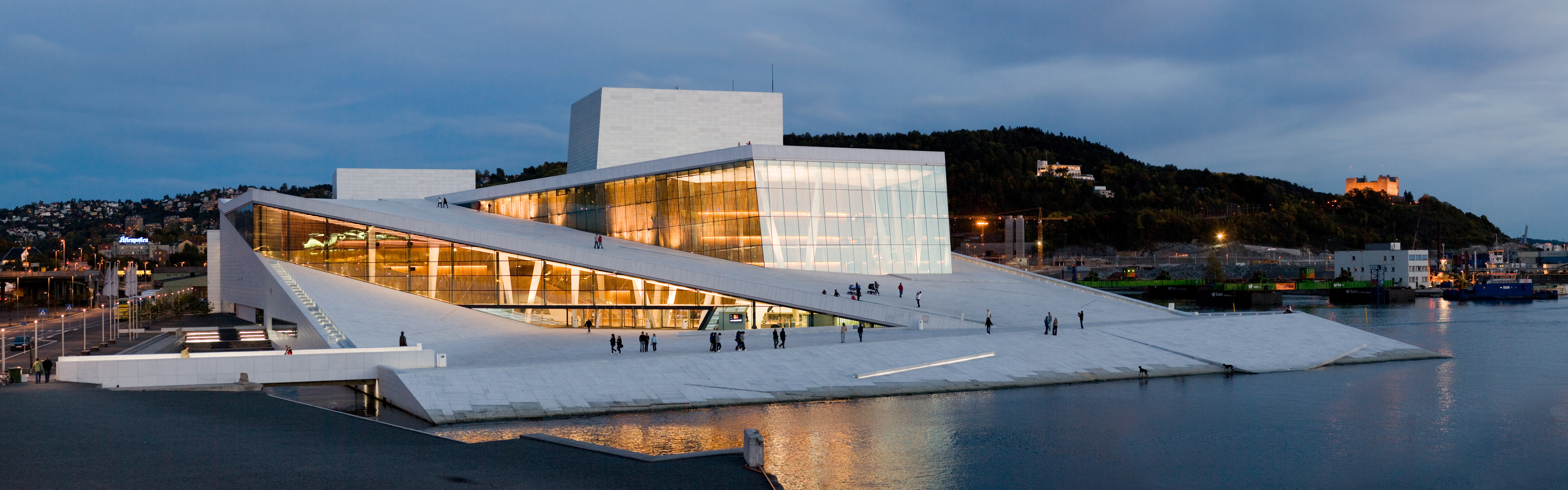
Oslo Opera House in Norway

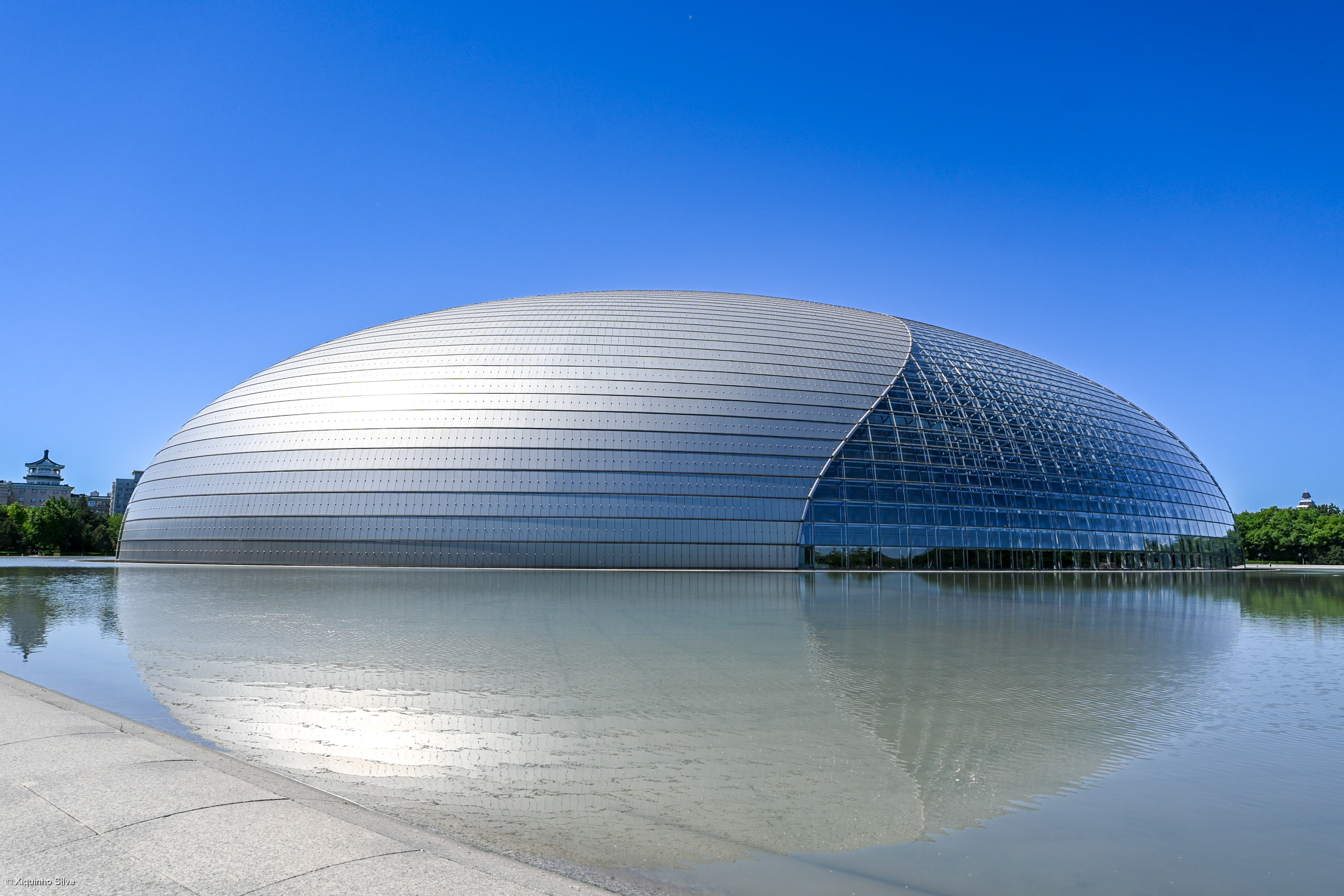
National Centre for the Performing Arts in Beijing, China

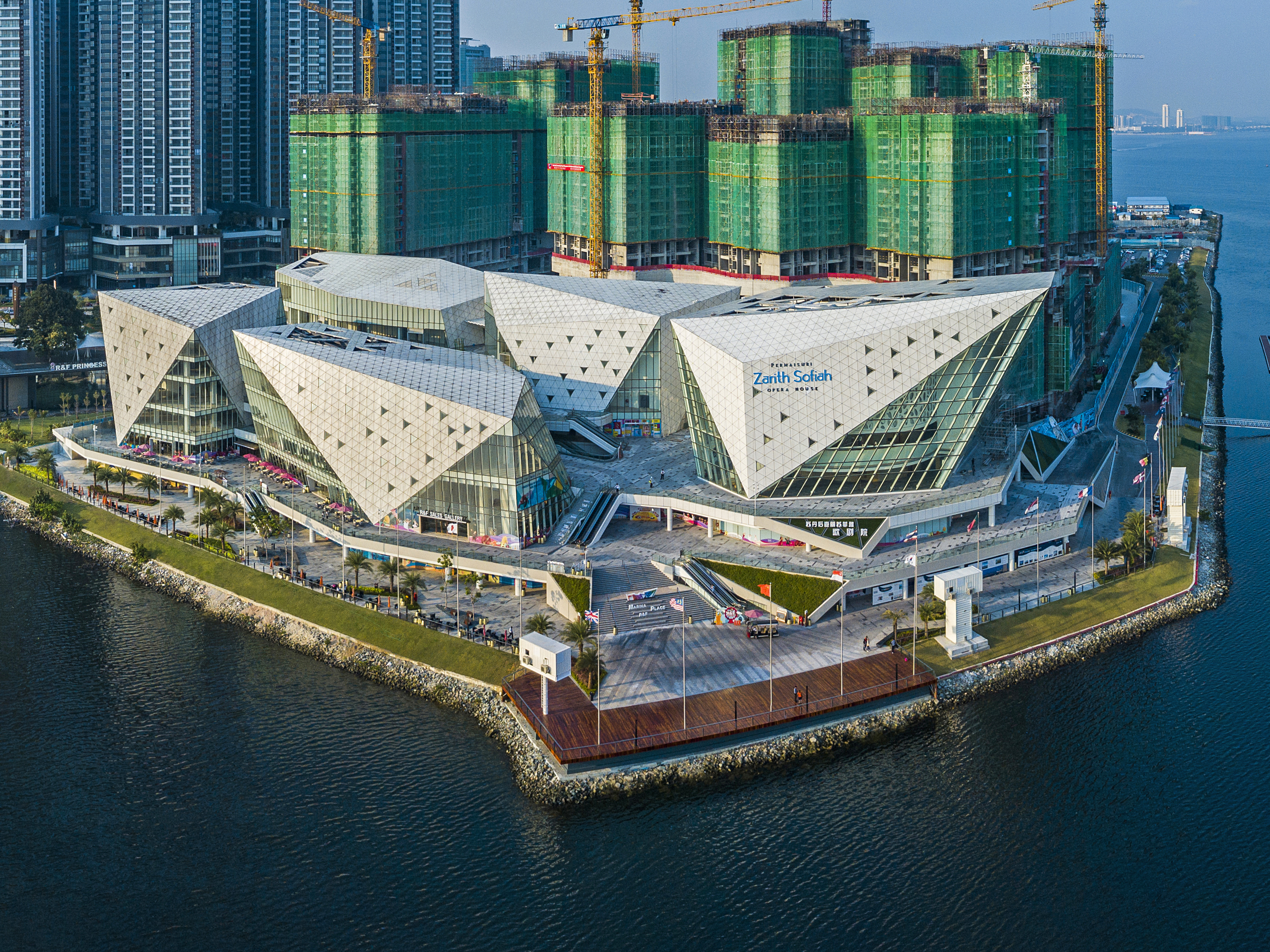
Permaisuri Zarith Sofiah Opera House in Johor Bahru, Malaysia

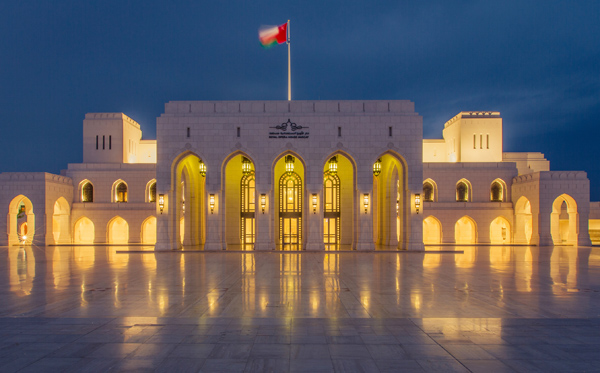
Royal Opera House Muscat in Oman

== See also ==
- List of opera houses
- List of opera festivals
- List of concert halls
- List of buildings
- Small-town opera house
- Architectural acoustics
