= Odeon of Pericles =

Building by the Acropolis of Athens, Greece

Coordinates: 37.9706°N 23.7287°E

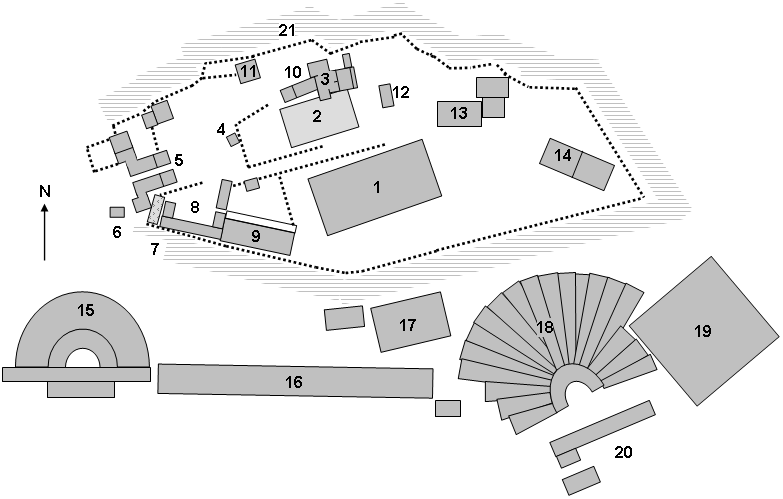
Site plan of the Acropolis at Athens showing the major archaeological remains – the Odeon is number 19, on the far right

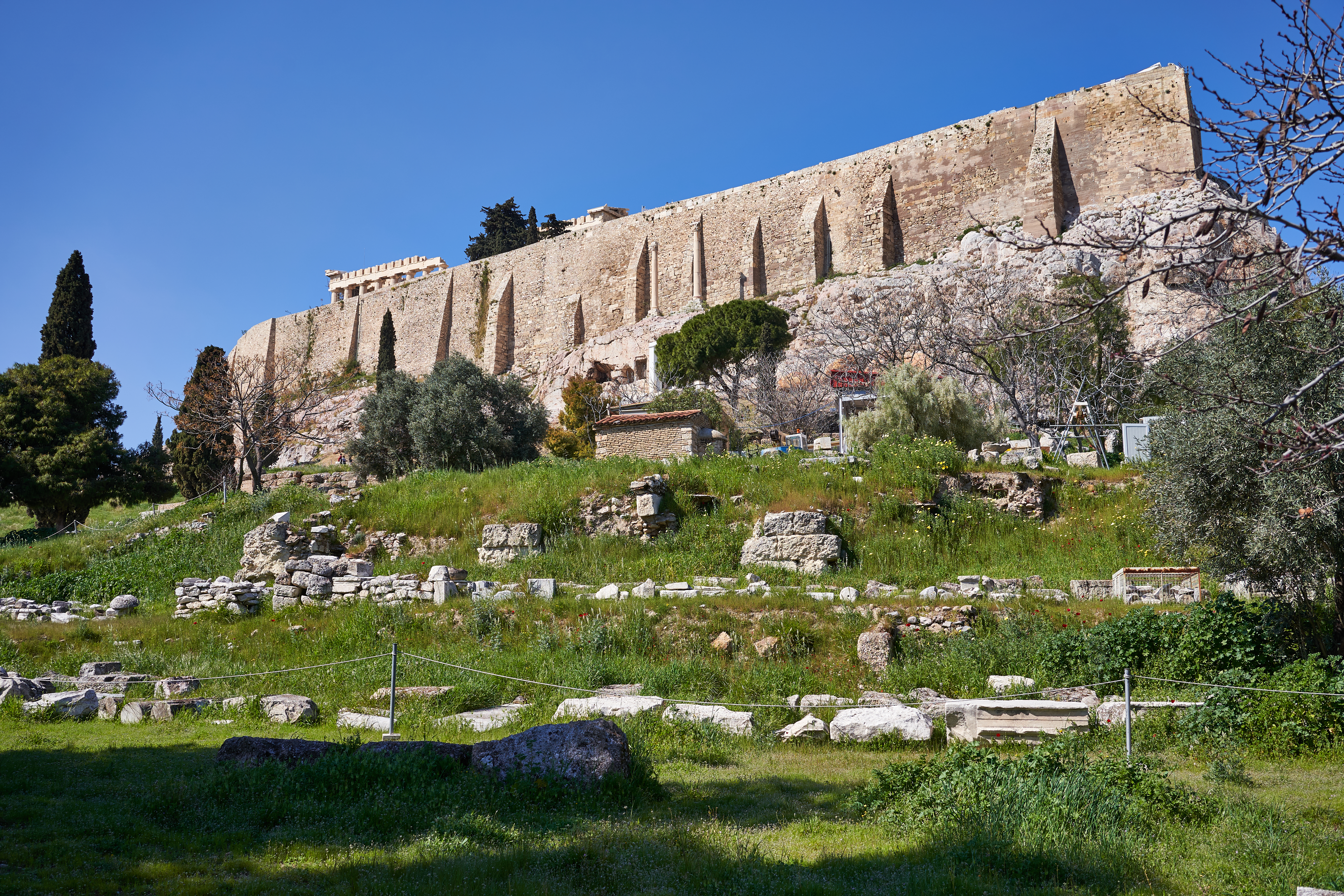
The ruins of the Odeon of Pericles in March 2020. The Acropolis of Athens is visible in the background

The Odeon of Athens or Odeon of Pericles in Athens was a 4,000 m^{2} (43,000 sq ft) odeon, built at the southeastern foot of the Acropolis in Athens, next to the entrance to the Theatre of Dionysus.

== History ==
It was first built in 435 BC by Pericles for the musical contests that formed part of the Panathenaea, for audiences from the theatre to shelter in case of bad weather and for chorus rehearsals. Certain Athenian courts such as the court of Archons meet there for alimony cases.

Few remains of it now survive, but it seems to have been "adorned with stone pillars" (according to Vitruvius and Plutarch) and square instead of the usual circular shape for an odeon. It was covered with timber made from captured Persian ships, culminating in a square pyramid-like roof resembling a tent. Pausanias wrote that the 1st century BC rebuild of it was "said to be a copy of Xerxes' tent", and that might well have applied to the original building.

Plutarch writes that the original building had many seats and many pillars. Modern excavation work has revealed its foundations as 62.40 by 68.60 m (204.7 by 225.1 ft), and it is now known that the roof was supported by 90 internal pillars, in nine rows of ten. From a few other passages, and from the scanty remains of such edifices, we may conclude further that it had an orchestra for the chorus and a stage for the musicians (of less depth than the stage of the theatre), behind which were rooms, which were probably used for keeping the dresses and vessels, and ornaments required for religious processions. It required no shifting scenery but its stage's back-wall seems to have been permanently decorated with paintings. For example, Vitruvius writes that, in the small theatre at Tralleis (which was doubtless an odeon), Apaturius of Alabanda painted the scaena with a composition so fantastic that he was compelled to remove it, and to correct it according to the truth of natural objects.

The original Odeon of Athens was burned down during Sulla's siege of Athens in the First Mithridatic War in 87–86 BC, either by Sulla himself or by his opponent Aristion for fear that Sulla would use its timbers to storm the Acropolis. It was later fully rebuilt by Ariobarzanes II of Cappadocia, using C. and M. Stallius and Menalippus as his architects. The new building was referred to by Pausanias in the 2nd century AD as "the most magnificent of all the structures of the Greeks". He also refers to a "figure of Dionysus worth seeing" in an odeon in Athens, though he does not specify which odeon.

== See also ==
- List of ancient Greek theatres
