= Theatre of ancient Greece =

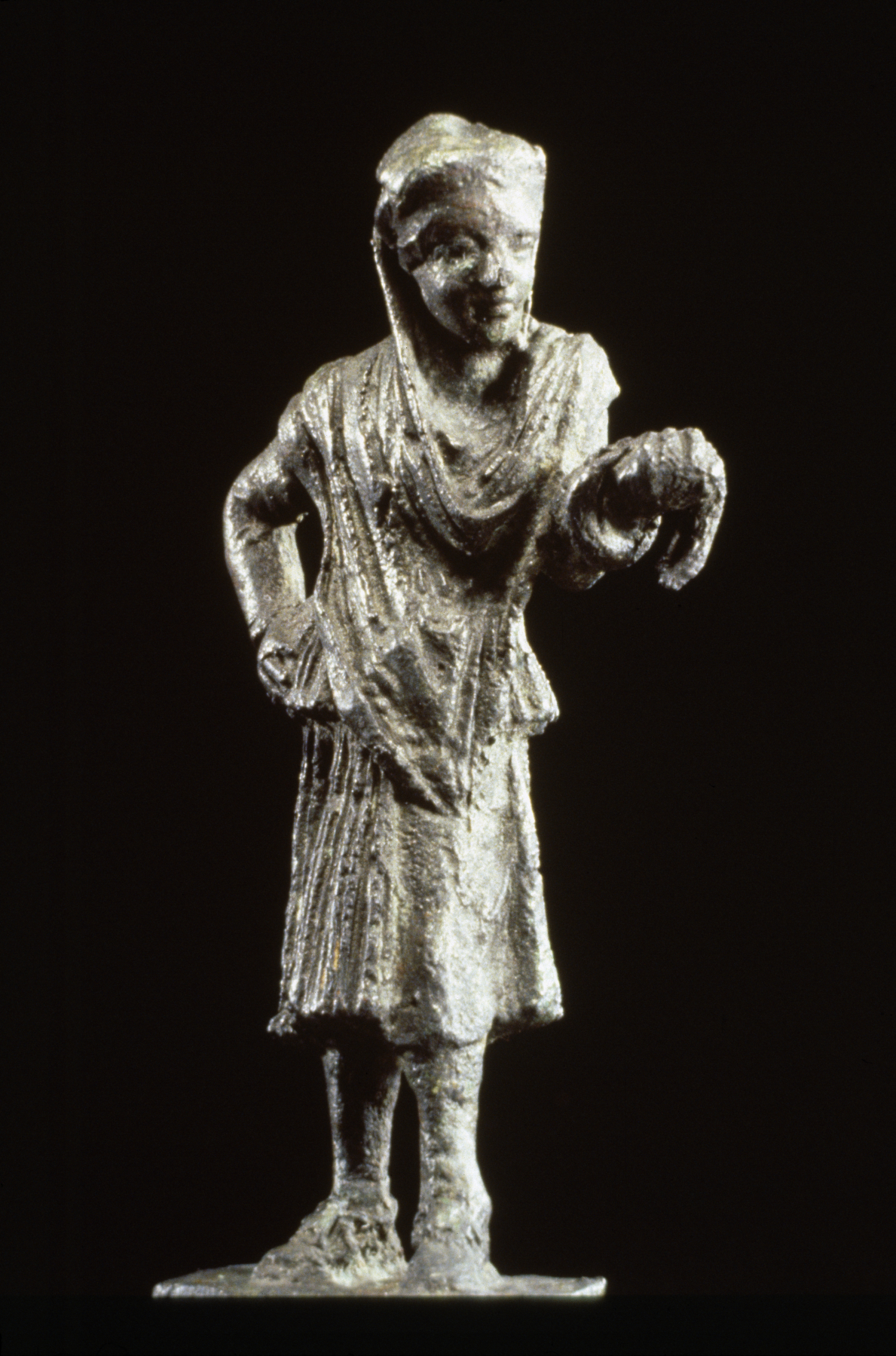
Bronze statue of a Greek actor, 150–100 BC. The half-mask over the eyes and nose identifies the figure as an actor. He wears a man's conical cap but female garments, following the Greek custom of men playing the roles of women. Later, slave women were brought in to play minor female characters and in comedy as well.

A theatrical culture flourished in ancient Greece from 700 BC. At its centre was the city-state of Athens, which became a significant cultural, political, and religious place during this period, and the theatre was institutionalised there as part of a festival called the Dionysia, which honoured the god Dionysus. Tragedy (late 500 BC), comedy (490 BC), and the satyr play were the three dramatic genres emerged there. Athens exported the festival to its numerous colonies. Modern Western theatre comes, in large measure, from the theatre of ancient Greece, from which it borrows technical terminology, classification into genres, and many of its themes, stock characters, and plot elements.

== Etymology ==
The word τραγῳδία, tragodia, from which the word "tragedy" is derived, is a compound of two Greek words: τράγος, tragos or "goat" and ᾠδή, ode meaning "song", from ἀείδειν, aeidein, 'to sing'.

This etymology indicates a link with the practices of the ancient Dionysian cults. It is impossible, however, to know with certainty how these fertility rituals became the basis for tragedy and comedy.

== Origins ==
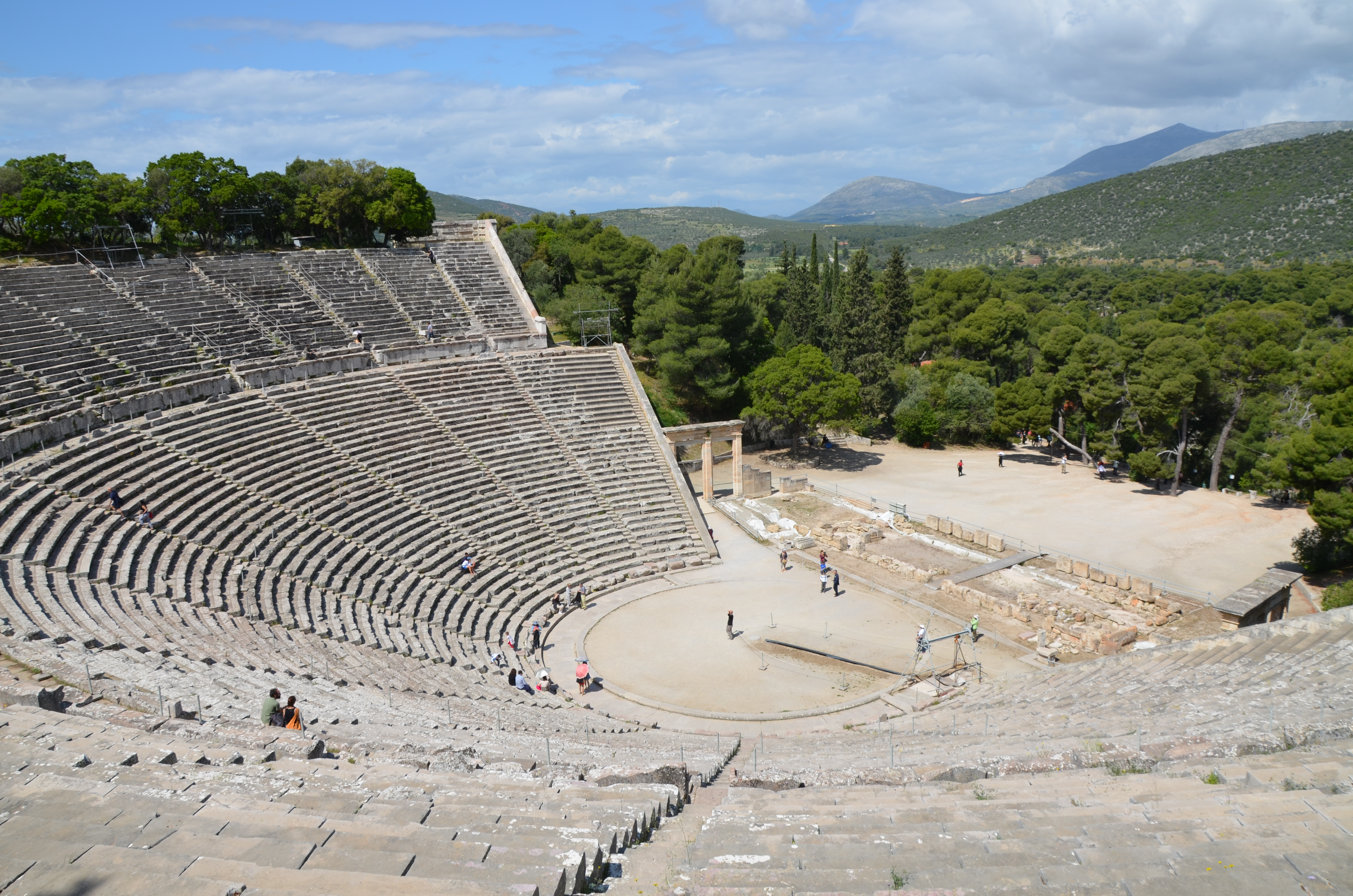
View of the ancient theatre at Epidaurus, considered by Pausanias the finest in Greece.

The Ancient Greeks valued the power of the spoken word, and it was their main method of communication and storytelling. Bahn and Bahn write, "To Greeks, the spoken word was a living thing and infinitely preferable to the dead symbols of a written language." Socrates himself believed that once something has been written down, it lost its ability for change and growth. For these reasons, among many others, oral storytelling flourished in Greece.

Greek tragedy, as it is known, was created in Athens around 532 BC, when Thespis was the earliest recorded actor. Being a winner of the first theatrical contest held in Athens, he was the exarchon, or leader, of the dithyrambs performed in and around Attica, especially at the Rural Dionysia. By Thespis' time, the dithyramb had evolved far away from its cult roots. Under the influence of heroic epic, Doric choral lyric and the innovations of the poet Arion, it had become a narrative, ballad-like genre. Because of these, Thespis is often called the "Inventor of Tragedy"; however, his importance is disputed, and Thespis is sometimes listed as late as 16th in the chronological order of Greek tragedians; the statesman Solon, for example, is credited with creating poems in which characters speak with their own voice, and spoken performances of Homer's epics by rhapsodes were popular in festivals prior to 534 BC. Thus, Thespis's true contribution to drama is unclear at best, but his name has been given a longer life in English as a common term for performer—i.e., a "thespian."

The dramatic performances were important to the Athenians – this is made clear by the creation of a tragedy competition and festival in the City Dionysia (or Great Dionysia). This was organized possibly to foster loyalty among the tribes of Attica (recently created by Cleisthenes). The festival was created roughly around 508 BC. While no drama texts exist from the sixth century BC, the names of three competitors besides Thespis are known: Choerilus, Pratinas, and Phrynichus. Each is credited with different innovations in the field.

Some information is known about Phrynichus. He won his first competition between 511 BC and 508 BC. He produced tragedies on themes and subjects later exploited in the Golden Age such as the Danaids, Phoenician Women and Alcestis. He was the first poet we know of to use a historical subject – his Fall of Miletus, produced in 493–2, chronicled the fate of the town of Miletus after it was conquered by the Persians. Herodotus reports that "the Athenians made clear their deep grief for the taking of Miletus in many ways, but especially in this: when Phrynichus wrote a play entitled The Fall of Miletus and produced it, the whole theatre fell to weeping; they fined Phrynichus a thousand drachmas for bringing to mind a calamity that affected them so personally and forbade the performance of that play forever." He is also thought to be the first to use female characters (though not female performers).Until the Hellenistic period, all tragedies were unique pieces written in honour of Dionysus and played only once; what is primarily extant today are the pieces that were still remembered well enough to have been repeated when the repetition of old tragedies became fashionable (the accidents of survival, as well as the subjective tastes of the Hellenistic librarians later in Greek history, also played a role in what survived from this period).

== New inventions during the classical period ==
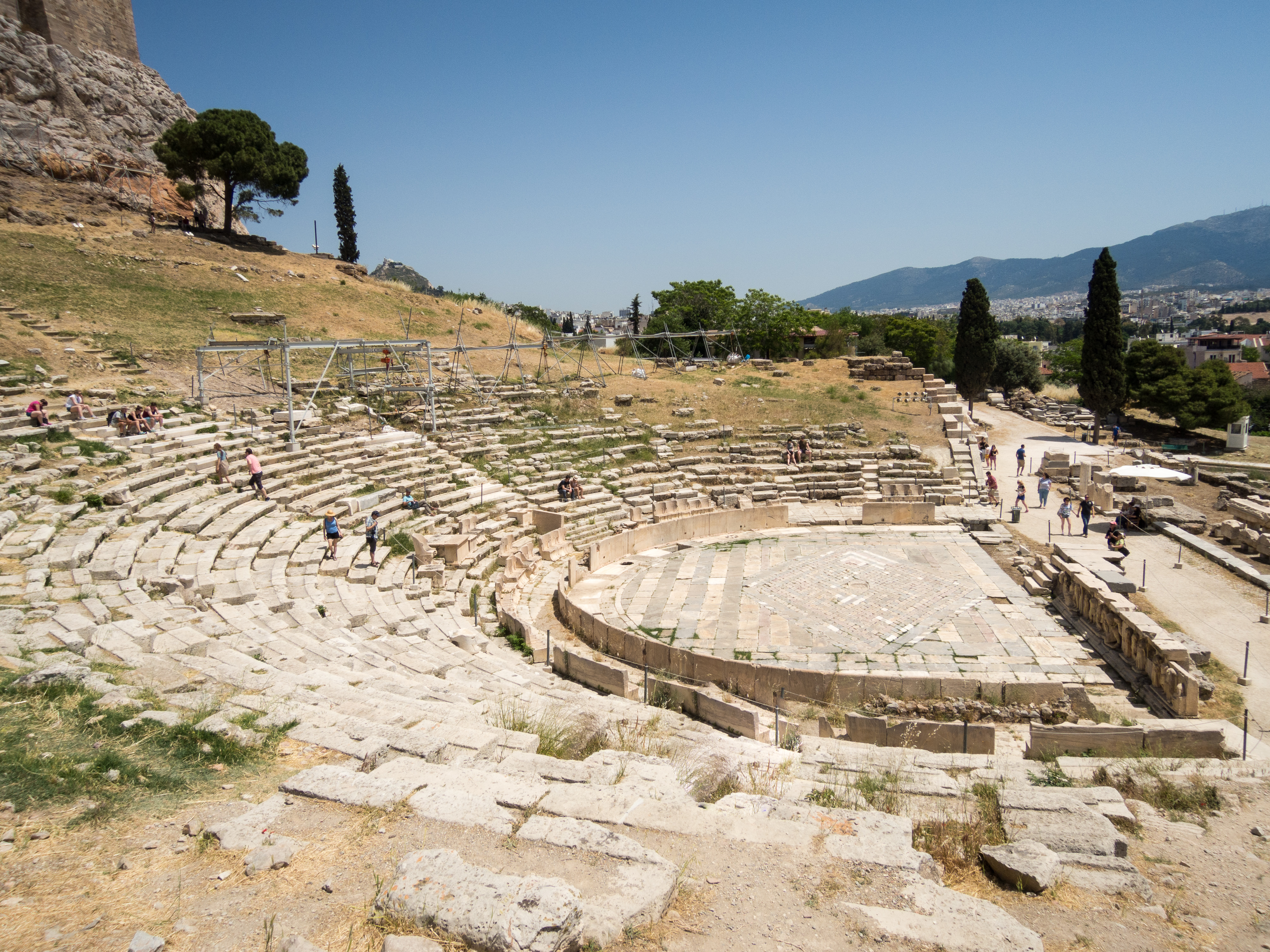
The Theatre of Dionysus

After the Achaemenid destruction of Athens in 480 BC, the town and acropolis were rebuilt, and theatre became formalized and an even greater part of Athenian culture and civic pride. This century is normally regarded as the Golden Age of Greek drama. The centrepiece of the annual Dionysia, which took place once in winter and once in spring, was a competition between three tragic playwrights at the Theatre of Dionysus. Each submitted three tragedies, plus a satyr play (a comic, burlesque version of a mythological subject). Beginning in a first competition in 486 BC each playwright submitted a comedy. Aristotle claimed that Aeschylus added the second actor (deuteragonist), and that Sophocles introduced the third (tritagonist). Based on what is known about Greek theatre, the Greek playwrights never used more than three actors.

Tragedy and comedy were viewed as completely separate genres, and no plays ever merged aspects of the two. Satyr plays dealt with the mythological subject matter of the tragedies, but in a purely comedic manner.

== Hellenistic period ==
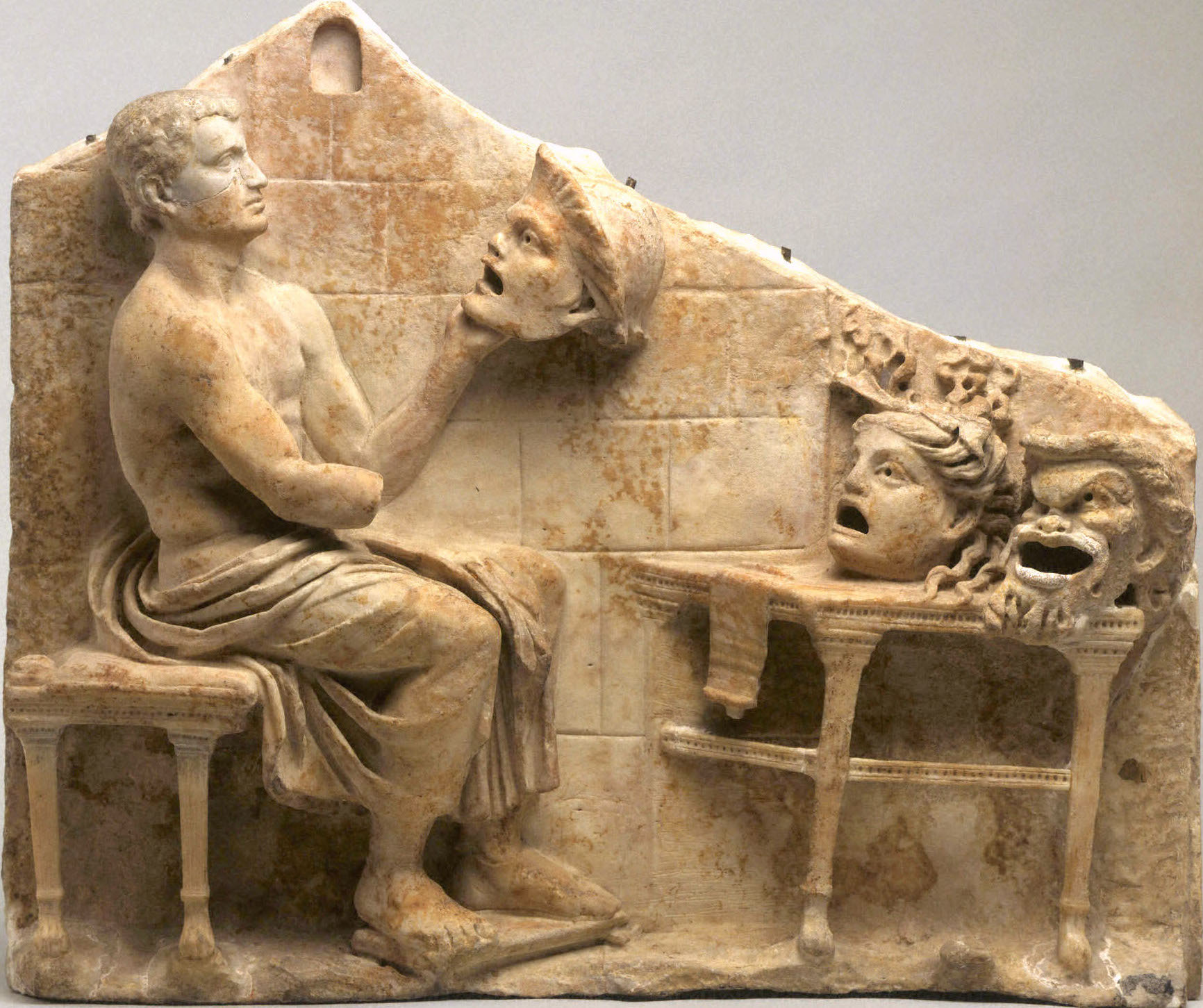
Roman, Republican or Early Imperial Relief of a seated poet (Menander) with masks of New Comedy, 1st century BC. – early 1st century AD, Princeton University Art Museum

The power of Athens declined following its defeat in the Peloponnesian War against Sparta. From that time on, the theatre started performing old tragedies again. Although its theatrical traditions seem to have lost their vitality, Greek theatre continued into the Hellenistic period (the period following Alexander the Great's conquests in the fourth century BC).

The primary Hellenistic theatrical form was not tragedy but New Comedy, comic episodes about the lives of ordinary citizens. The only extant playwright from the period is Menander. One of New Comedy's most important contributions was its influence on Roman comedy, an influence that can be seen in the surviving works of Plautus and Terence.

== Architecture ==
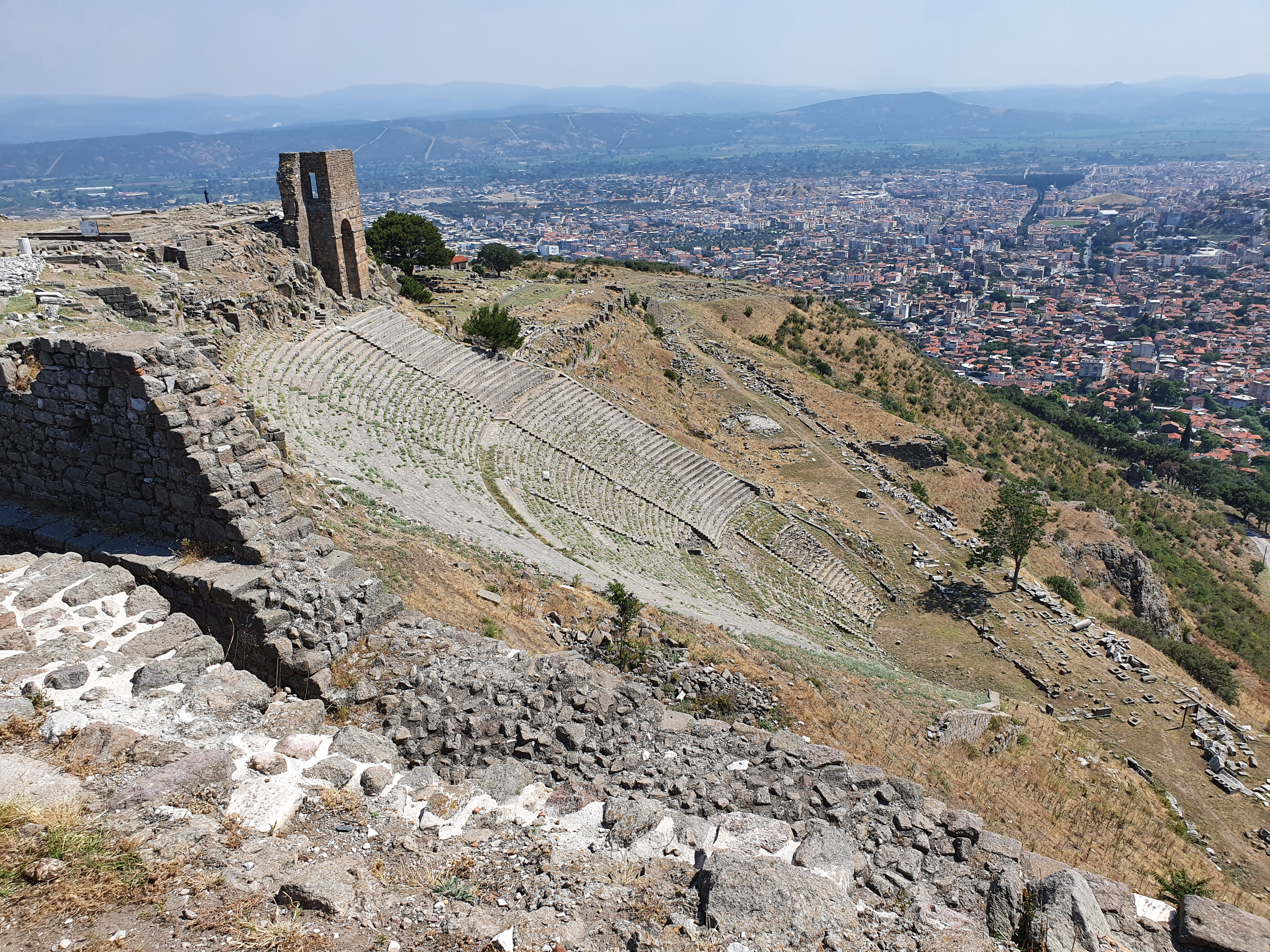
Theatre of Pergamon, one of the steepest theatres in the world, has a capacity of 10,000 people and was constructed in the 3rd century BC

Most ancient Greek cities lay on or near hills, so seating was generally built into the slope of a hill, producing a natural viewing area known as the theatron (literally "seeing place"). In cities without suitable hills, banks of earth were piled up. At the foot of the hill was a flattened, generally circular performance space with an average diameter of 78 feet (24 m), known as the orchestra (literally "dancing place"), where a chorus of typically 12 to 15 people performed plays in verse accompanied by music. There were often tall, arched entrances called parodoi or eisodoi, through which actors and chorus members entered and exited the orchestra. In some theatres, behind the orchestra, was a backdrop or scenic wall known as the skené.

The term theatre eventually came to mean the whole area of theatron, orchestra, and skené.

=== Theatron ===
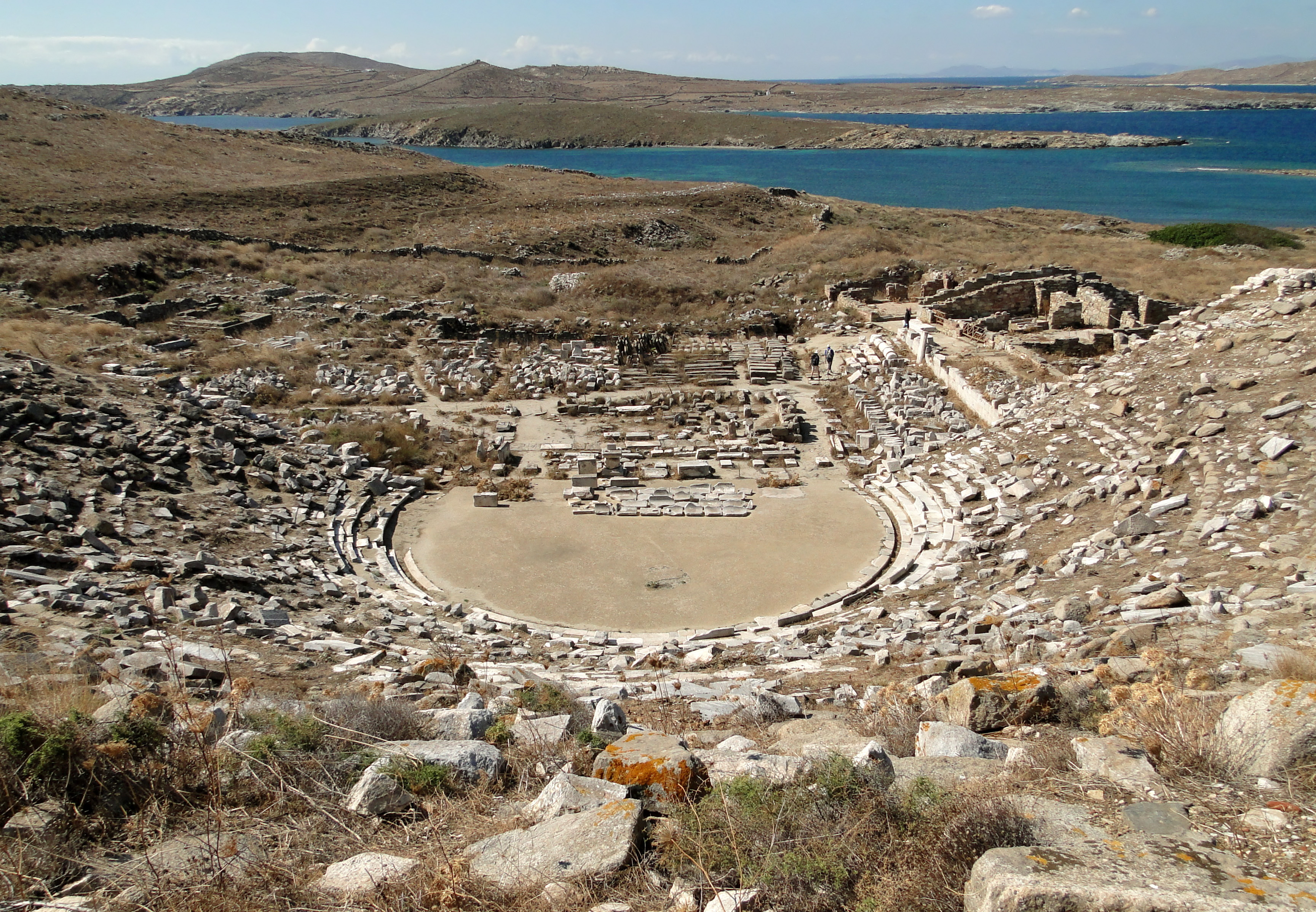
Ancient Greek theatre in Delos

The theatron was the seating area, built into a hill to create a natural viewing space. The first seats in Greek theatres (other than just sitting on the ground) were wooden, but around 499 BC, the practice of inlaying stone blocks into the side of the hill to create permanent, stable seating became more common. They were called the prohedra and reserved for priests and a few of the most respected citizens. The diazoma separated the upper and lower seating areas.

=== Skené ===
After 465 BC, playwrights began using a backdrop or scenic wall, called the skené (from which the word scene derives), that hung or stood behind the orchestra and also served as an area where actors could change their costumes. After 425 BC a stone scene wall, called a paraskenia, became a common supplement to skené. The paraskenia was a long wall with projecting sides, which may have had doorways for entrances and exits. Just behind the paraskenia was the proskenion ("in front of the scene"), which is similar to the modern day proscenium. The upper story was called the episkenion. Some theatres also had a raised speaking place on the orchestra called the logeion. By the end of the 5th century BC, around the time of the Peloponnesian War, the skené was two stories high.

The death of a character was always heard behind the skené, for it was considered inappropriate to show a killing in view of the audience. Conversely, there are scholarly arguments that death in Greek tragedy was portrayed off stage primarily because of dramatic considerations, and not prudishness or sensitivity of the audience.A temple nearby, especially on the right side of the scene, is almost always part of the Greek theatre complex. This could justify, as a transposition, the recurrence of the pediment with the later solidified stone scene.

=== Orchestra ===
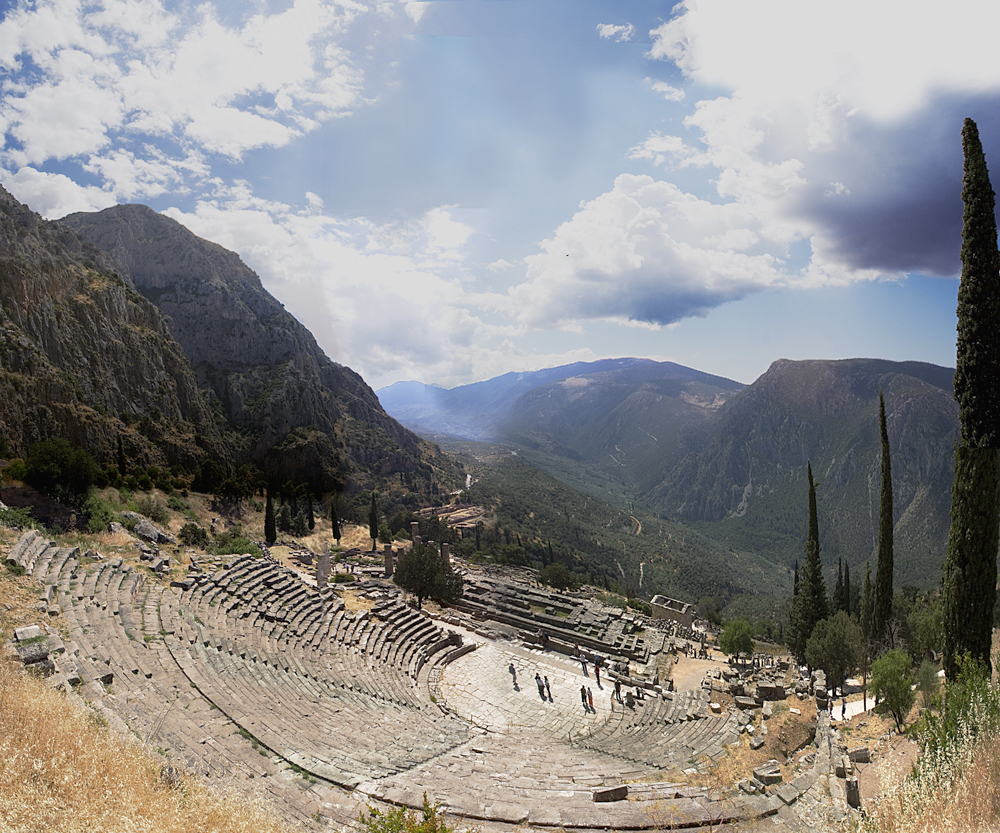
The Ancient Theatre of Delphi

The orchestra was a circular piece of ground at the bottom of the theatron where the chorus and actors performed; the word means "dancing space", as the chorus also danced in early periods. Originally unraised, Greek theatre would later incorporate a raised stage for easier viewing. This practice would become common after the advent of "New Comedy," which incorporated dramatic portrayal of individual characters. The coryphaeus was the head chorus member, who could enter the story as a character able to interact with the characters of a play. Plays often began in the morning and lasted into the evening.

=== Acoustics ===
The theatres were built on a large scale to accommodate a large number of performers on stage and in the audience—up to fourteen thousand. Physics and mathematics played a significant role in the construction of these theatres, as their designers had to be able to create acoustics in them such that the actors' voices could be heard throughout the theatre, including the very top row of seats. The Greek's understanding of acoustics compares very favourably with the current state of the art.

=== Scenic elements ===
There were several scenic elements commonly used in Greek theatre:

- mechane, a crane for lifting an actor to represent flying (thus, deus ex machina)
- ekkyklêma, a wheeled platform often used to bring dead characters into view for the audience
- pinakes, pictures hung to create scenery
- thyromata, more complex pictures built into the second-level scene (3rd level from the ground)

== Masks ==
=== Masks ===
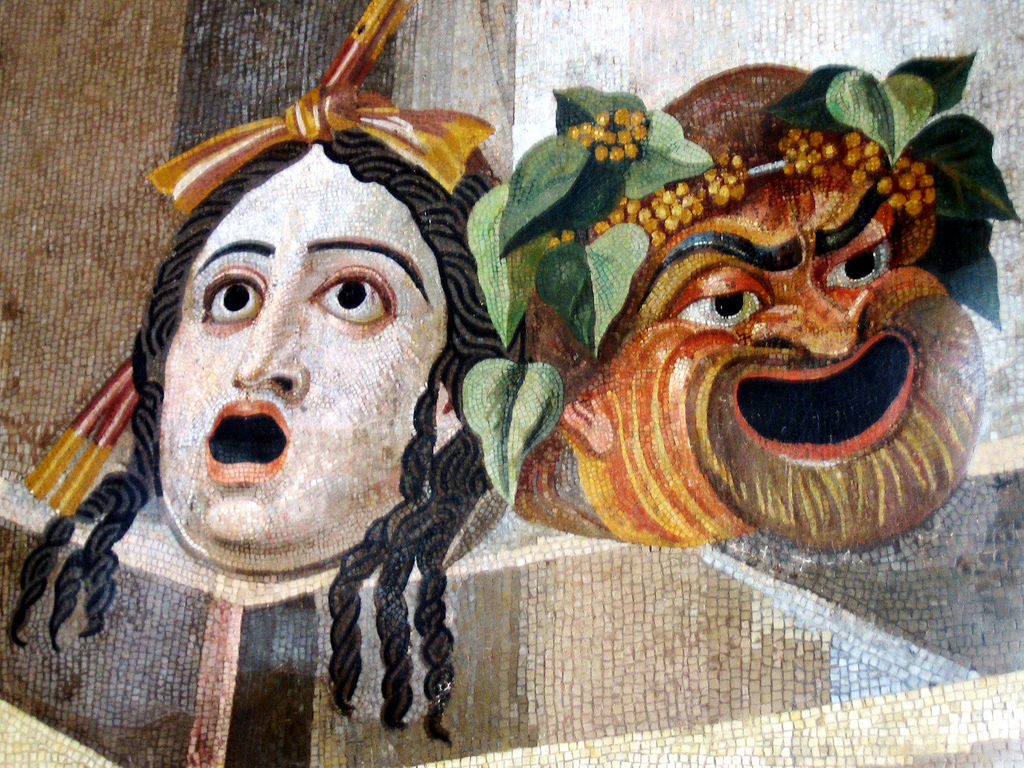
Tragic Comic Masks Hadrian's Villa mosaic

The Ancient Greek term for a mask is prosopon (lit., "face"), and was a significant element in the worship of Dionysus at Athens likely used in ceremonial rites and celebrations. Many masks worshipped the higher power, the gods, making masks also very important for religion. Most of the evidence comes from only a few vase paintings of the 5th century BC, such as one showing a mask of the god suspended from a tree with decorated robe hanging below it and dancing and the Pronomos vase, which depicts actors preparing for a satyr play. No physical evidence remains available to us, as the masks were made of organic materials and not considered permanent objects, ultimately being dedicated at the altar of Dionysus after performances. Nevertheless, the mask is known to have been used since the time of Aeschylus and considered to be one of the iconic conventions of classical Greek theatre.

Masks were also made for members of the chorus, who play some part in the action and provide a commentary on the events in which they are caught up. Although there are twelve or fifteen members of the tragic chorus, they all wear the same mask because they are considered to be representing one character.

Stylized comedy and tragedy masks said to originate in ancient Greek theatre have come to widely symbolize the performing arts generally.

=== Mask details ===
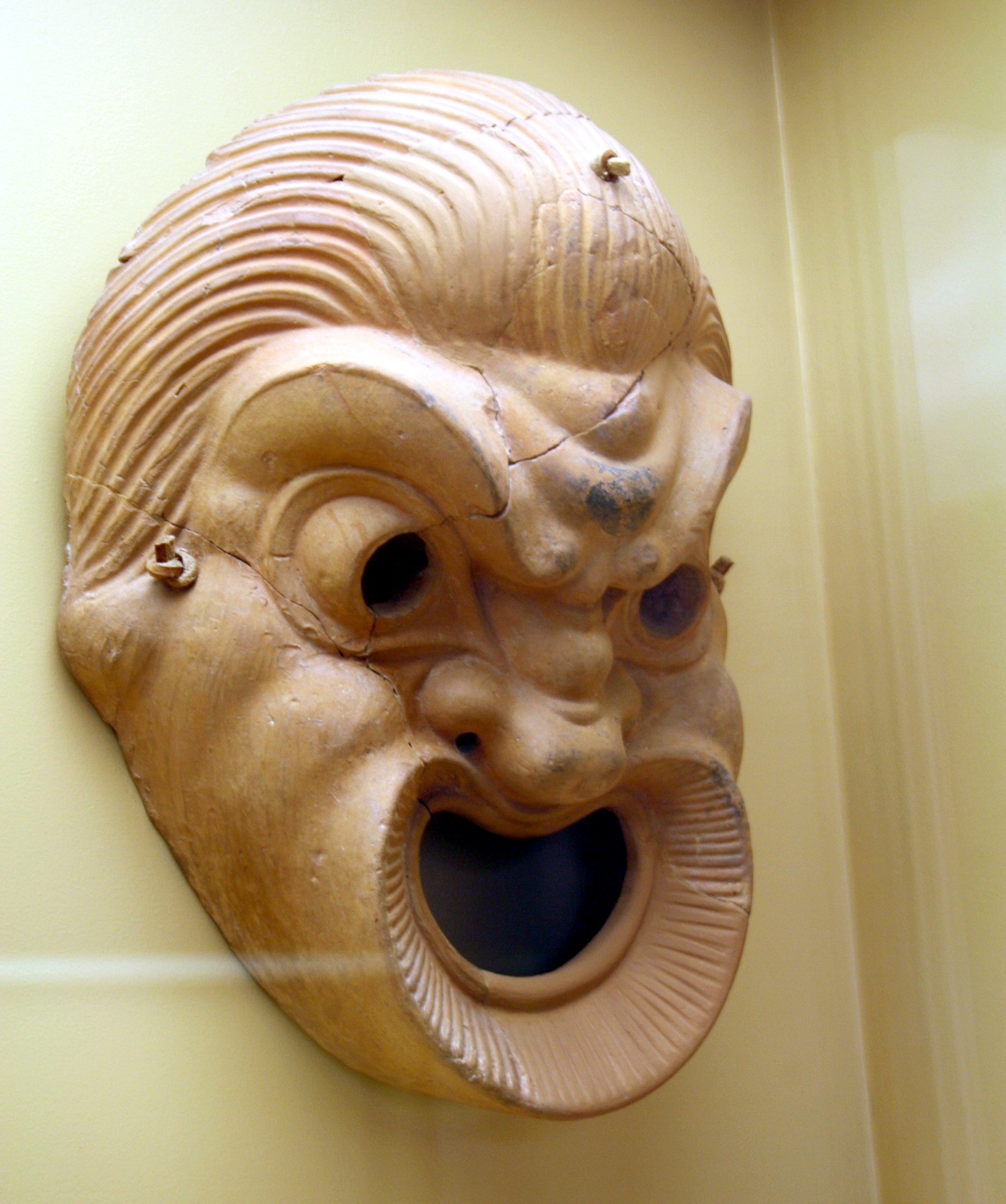
Mask dating from the 3rd century AD, Stoa of Attalos

Illustrations of theatrical masks from 5th century display helmet-like masks, covering the entire face and head, with holes for the eyes and a small aperture for the mouth and an integrated wig. These paintings never show actual masks on the actors in performance. They are most often shown being handled by the actors before or after a performance. This demonstrates the way in which the mask was to 'melt' into the face and allow the actor to vanish into the role. Effectively, the mask transformed the actor as much as memorization of the text. Therefore, performance in ancient Greece did not distinguish the masked actor from the theatrical character.

The mask-makers were called skeuopoios or "maker of the props", thus suggesting that their role encompassed multiple duties and tasks. The masks were most likely made out of lightweight, organic materials like stiffened linen, leather, wood, or cork, with the wig consisting of human or animal hair. Due to the visual restrictions imposed by these masks, it was imperative that the actors hear in order to orient and balance themselves. Thus, it is believed that the ears were covered by substantial amounts of hair and not the helmet-mask itself. The mouth opening was relatively small, preventing the mouth being seen during performances. Vervain and Wiles posit that this small size discourages the idea that the mask functioned as a megaphone, as originally presented in the 1960s. Greek mask-maker Thanos Vovolis suggests that the mask serves as a resonator for the head, thus enhancing vocal acoustics and altering its quality. This leads to increased energy and presence, allowing for the more complete metamorphosis of the actor into his character.

=== Mask functions ===
In a large open-air theatre, like the Theatre of Dionysus in Athens, the classical masks were able to create a sense of dread in the audience creating large scale panic, especially since they had intensely exaggerated facial features and expressions. They enabled an actor to appear and reappear in several different roles, thus preventing the audience from identifying the actor to one specific character. Their variations help the audience to distinguish sex, age, and social status, in addition to revealing a change in a particular character's appearance, e.g., Oedipus, after blinding himself. Unique masks were also created for specific characters and events in a play, such as the Furies in Aeschylus' Eumenides and Pentheus and Cadmus in Euripides' The Bacchae. Worn by the chorus, the masks created a sense of unity and uniformity, while representing a multi-voiced persona or single organism and simultaneously encouraged interdependency and a heightened sensitivity between each individual of the group. Only 2 to 3 actors were allowed on the stage at one time, and masks permitted quick transitions from one character to another. There were only male actors, but masks allowed them to play female characters.

The modern method to interpret a role by switching between a few simple characters goes back to changing masks in the theatre of ancient Greece.

=== Other costume details ===
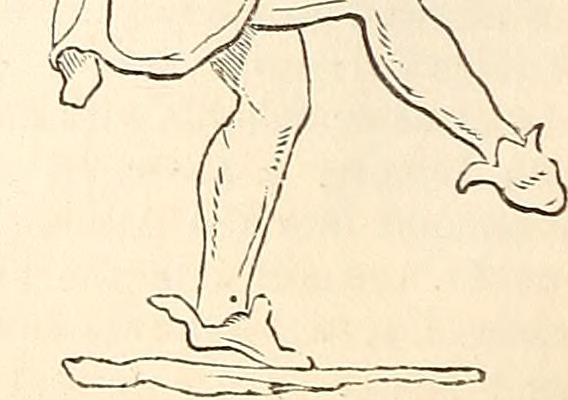
The soccus

The actors in these plays that had tragic roles wore boots called cothurnus (buskin), that elevated them above the other actors. The actors with comedic roles only wore a thin-soled shoe called a soccus or sock. For this reason, dramatic art is sometimes called "sock and buskin."

Male actors playing female roles would wear a wooden structure on their chests (posterneda) to imitate the look of breasts and another structure on their stomachs (progastreda) to make them appear softer and more lady like. They would also wear white body stockings under their costumes to make their skin appear fairer.

Most costuming detail comes from pottery paintings from that time as costumes and masks were fabricated out of disposable material, so there are little to no remains of any costume from that time. The biggest source of information is the Pronomos Vase where actors are painted at a show's after party.

Costuming would give off a sense of character, as in gender, age, social status, and class. For example, characters of higher class would be dressed in nicer clothing, although everyone was dressed fairly nicely. Contrary to popular belief, they did not dress in only rags and sandals, as they wanted to impress. Some examples of Greek theatre costuming include long robes called chiton that reached the floor for actors playing gods, heroes, and old men. Actors playing goddesses and women characters that held a lot of power wore purple and gold. Actors playing queens and princesses wore long cloaks that dragged on the ground and were decorated with gold stars and other jewels, and warriors were dressed in a variety of armor and wore helmets adorned with plumes. Costumes were supposed to be colourful and obvious to be easily seen by every seat in the audience.

== See also ==
- History of theatre
- Theatre of ancient Rome
- List of ancient Greek playwrights
- List of extant ancient Greek and Roman plays
- List of ancient Greek theatres
- Representation of women in Athenian tragedy
- Agôn
- Antistrophe
- Archon
- Aulos
- Chorêgos
- Chorus
  - Chorus of the elderly in classical Greek drama
- Didascaliae
- Didaskalos
- Eisodos
- Ekkyklêma
- Episode
- Epode
- Kommós
- Mêchanê
- Monody
- Ode
  - Epinikion
- Onomastì komodèin
- Parabasis
- Phlyax play
- Sparagmos
- Stásimon
- Stichomythia
- Strophê
- Thalia (Muse)
- Theoric fund
- Roman theatre (structure)
- List of films based on Greek drama
