= Bema of Phaidros =

Ancient Greek complex with reliefs in Athens

Coordinates: 37.97034°N 23.727784°E

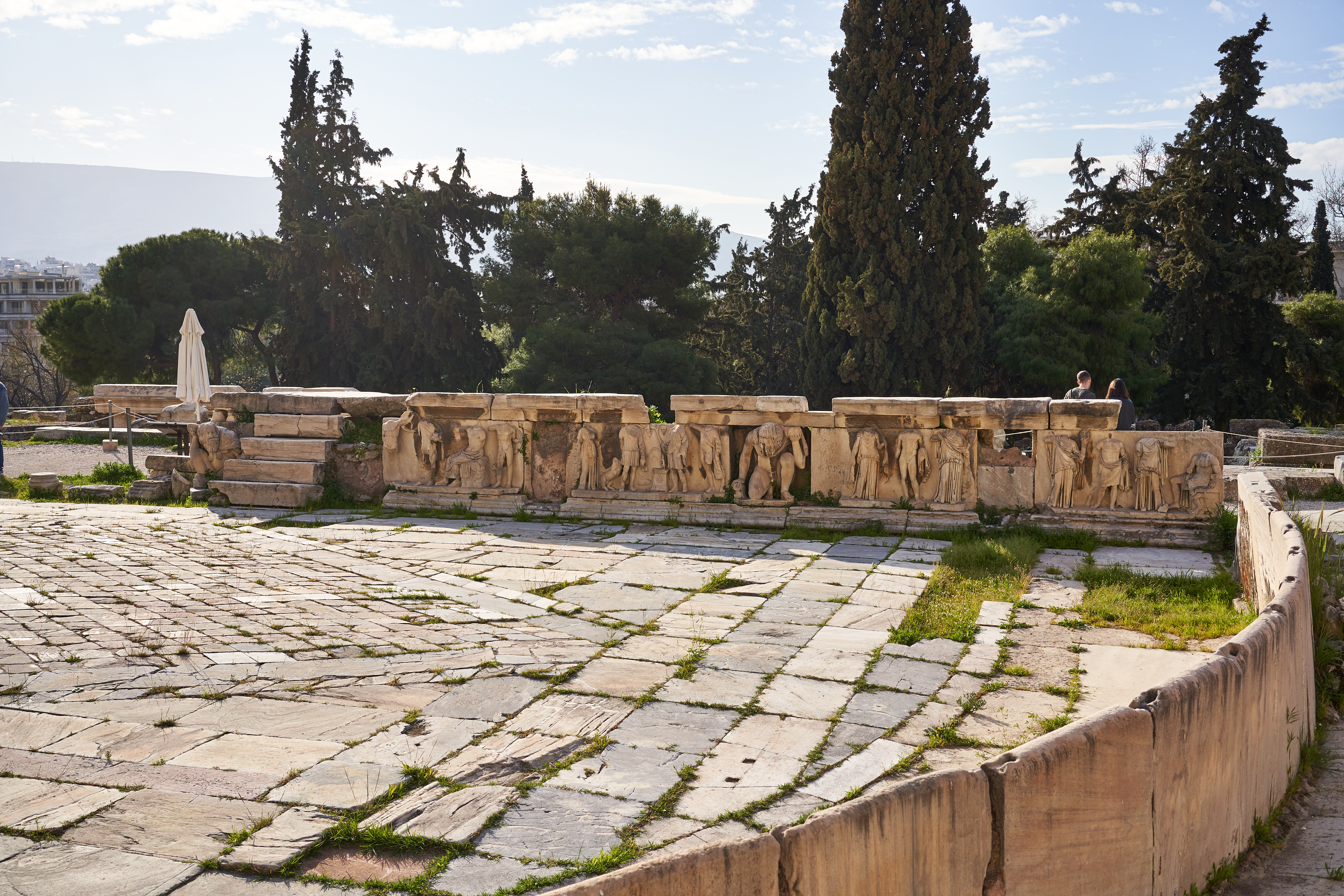
Bema of Phaidros with crouching Silenus

The Bema of Phaidros (Ancient Greek: Βῆμα τοῦ Φαίδρου) is the marble platform created in the third century CE that served as stage front to the Theatre of Dionysos in Athens. It is decorated with a Neo-Attic Roman sculpture of the Hadrianic or Antonine period, this sculpture was dismantled sometime in antiquity, moved from an unknown location, and rebuilt into the bema of the Theatre by Phaidros, archon of Athens. Four stone reliefs decorate the stage front illustrating scenes from the life of Dionysos they are: 1) The birth of Dionysos, 2) the entrance of Dionysos into Attica, 3) the sacred marriage of Dionysos and the Basilinna and 4) the enthronement of Dionysos. These scenes are framed by crouching Silenoi.

== Description ==
The sculpture, reading the from viewer's left to right, begins with a scene that can be taken to be the birth of Dionysos. It consists of four figures beginning with a semi-draped seated figure who is likely Zeus facing him is a youth holding a small child, presumed to be Hermes and the infant Dionysos at the moment of his second birth from the thigh of Zeus. Framing the scene are two nude male figures each holding a shield, these have been conjectured to be either korybantes or kouretes. The next slab represents the bestowing of the gift of wine, the introduction of the worship of Dionysos to Attica and alludes to the beginnings of tragedy. Again there are four figures; reading right to left they are, a young male figure in a chlamys and lion skin gesturing to his right. Immediately next is a figure identified by his attributes of grapevine, leopard skin and cothurni as Dionysos. Between him and the adjacent figure to his right is a small altar, this latter figure may be Ikarios accompanied by his dog Maera and a tethered goat. To the viewer's left is a draped female, possibly a maenad, sometimes identified as Erigone On the third slab are three figures with a fourth figure lost over time, they are conjectured to be from left to right Dionysus, the Basilinna and Tyche. The final slab on the viewer's far right consists perhaps of, from left to right, Tyche, Theseus, the Basilinna, and Dionysus enthroned.

It is evident from the way in which the sculptures have been cut down in size to fit their present placement, and for chronological reasons, that they are reused, secondary material. No conclusive solution has been put forward for the original date or location of the sculptures, though it has been suggested that they may have been meant for the scaenae frons of the high pulpitum built during the first half of the second century.

== See also ==
- Pergamon Altar
- Frieze of the Parthenon
- Las Incantadas
