= Erigone (daughter of Icarius) =

Daughter of Icarius of Athens in Greek mythology

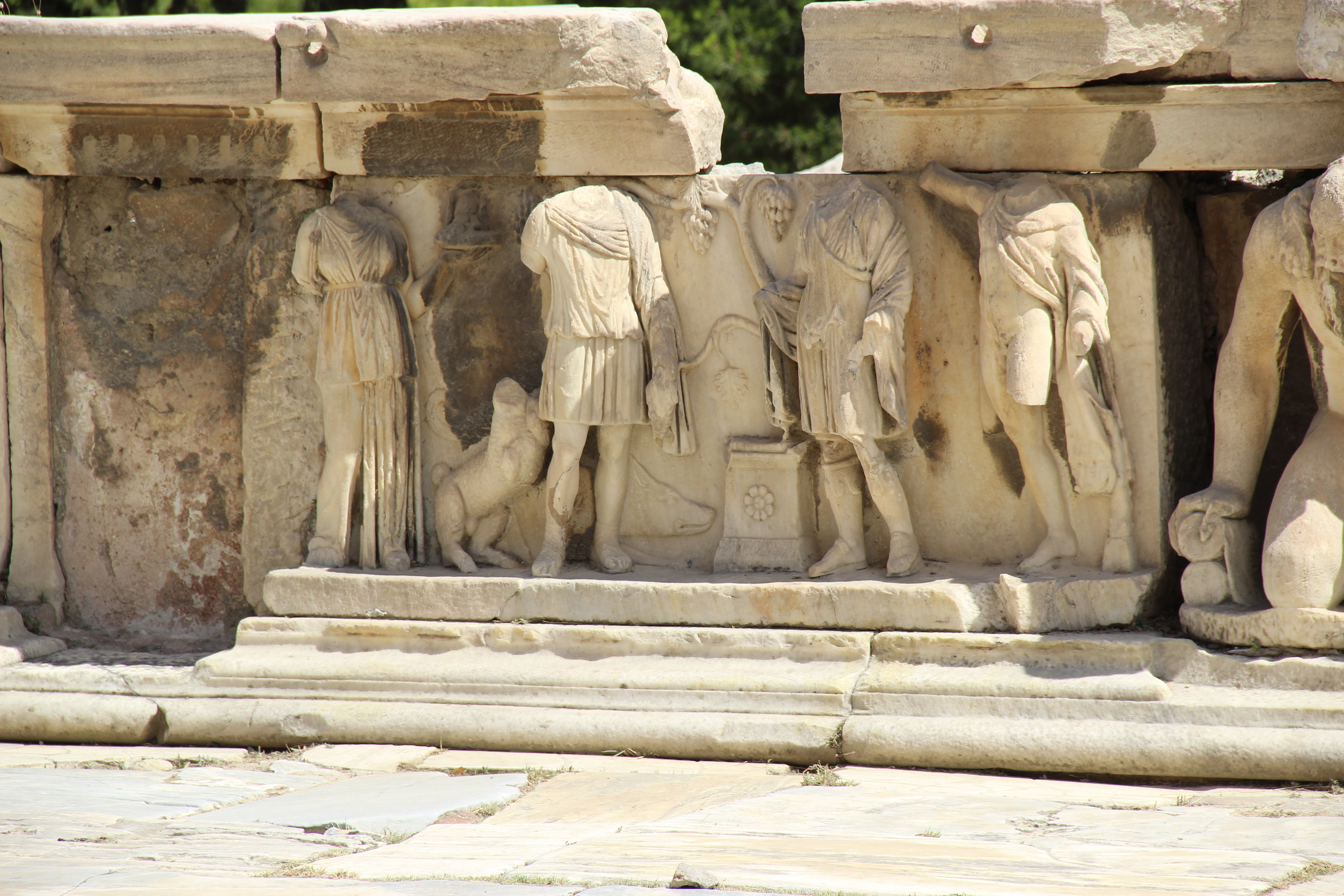
Erigone with her father welcome Dionysus; relief from the Bema of Phaidros, Theater of Dionysus in Athens, Greece.

In Greek mythology, Erigone (/ɪˈrɪɡəni/; Ancient Greek: Ἠριγόνη, romanized: Ērigónē, lit. 'early born') was the daughter of Icarius of Athens.

== Mythology ==
Icarius was cordial towards Dionysus, who gave his shepherds wine. They became intoxicated and killed Icarius, thinking he had poisoned them. His daughter, Erigone, and her dog, Maera, found his body. Erigone hanged herself over her father's grave. Dionysus was angry and punished Athens by making all of the city's maidens commit suicide in the same way. Erigone was placed in the stars as the constellation Virgo by Dionysus or Zeus who pitied her misfortune.

According to Ovid, Dionysus "deceived Erigone with false grapes", that is, assumed the shape of a grape cluster to approach and seduce her.
