= Ekkyklema =

Wheeled platform in ancient Greek theatre

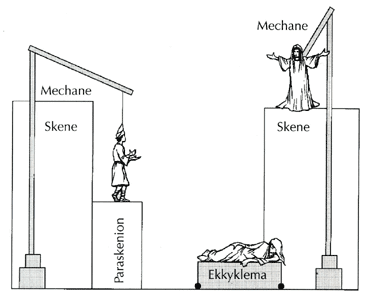
Diagram of an ancient Greek stage, showing the ekkyklema as a wheeled platform

An ekkyklema (lit. 'roll-out machine') (Note: Ancient Greek: εκκύκλημα; classical pronunciation: ekˈkyklɛːma. It is also rendered in English as eccyclema and ekkuklema. A variant Greek spelling is ἐγκύκλημα (enkuklema; classical pronunciation: eŋˈkyklɛːma).) was a wheeled platform used in ancient Greek theatre. From at least the middle of the fifth century BCE, it was used to reveal events conceived of as having happened within the skene, a structure behind the stage which usually represented some sort of interior space. Since early manuscripts of ancient Greek plays did not include stage directions, modern scholars must infer its use from evidence within the plays' dialogue, as well as from marginal notes (scholia) added by post-classical scholars to surviving manuscripts.

It is debated how often the ekkyklema was used in the original performances of known plays, and whether it featured in the plays of Aeschylus, the earliest tragic playwright whose works survive. Most scholars agree that it was used in Sophocles's tragedy Ajax (first performed in 442 or 441 BCE) and in certain tragic plays by Sophocles's contemporary Euripides. In tragedy, its function was often to reveal the aftermath of violent scenes which could not be shown on stage; in particular, to reveal corpses of characters killed within the skene. More direct evidence for the use of the ekkyklema is found in three fifth-century BCE comedies by Aristophanes, where it is referenced in dialogue often parodying the use of the device in tragic drama. Its use may have increased after the fifth century BCE, and it has been conjectured as featuring in a later fourth-century BCE work of New Comedy by the Athenian Menander.

== Name and description ==
In ancient Greek theatre, the action took place in front of the skene, a structure which formed the backdrop to the play and usually symbolised some sort of closed-off space away from the audience's sight, such as a house, palace or cave. The ekkyklema was a small, (Note: In his reconstruction of the fifth-century BCE Athenian stage, Graham Ley suggests that a square platform with sides 3 metres (9.8 ft) in length is the largest reasonable reconstruction, and adopts a working hypothesis that it was approximately square with sides of 2.5 metres (8.2 ft).) wheeled platform, which could be wheeled out into the performance area through the doors of the skene with an actor or actors upon it. Some ancient sources suggest that it may have been revolved or turned. During the Hellenistic period (323–30 BCE), a similar device, called the exostra (lit. 'out-shover'), was also used.

The device is not specifically mentioned in Aristotle's Poetics, a fourth-century BCE work of dramatic theory whose surviving parts concern tragedy. (Note: Hölscher 1994, p. 95, citing Aristotle, Poetics, 1449b33, 1453b.) The noun ekkyklema is first attested in the Onomastikon, a second-century CE thesaurus of Attic Greek words written by the lexicographer Julius Pollux, (Note: Ashby 1999, p. 90. On the Onomastikon, see Pietrobelli 2019, p. 13.) though the corresponding verb ekkykleo (ἐκκυκλέω, lit. 'I roll out') is used to describe its operation in the comedy Acharnians by the Athenian Aristophanes, first performed in 425 BCE. The Onomastikon describes it thus:

τὸ μὲν ἐκκύκλημα, ἐπὶ ξύλων, ὑψηλὸν βάθρον, ᾧ ἐπίκειται θρόνος. δείκνυσι δὲ καὶ τὰ ὑπὸ τὴν σχηνὴν ἐν ταῖς οἰχίαις ἀπόῤῥητα πραχθέντα. καὶ τὸ ῥῆμα τοῦ ἔργου καλεῖται ἐγκυκλεῖν. ἐφ᾽ οὗ δὲ εἰσάγεται τὸ ἐγκύκλημα, εἰσκύκλημα ὀνομάζεται. καὶ χρὴ τοῦτο νοεῖσθαι καθ᾽ ἑκάστην θύραν. οἱονεὶ, καθ᾽ ἑκάστην οἰκίαν.
The ekkyklema: a high platform, on wooden supports, upon which a chair is placed. It shows things that have been done secretly behind the skene in the houses. And the verb for its operation is ekkyklein ['to roll out']. The place through which the ekkyklema is brought in is called the eiskyklema. And it is necessary to understand there as being one of these for each doorway – that is, for each house.

The same definition – that the ekkyklema was used to reveal events imagined as taking place within a house behind the stage – is found in the Suda, a Byzantine encyclopaedia dating to the tenth century CE, and in a marginal note (scholium) of the Hellenistic period in a manuscript of the tragedy Hippolytus by Euripides.

== Use in ancient Greek theatre ==
A red-figure vase (krater) painted in Apulia, c. 340 – c. 330 BCE. Clifford Ashby suggests that the ekkyklema may have carried a structure similar to the columned pavilion in the centre.

John Gould calls the ekkyklema "one of the stranger conventions of fifth-century stagecraft". Since early manuscripts of Greek plays did not include stage directions, its use must be inferred from clues in the plays' dialogue. The earliest secure evidence for its use is in Aristophanes's comedic plays Acharnians and Thesmophoriazousai, first performed in 425 and 411 BCE respectively. It was used relatively rarely in Greek tragedy. It has been conjectured by several scholars, including Karl Otfried Müller, A. M. Dale and Augusta Webster, to have been used at various points in the plays of Aeschylus (c. 525/524 – c. 456/455 BCE), (Note: Graham Ley specifically suggests that it was invented while Aeschylus was composing his Eumenides, first performed in 458 BCE, and that Aeschylus revised his text of the play so that it could be used in it.) though Oliver Taplin rejects these suggestions and considers that the device was probably not invented until after Aeschylus's death. (Note: Taplin 1977, p. 443, cited at Gould 1978, p. 65, n. 22. Goldhill suggests that the device was used "from the time of late Aeschylus at least".) Martin Revermann suggests that the parodic use of the ekkyklema in Aristophanes's Acharnians, where it is used as part of a scene involving the tragic playwright Euripides, implies that it was regularly employed when staging tragic drama but more unusual in comedy.

Uvo Hölscher argues that, while the ekkyklema is primarily used to reveal interior scenes to the audience, its invention cannot be explained as a means of fulfilling this function, since Hellenistic drama commonly performed such scenes on the stage in front of the skene; he suggests that it was developed for dramatic reasons, to allow "the sudden revelation of a startling sight". Eric Csapo suggests that the device was primarily associated with bringing tragic gods and heroes onto and off the stage, while Jacques Jouanna characterises it as being used for "the visible proof of acts that decency did not allow [the playwright] to show the spectators", particularly the display of corpses.

The Theatre of Dionysus in Athens, where all known Greek plays were initially performed, underwent substantial renovations at some point after the middle of the fifth century BCE; these probably date to around 350 BCE. As part of these, a stone platform, approximately 7 by 3 metres (23 by 10 ft), was constructed extending out from the skene. Scott Scullion suggests that this was intended to support the ekkyklema, though Alan Hughes considers that it is both too short for this function, given that the ekkyklema would be rolled almost 10 metres (33 ft) beyond the skene, and unnecessarily wide for the probable dimensions of the ekkyklema. Several mentions of the use of the ekkyklema are made in post-classical scholia in manuscripts of ancient plays: modern scholars consider that many of these pertain to scenes which would not necessarily have involved the device when originally performed. It has been suggested that this may reflect greater use of the ekkyklema in performances of ancient drama after the fifth century BCE. (Note: Nunquist 2019, p. 357, who credits the suggestion to, among others, Ulrich von Wilamowitz-Moellendorff, citing von Wilamowitz 1959, pp. 153–154.)

=== In tragedy and satyr plays ===
In tragedy, scenes of bloodshed are almost never made visible to the audience, but instead take place offstage. The ekkyklema would be used to reveal the results of those actions, bringing part of the interior scene (imagined to have taken place within the skene) out into view. Its uses often involved bringing in actors in a stationary position, such as being seated or lying in bed, or bringing corpses onto the stage, as with Hippolytus's dying body in the final scene of Euripides's play of the same name, or the corpse of Eurydice draped over the household altar in Sophocles' Antigone. A. M. Dale argues that it was also used to move items of scenery to indicate a change of scene, and suggests Aeschylus's Eumenides (first performed in 458 BCE) and Sophocles's Ajax (first performed in 442 or 441 BCE) as examples where a bush or a statue may have been brought onto and off the stage using it. She further suggests that it would have been used at the end of Aeschylus's Net Haulers, (Note: In Greek, Δικτυουλκοί (Diktyoulkoi).) a satyr play, to move a chest containing the characters Danaë and Perseus out of the skene onto the stage; Hölscher accepts this possibility as congruent with what he considers to have been uses of the ekkyklema in Aeschylean tragedy.

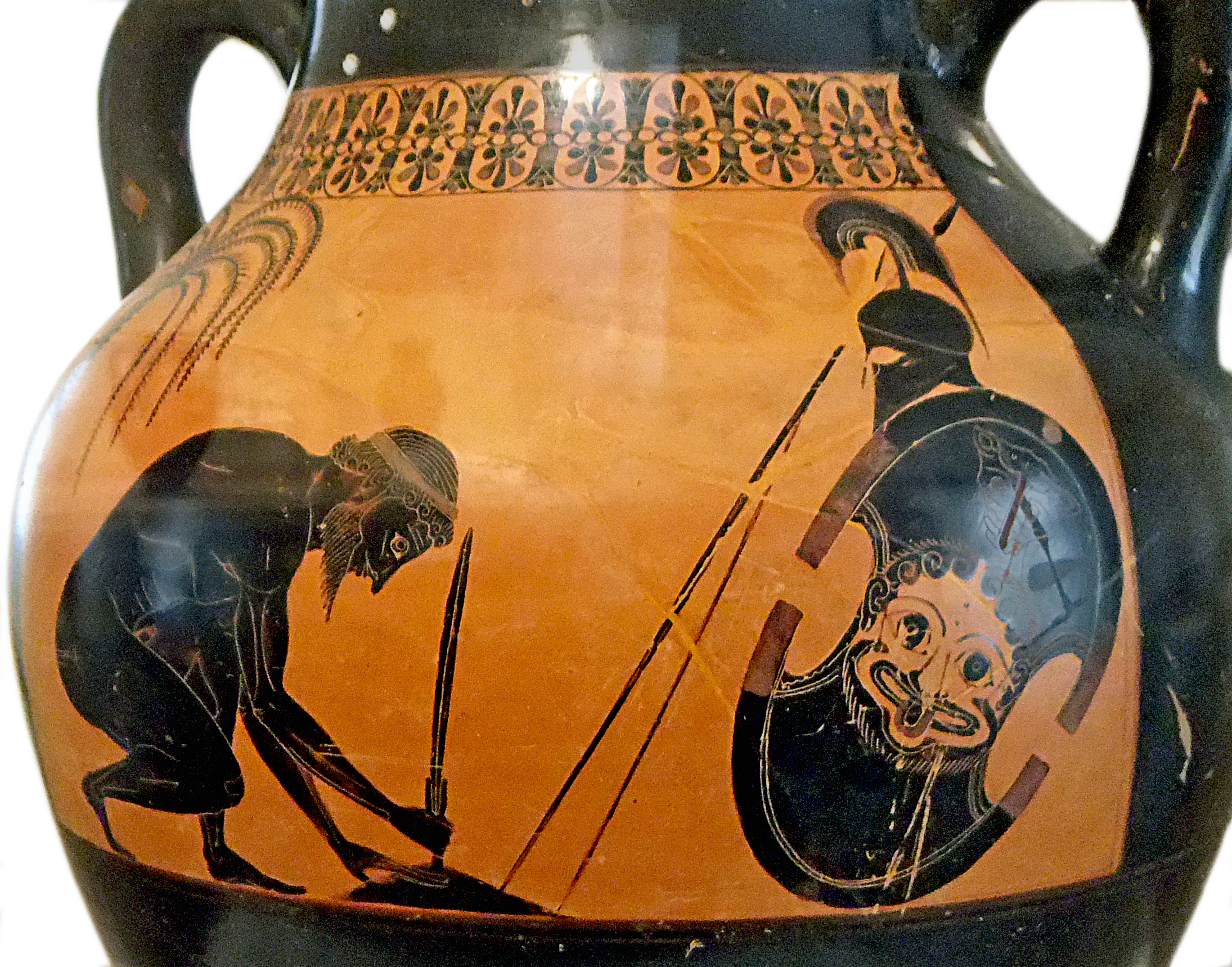
The suicide of Ajax, depicted on a black-figure vase by the Athenian Exekias around 530 BCE. It is generally agreed that Sophocles's portrayal of this scene used the ekkyklema.

Scholars debate precisely which scenes in Greek tragedy would have involved the ekkyklema. The earliest play for which its use is generally agreed is Sophocles's Ajax, in which it is believed to have been used to stage the final monologue and suicide of the titular character, (Note: The idea has been known since at least 1809, when Christian Lobeck proposed it in his edition of the text: other early commentators to suggest the use of the ekkyklema included Rudolf Heinrich Klausen in 1834 and Erich Bethe in 1894.) though Michael Ewens has argued that dramatic considerations make it more likely that these events were instead performed in the orchestra, at the far front of the performance area, (Note: Jacques Jouanna points out that the relevant scene in the Ajax shares several phrases of dialogue, which he takes to be directions for the use of the ekkyklema, with the parodic ekkyklema scene in Aristophanes's Acharnians.) and Andrew Brown has suggested that Ajax's body was concealed behind "some boscage in the doorway" of the skene rather than being removed via the ekkyklema. (Note: Scullion 1994, p. 95, n. 20, citing Brown 1984, pp. 10–11.) It is also generally agreed to have been used in Euripides's Hippolytus, first performed in 428 BCE, and to depict the re-entrance of the title character near the end of his Herakles, first performed around 416 BCE. In the latter, Herakles appears on it bound and surrounded by the bodies of his family, whom he has killed in a divinely induced fit of madness. (Note: Taplin states that this moment highlights the flexibility of the distinction between indoor and outdoor space in Greek tragedy; Herakles is depicted as being bound inside the skene, but notices the sun and wind when he awakes on the ekkyklema.)

The ekkyklema may also have been used to show Clytemnestra standing over the bodies of her husband Agamemnon and his slave Cassandra in Aeschylus's Agamemnon, following their offstage murders supposedly within the skene, (Note: Taplin rejects this suggestion as based on unsound evidence.) and for the parallel scene later in the play's sequel, The Libation Bearers, when Orestes, the son of Agamemnon and Clytemnestra, is revealed to have killed his mother and her lover Aegisthus in revenge; its use for the latter is claimed by a scholium made in one surviving manuscript of the play. Jacques Jouanna suggests that the device was used for a similar scene at the end of Sophocles's Elektra, first performed around 420–414 BCE, to reveal Orestes, his companion Pylades, and the corpse of Clytemnestra to Aegisthus. Hölscher suggests that it may also have been used to reveal the blinded Oedipus at the end of Sophocles's Oedipus Tyrannos, first performed around 429 BCE, but states that this would not have been dramatically necessary, and that the only certain use of the ekkyklema in Sophocles is that in the Ajax. Aristophanes of Byzantium, a Greek scholar active in the third and second centuries BCE, criticised Euripides for a second use of the ekkyklema in his Hippolytus (to introduce the character Phaedra), though modern scholars consider that it was not necessarily used here. (Note: Nunquist 2019, p. 357, citing as an example Barrett (ed.) 1964, p. 318.)

In Euripides's Medea, Jason calls to Medea, who has just murdered their children, to open the door of the skene to bring their bodies out; Donald J. Mastronarde comments that this would lead the audience to expect the use of the ekkyklema, but that this expectation is then subverted when Medea is instead revealed by means of a mechane (crane), lifting her and the children's bodies above the stage on a prop chariot. Karl Reinhardt suggested in 1949 that the ekkyklema was used in Aeschylus's Prometheus Bound to bring onstage a large dummy representing the title character, in which his actor would be concealed – Taplin rejects this as contrary to the conventional use of the ekkyklema to reveal interior scenes, and as requiring an excessively large door in the skene. (Note: Davidson considers the use of the ekkyklema in this scene "a neat solution" to the challenges of staging it in a realistic way, but that it is not possible to say with certainty whether such a realistic staging would have been considered desirable.) Taplin also rejects the common suggestion that the ekkyklema was used at various points in Aeschylus's Libation Bearers. T. B. L. Webster suggested in 1970 that the ekkyklema would have been brought out at the beginning of Sophocles's Philoctetes and then left on the stage as an item of scenery, to provide a setting for the title character's threat to throw himself from a cliff; John Davidson calls this "highly unlikely", since the extra height gained by ascending the ekkyklema would have still left the actor lower than many of the spectators in the theatre's tiered seats. (Note: Prior to its rebuilding in the fourth century BCE, the seating area of the Theatre of Dionysus reached 27.3 metres (90 ft) in elevation above the performance area.)

=== In comedy ===
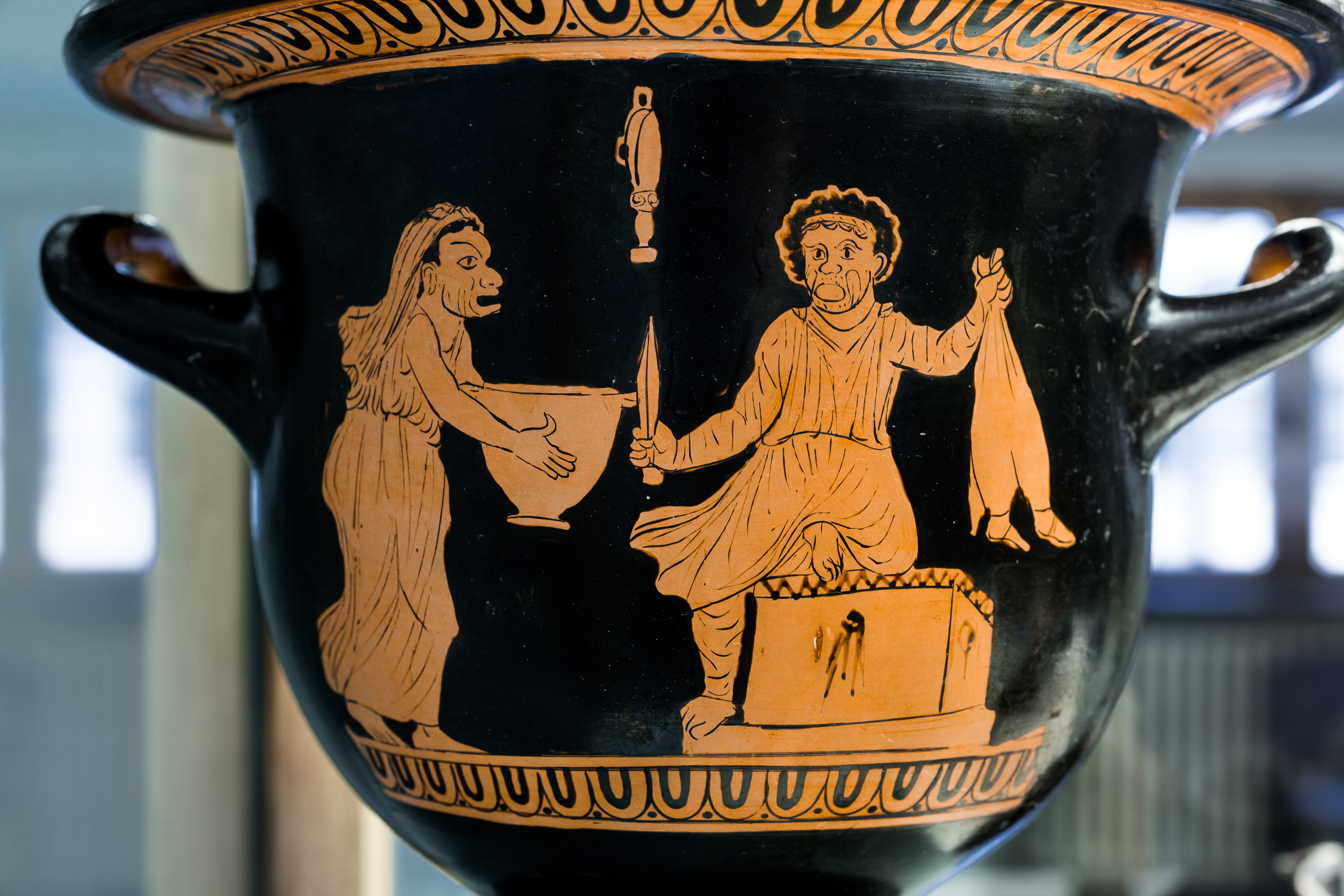
A burlesque (phlyax) scene from the Thesmophoriazusae, depicted on an Apulian krater, c. 370 BCE

The use of the ekkyklema in comedy can be inferred from the use of etymologically related words, such as "roll out", around the introduction of a character. In this genre, it is commonly used to parody tragic drama by introducing characters with comedically excessive fanfare. In the comedies of Aristophanes (c. 446 – c. 386 BCE), the ekkyklema is primarily associated with Euripides and his fellow fifth-century playwright Agathon. In the Acharnians (first performed in 425 BCE), Aristophanes has the protagonist Dikaiopolis visit Euripides at his home; the latter's doorkeeper complains that he cannot be seen, as he is "inside and not inside", and the playwright subsequently rolls himself out on the ekkyklema. Similarly, in the Thesmophoriazusae, first performed in 411 BCE, Agathon is wheeled onstage on an ekkyklema. It was also used by Aristophanes at the beginning of The Birds, first performed in 414 BCE, to bring the character Epops out of the woods: Scott Scullion calls this "the exception that proves the rule" that the ekkyklema is only used to reveal the interior of a dwelling, and suggests that the humour of the moment rested on the fact that a forest cannot, as Epops orders it to be, literally "opened" like a door. (Note: Rosie Wyles, in contrast, argues that it is impossible from the surviving evidence to be sure that such a convention – that the ekkyklema should only be used to reveal interior scenes – truly existed.)

A scholium on a manuscript of Aristophanes's Clouds, first performed in 423 BCE, states that the device was used to reveal the inside of Socrates's school or "Thinkery". Modern scholars debate whether this is likely to have happened; Kenneth Dover, Alan Sommerstein and C. W. Dearden are among those endorsing the idea, while Revermann and Csapo consider the matter uncertain. (Note: According to Uvo Hölscher, the ekkyklema depicting the "Thinkery" included a superstructure, from which Socrates was suspended in a platform, and remained on stage throughout the play.) Elsewhere in the Clouds, it may have been used to remove the props placed on the stage at the beginning of the play to indicate the inside of the character Strepsiades's house, or this task may have been done by stage hands. It may also have been used in Aristophanes's Knights, first performed in 424 BCE, to re-introduce the character Demos after his rejuvenations, and in the same playwright's Peace (first performed in 421 BCE), to bring the titular goddess onto the stage. In New Comedy, it was possibly used to bring onto the stage the injured Knemon in Menander's Dyskolos ('The Misanthrope'), first performed in 316 BCE.

== Works cited ==
- Ashby, Clifford (1999). Classical Greek Theatre: New Views of an Old Subject. Studies in Theatre History and Culture. Iowa City: University of Iowa Press. ISBN 0-87745-641-0.
- Brockett, Oscar G.; Hildy, and Franklin J. (2003). History of the Theatre (9th (International) ed.). Boston: Allyn and Bacon. ISBN 0-205-41050-2.
- Brown, Andrew L. (1984). "Three and Scene-Painting Sophocles". Proceedings of the Cambridge Philosophical Society. New Series. 30: 1–17. JSTOR 44698800.
- Chondros, Thomas G.; Milidonis, Kypros; Vitzilaios, George; Vaitsis, John (2013). "'Deus-Ex-Machina' Reconstruction in the Athens Theater of Dionysus". Mechanism and Machine Theory. 67: 172–191. doi:10.1016/j.mechmachtheory.2013.04.010.
- Csapo, Eric; Slater, William J. (1994). The Context of Ancient Drama. Ann Arbor: University of Michigan Press. ISBN 0-472-08275-2.
- Csapo, Eric (2010). "The Production and Performance of Comedy in Antiquity". In Dobrov, Gregory W. (ed.). Brill's Companion to the Study of Greek Comedy. Leiden and Boston: Brill. pp. 103–142. ISBN 978-9004-10963-6.
- Dale, Amy Marjorie (1969) [1956]. "Seen and Unseen on the Greek Stage". In Webster, T. B. L.; Turner, E. G. (eds.). A. M. Dale: Collected Papers. Cambridge University Press. pp. 119–129. ISBN 0521047633.
- Davidson, John (2005). "Theatrical Production". In Gregory, Justina (ed.). A Companion to Greek Tragedy. Blackwell Companions to the Ancient World. Malden, Mass., and Oxford: Blackwell. pp. 194–211. ISBN 1-4051-7549-4.
- Euripides (1964). Barrett, W. Spencer (ed.). Hippolytos. Oxford University Press. ISBN 0-19-814167-X.
- Euripides (2002). Mastronarde, Donald J. (ed.). Medea. Cambridge Greek and Latin Classics. Cambridge University Press. ISBN 978-0-521-64386-3.
- Ewans, Michael (2002). "Performance-based Research into Greek Drama". In Barsby, John (ed.). Greek and Roman Drama: Translation and Performance. Drama: Beträge zum antiken Drama und seiner Rezeption. Vol. 12. Stuttgart and Weimar: J. B. Metzler. pp. 58–78. ISBN 978-3-476-45302-0.
- Goldhill, Simon (2007). How to Stage Greek Tragedy Today. Chicago and London: University of Chicago Press. ISBN 0-226-30128-1.
- Gould, John (1978). "Dramatic Character and 'Human Intelligibility' in Greek Tragedy". Proceedings of the Cambridge Philosophical Society. 2nd. 24: 43–67. doi:10.1017/S006867350000403X.
- Hölscher, Uvo (1994). "Schrecken und Lachen: Über Ekkyklema-Szenen im attischen Drama" [Terror and Laughter: On Ekkyklema-Scenes in Attic Drama]. In Bierl, Anton; von Möllendorff, Peter (eds.). Orchestra: Drama, Mythos, Bühne [Orchestra: Drama, Myth, Stage] (in German). with Sabine Vogt. Wiesbaden: Springer. pp. 84–96. doi:10.1007/978-3-663-12276-0. ISBN 978-3-663-12277-7.
- Hughes, Alan (2012). Performing Greek Comedy. Cambridge University Press. doi:10.1017/CBO9780511920820. ISBN 978-0-511-92082-0.
- Jouanna, Jacques (2018) [2008]. Sophocles: A Study of His Theater in Its Political and Social Context. Translated by Rendall, Steven. Princeton University Press. ISBN 978-0-691-24040-4.
- Julius Pollux (1824). Dindorf, Wilhelm (ed.). Onomasticon. Leipzig: Kuehn. OCLC 875123450 – via Internet Archive.
- Ley, Graham (2007). The Theatricality of Greek Tragedy: Playing Space and Chorus. Chicago and London: University of Chicago Press. ISBN 0-226-47757-6.
- Naiden, Fred S. (2015). "The Sword Did It: A Greek Explanation for Suicide". The Classical Quarterly. 65 (1): 85–95. doi:10.1017/S0009838814000858.
- Nunquist, Rene (2019). The Ancient Critic at Work: Terms and Concepts of Literary Criticism in Greek Scholia. Cambridge University Press. doi:10.1017/CBO9780511575891. ISBN 978-0-511-57589-1.
- Perris, Simon (2021). "Violence in Adaptations of Greek Tragedy". In Liapis, Vayos; Sidiropoulou, Avra (eds.). Adapting Geek Tragedy: Contemporary Contexts for Ancient Texts. Cambridge University Press. pp. 247–271. doi:10.1017/9781316659168. ISBN 978-1-316-65916-8.
- Philippides, Katerina (2019). "Remarks on the Performance of Menander's Comedies in the Athenian Theater of Dionysus" (PDF). Logeion. 9: 301–309.
- Pietrobelli, Antione (2019). "Galen's Early Reception (Second–Third Centuries)". In Bouras-Vallianatos, Petros; Zipser, Barbara (eds.). Brill's Companion to the Reception of Galen. Brill's Companions to Classical Reception. Vol. 17. Leiden: Brill. pp. 11–37. ISBN 978-90-04-30221-1.
- Rehm, Rush (1992). Greek Tragic Theatre. Theatre Production Studies. London and New York: Routledge. ISBN 0-415-11894-8.
- Revermann, Martin (2006). Comic Business: Theatricality, Dramatic Technique, and Performance Contexts of Aristophanic Comedy. Oxford University Press. ISBN 0-19-815271-X.
- Scullion, Scott (1994). Three Studies in Athenian Dramaturgy. Beiträge zur Altertumskunde. Vol. 25. Stuttgart and Leipzig: B. G. Teubner. ISBN 3-519-07474-5.
- Sommerstein, Alan, ed. (2009). Aeschylus: Fragments. Loeb Classical Library. Vol. 505. Cambridge, Mass.: Harvard University Press. ISBN 978-0-674-99629-8.
- Storey, Ian C.; Allan, Arlene (2005). A Guide to Ancient Greek Drama. Malden, Mass., and Oxford: Blackwell. ISBN 1-4051-0215-2.
- Taplin, Oliver (1977). The Stagecraft of Aeschylus. Oxford University Press. ISBN 0-19-814006-1.
- Tomlinson, Richard Allan (1996). "Theatres (Greek and Roman), Structure". In Hornblower, Simon; Spawforth, Anthony (eds.). The Oxford Classical Dictionary (3rd ed.). Oxford University Press. p. 1495. ISBN 0-19-866172-X.
- von Wilamowitz-Moellendorff, Ulrich (1959) [1895]. Einleitung in die griechische Tragödie [Introduction to Greek Tragedy] (in German). Reprinted in Euripides: Herakles, Vol. 1 (2nd ed.). Darmstad: Wissenschaftliche Buchgesellschaft. OCLC 5665615.
- Wyles, Rosie (2020). Theatre Props and Civic Identity in Athens, 458–405 BC. London: Bloomsbury Academic. ISBN 978-1-3501-4397-5.
