= Parodos =

Ancient Greek theatre terminology

A parodos (also parode and parodus; Ancient Greek: πάροδος, 'entrance', plural parodoi), in the theater of ancient Greece, is a side-entrance to the stage, or the first song that is sung by the chorus at the beginning of a Greek tragedy.

== Side-entrance to the theater ==
The parodos is a large passageway affording access either to the stage (for actors/ singers) or to the orchestra (for the chorus) of the ancient Greek theater. The parodoi can be distinguished from the entrances to the stage from the skene, or stage building, as the two parodoi are long ramps located on either side of the stage, between the skene and the theatron, or audience seating area. The term eisodos ('way in') is also used. Scholars note that eisodos was an older term for the passageway while parodos was widely used by writers from Aristotle onwards.

== Entrance song of the chorus ==
Parodos also refers to the ode sung by the chorus as it enters and occupies its place in the orchestra. Aristotle defined it as "the first whole utterance of a chorus". Usually the first choral song of the drama, the parodos typically follows the play's prologue. It is an important part as it defines the chorus, provides information about the plot, and assists or fights the protagonist. In Greek comedy, the parodos is considered the climactic moment. The parodos is highly commemorated in Athenian artifacts that show choral performance.
