= Maera (hound) =

Mythical dog of Icarius of Attica

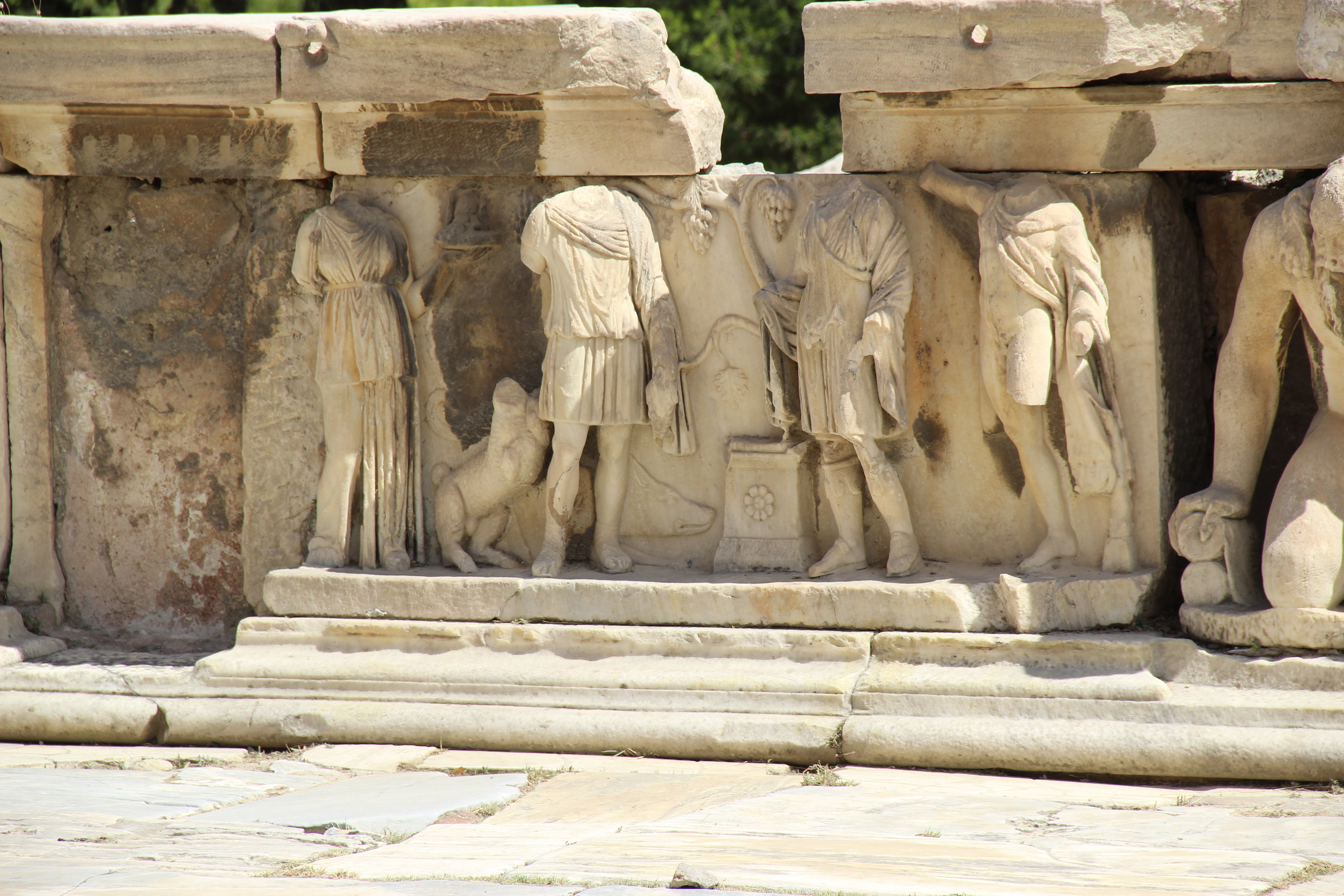
Maera with Erigone, Icarius and Dionysus on the Bema of Phaidros, 3rd century, Acropolis of Athens Greece.

In Greek mythology, Maera (Ancient Greek: Μαῖρα, romanized: Maîra, lit. 'sparkler') is the hound of Erigone, daughter of Icarius of Athens.

== Mythology ==
Icarius was a follower of the wine god Dionysus and had been taught how to make wine. While travelling, Icarius met some shepherds and gave them wine; they became intoxicated and believed Icarius had poisoned them, so they killed him. Erigone was worried about her father, and set off with Maera to find him. Maera led her to his grave, and both became so overwhelmed with grief that she hung herself and Maera leapt off a cliff. Upon hearing the news, Dionysus was angry and punished Athens with a plague, inflicting insanity on all the unmarried women, who all hung themselves, imitating Erigone. The plague did not cease until the Athenians introduced honorific rites for Icarius and Erigone. Zeus or Dionysus placed Icarius, Erigone and Maera in the sky as the constellations Virgo (Erigone) Boötes (Icarius), and the star Procyon (Maera).
