= Peter Arnott =

British author, puppeteer and professor of drama (1931–1990)

Peter D. Arnott (1931–1990) was a puppeteer and Professor of drama at Tufts University. He wrote many books and translated many classical plays.

== Early life ==
Arnott was born in Ipswich, England in 1931 where he earned bachelor's degrees from both the University of Wales and Oxford University. He earned a PhD in drama from the University of Wales before moving to the United States where he taught drama at the University of Iowa. In 1969, Arnott was hired by Tufts University where he was their youngest professor.

Arnott's degrees from the University of Wales and from Oxford University were in Classics. He joined the Classics department of the University of Iowa in 1958. He taught courses in Greek drama, western civilization and theater history until he moved to Tufts University's Drama department in 1969.

He had a wife and three children.

== Incomplete bibliography ==
- Plays without people: puppetry and serious drama (1964)
- The Oresteia: Agamemnon, Libation Bearers and Eumenides, English translation (1964)
- An introduction to the Greek Theater (1967)
- An Introduction to the Roman World (1970)
- The ancient Greek and Roman theatre (1971)
- The Byzantines and Their World (1973)
- The Theater in Its Time (1981)
- Public and Performance in the Greek Theatre (1989)
