= Icarius (Athenian) =

Mythical introducer of wine

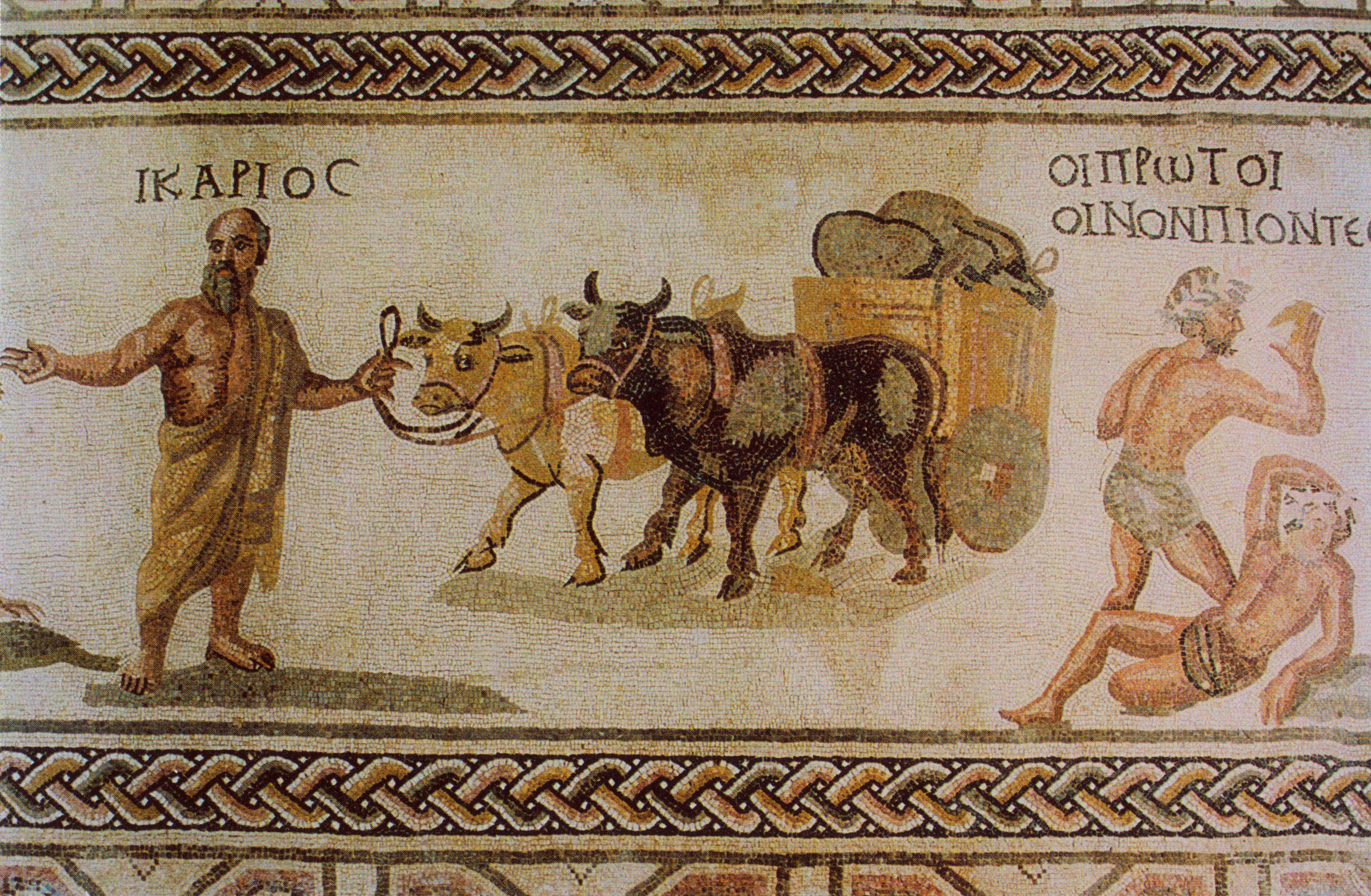
Icarius transporting wine in a 3rd-century mosaic from Paphos

In Greek mythology, Icarius (/ɪˈkɛəriəs/; Ancient Greek: Ἰκάριος Ikários) was a man from Athens who welcomed the god Dionysus.

== Mythology ==
Icarius was cordial towards Dionysus, who gave his shepherds wine. The shepherds became intoxicated and killed Icarius, thinking he had poisoned them. His daughter Erigone and her dog Maera found his body. Erigone hanged herself over her father's grave. Dionysus was angry and punished Athens with a plague, inflicting insanity on all the unmarried women, who all hanged themselves as Erigone had. The plague did not cease until the Athenians introduced honorific rites for Icarius and Erigone. Icarius was placed in the stars as the constellation Boötes by Dionysus or Zeus who pitied their misfortune. A mosaic in a mid-2nd century AD Roman villa in Nea Paphos, capital of Roman Cyprus, depicts Dionysus giving the gift of vine and wine to Icarius as a reward for Icarius' generous hospitality. The villa, dubbed the "House of Dionysus" by its excavators, is in the Paphos World Heritage Site and managed by the Paphos Archaeological Park. It was probably this Icarius whom Clement of Alexandria referred to as husband of Phanothea, a woman who was believed to have invented the hexameter.
