= Mechane =

Type of machine used in Ancient Greek theatre

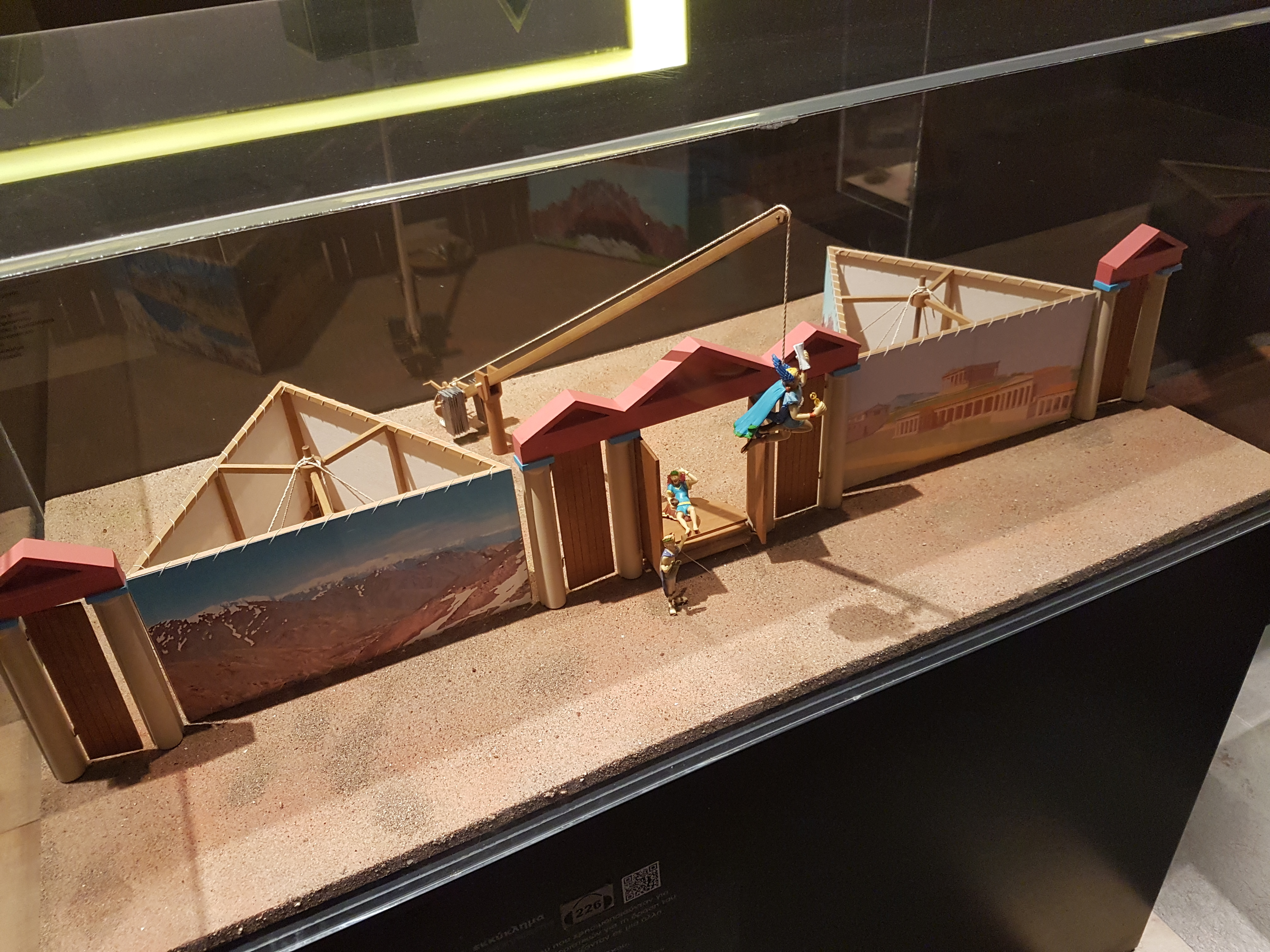
5th century BCE (model)

A mechane (/ˈmɛkəniː/; Ancient Greek: μηχανή, romanized: mēkhanḗ) or machine was a crane used in Greek theatre, especially in the 5th and 4th centuries BC. Made of wooden beams and pulley systems, the device was used to lift an actor into the air, usually representing flight. This stage machine was particularly used to bring gods onto the stage from above, hence the Latin term deus ex machina ("god from the machine"). Euripides' use of the mechane in Medea (431 BCE) is a notable use of the machine for a non-divine character. It was also often used by Aeschylus.

== Use in ancient Rome ==
Stage machines were also used in ancient Rome, e.g. during the sometimes highly dramatic performances at funerals. For Julius Caesar's funeral service, Appian reports a mechane that was used to present a blood-stained wax effigy of the deceased dictator to the funeral crowd. The mechane was used to turn the body in all directions. Geoffrey Sumi proposes that the use of the mechane "hinted at Caesar's divinity". This is highly unlikely because Appian doesn't describe the mechane as a genuine deus-ex-machina device. Furthermore Caesar's apotheosis wasn't legally conducted until 42 BCE and Caesar had only been worshipped unofficially as divus during his lifetime. First and foremost, Marcus Antonius attempted to arouse the masses as a means to strengthen Caesar's esteem as well as his own political power.

== Religious significance ==
In Christian liturgy the mechane has also been identified with the cross. Ignatius calls the cross the "theatre mechane" of Jesus Christ.

== See also ==
- Divus Julius
