= HD 61563 =

Binary star in the constellation of Canis Minor

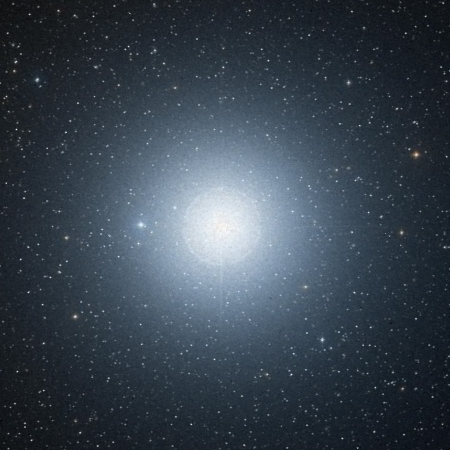
- HD 61563 is the brightest star to the left (east) of Procyon in this image.

Observation data Epoch J2000.0 Equinox ICRS
- Constellation: Canis Minor
- A
- Right ascension: +07^{h} 40^{m} 06.9950^{s}
- Declination: +05° 13′ 52.243″
- Apparent magnitude (V): 6.33
- B
- Right ascension: +07^{h} 40^{m} 07.0011^{s}
- Declination: +05° 13′ 51.355″
- Apparent magnitude (V): 6.96

Characteristics
- Spectral type: A0IV + A0IV

Astrometry

A
Radial velocity (R_{v})	17 km/s
Proper motion (μ)	RA: −2.026 mas/yr Dec.: −18.518 mas/yr
Parallax (π)	4.8912±0.1480 mas
Distance	670 ± 20 ly (204 ± 6 pc)

B
Proper motion (μ)	RA: −3.162 mas/yr Dec.: −16.548 mas/yr
Parallax (π)	2.3276±0.3673 mas
Distance	approx. 1,400 ly (approx. 430 pc)

Orbit
Period (P)	1,516 yr
Semi-major axis (a)	2.792″
Eccentricity (e)	0.917
Inclination (i)	67.3°

Details

A
Radius	5.9 R_{☉}
Luminosity	72 L_{☉}
Temperature	10,100 K

B
Mass	2.4 M_{☉}
Radius	2.4 R_{☉}
Luminosity	41 L_{☉}
Surface gravity (log g)	4.08 cgs
Temperature	9,517 K

Other designations
- BD+05°1742, HD 61563, HR 2950, SAO 115773, WDS J07401+0514

Database references
SIMBAD	data
- A
- B

HD 61563 is a binary star in the constellation of Canis Minor consisting of two A-type stars with both spectral types A0IV, and the combined apparent magnitude is 6.02, barely visible to the naked eye.
